= Isaiah 52 =

Book of Isaiah, chapter 52

- ← chapter 51 chapter 53 →
- The Great Isaiah Scroll, the best preserved of the biblical scrolls found at Qumran from the second century BC, contains all the verses in this chapter.
- Book: Book of Isaiah
- Hebrew Bible part: Nevi'im
- Order in the Hebrew part: 5
- Category: Latter Prophets
- Christian Bible part: Old Testament
- Order in the Christian part: 23

Isaiah 52 is the fifty-second chapter of the Book of Isaiah in the Hebrew Bible or the Old Testament of the Christian Bible. This book contains the prophecies attributed to the prophet Isaiah, and is one of the Books of the Prophets. Chapters 40-55 are known as "Deutero-Isaiah" and date from the time of the Israelites' exile in Babylon. This chapter includes from verse 13 the start of the fourth of the songs of the "Suffering Servant".

== Text ==
The original text was written in Hebrew language. This chapter is divided into 15 verses.

=== Textual witnesses ===
Some early manuscripts containing the text of this chapter in Hebrew are found among the Dead Sea Scrolls, i.e., the Isaiah Scroll (1Qlsa^{a}; 356-100 BCE), and of the Masoretic Text tradition, which includes Codex Cairensis (895 CE), the Petersburg Codex of the Prophets (916), Aleppo Codex (10th century), Codex Leningradensis (1008).

There is also a translation into Koine Greek known as the Septuagint, made in the last few centuries BCE. Extant ancient manuscripts of the Septuagint version include Codex Vaticanus (B; $\mathfrak{G}$^{B}; 4th century), Codex Sinaiticus (S; BHK: $\mathfrak{G}$^{S}; 4th century), Codex Alexandrinus (A; $\mathfrak{G}$^{A}; 5th century) and Codex Marchalianus (Q; $\mathfrak{G}$^{Q}; 6th century).

== Parashot ==
The parashah sections listed here are based on the Aleppo Codex. Isaiah 52 is a part of the Consolations (Isaiah 40–66). {P}: open parashah; {S}: closed parashah.

{P} 52:1-2 {S} 52:3 {S} 52:4-6 {S} 52:7-10 {S} 52:11-12 {S} 52:13-15 {S}

== Structure ==
The New King James Version organises this chapter as follows:

- Isaiah 52:1–12 = God Redeems Jerusalem
- Isaiah 52:13–12 = The Sin-Bearing Servant (continuing into Isaiah 53:1–12 as the Sin-Bearing Messiah).

== Deliverance for Jerusalem (52:1–12) ==
=== Verse 1 ===
Awake, awake!
Put on your strength, O Zion;
Put on your beautiful garments,

O Jerusalem, the holy city!

For the uncircumcised and the unclean

Shall no longer come to you.

The call, Awake, awake (Hebrew: עורי עורי ‘ūrî ‘ūrî) repeats the same call heard in Isaiah 51:9 and Isaiah 51:17.

=== Verse 7 ===
How beautiful upon the mountains

are the feet of him who brings good news,

who proclaims peace,

who brings good news of happiness,
who proclaims salvation,

who says to Zion,

"Your God reigns!"

- "Reigns": or "has become king"; a shout which is usually voiced When a new king was enthroned. This enthronement formula (Qal perfect third person masculine singular מָלַךְ [malakh], followed by the name of the king) is used in 2 Samuel 15:10; 1 Kings 1:11, 13, 18; 2 Kings 9:13.
- Cited in Romans 10:15.

== The Servant exalted (52:13–15) ==
=== Verse 15 ===
So shall he sprinkle many nations; the kings shall shut their mouths at him:
for that which had not been told them shall they see; and that which they had not heard shall they consider.

- "Sprinkle": translated from the Hebrew verb (a Hiphil stem) יַזֶּה, yazzeh, which has been understood as a causative of נָזָה, nazah, "spurt, spatter"; in this case the servant as a priest who "sprinkles" (or "spiritually cleanses") the nations.

The second line is rendered in the Greek Septuagint version as: "For those who were not told will see, and those who have not heard will understand", which is cited in Romans 15:21.

== Israel ==
Citing a number of Biblical verses that refer to Israel as the "servant", many of them from the Book of Isaiah such as 49:3 He said to me, "You are My servant, Israel, in whom I will display My splendor." Jewish scholars, and several Christian scholarly books, like Revised Standard Version Oxford Study Edition Bible, The Revised Standard Version tell us that Isaiah 53 is about national Israel and the New English Bible echo this analysis. Judaism, teaches that the "servant" in question is actually the nation of Israel. These scholars also argue that verse 10 cannot be describing Jesus. The verse states:

^{10}he shall see [his] seed, he shall prolong [his] days

Taken literally, this description, is inconsistent with the short, childless life of Jesus. But there is interpretive room to argue that a resurrected Jesus has prolonged his days indefinitely and that his "seed" are those who become Christians.

The reason that the Servant is referred to in the third person may be that these verses are written from the point of view of Gentile nations amazed at Israel's restoration, or it may simply be a method of figurative description. Supporters of this theory argue that the reason for the use of past tense is based on the differences between Proto-Isaiah and Deutero-Isaiah. Chapters 40–55 of Isaiah are referred to as "Deutero-Isaiah" because the themes and language are different from the rest of the book, leading some scholars to believe it was written by another author. Deutero-Isaiah differs from Proto-Isaiah in that it refers to Israel as already restored, which could account for the past-tense of the passage.

The Servant passages in Isaiah, and especially Isaiah 53, may be compared with Psalm 44. Psalm 44 directly parallels the Servant Songs, making it, probably, the best defense for reading Isaiah 53 as applicable to the nation of Israel.

== Jewish–Christian relations ==
=== Before 1000 ===
The earliest known example of a Jew and a Christian debating the meaning of Isaiah 53 is the example from 248 cited by Origen. In Christian church father Origen's Contra Celsus, written in 248, he writes of Isaiah 53:

Now I remember that, on one occasion, at a disputation held with certain Jews, who were reckoned wise men, I quoted these prophecies; to which my Jewish opponent replied, that these predictions bore reference to the whole people, regarded as one individual, and as being in a state of dispersion and suffering, in order that many proselytes might be gained, on account of the dispersion of the Jews among numerous heathen nations.

The discourse between Origen and his Jewish counterpart does not seem to have had any consequences for either party. This was not the case for the majority of centuries that have passed since that time. In Ecclesiastes Rabbah 1:24, written in the 700s, a debate about a much less controversial topic results in the arrest of the Jew engaging in the debate.

=== 1000–1500 ===
In 1263 at the Disputation of Barcelona, Nahmanides expressed the Jewish viewpoint of Isaiah 53 and other matters regarding Christian belief about Jesus's role in Hebrew Scripture. The disputation was awarded in his favor by James I of Aragon, and as a result the Dominican Order compelled him to flee from Spain for the remainder of his life. Passages of Talmud were also censored. In a number of other disputations, debate about this passage resulted in forced conversions, deportations, and the burning of Jewish religious texts.

=== Modern era ===
The use of Isaiah 53 in debates between Jews and Christians still often occurs in the context of Christian missionary work among Jews, and the topic is a source of frequent discussion that is often repetitive and heated. Some devout Christians view the use of the Christian interpretation of Isaiah 53 in targeted conversion of Jews as a special act of Christian love and a fulfillment of Jesus Christ's teaching of the Great Commission.

== Uses ==
=== Music ===
The King James Version of verse 7 from this chapter is cited as texts in the English-language oratorio "Messiah" by George Frideric Handel (HWV 56).

== See also ==
- Arrest of Jesus
- Burial of Jesus
- Old Testament messianic prophecies quoted in the New Testament
- Christianity and Judaism
- Crucifixion of Jesus
- Holy Week
- Messiah in Judaism
- New Covenant, Supersessionism
- Resurrection of Jesus
- Trial of Jesus
- Related Bible parts: Isaiah 42, Isaiah 49, Isaiah 50, Isaiah 53, Matthew 8, Matthew 27, Mark 14, Luke 23, Luke 24, John 19, Romans 10, Philippians 2

== Bibliography ==
- Würthwein, Ernst (1995). The Text of the Old Testament. Translated by Rhodes, Erroll F. Grand Rapids, MI: Wm. B. Eerdmans. ISBN 0-8028-0788-7.
