= Isaiah 50 =

Book of Isaiah, chapter 50

- ← chapter 49 chapter 51 →
- The Great Isaiah Scroll, the best preserved of the biblical scrolls found at Qumran from the second century BC, contains all the verses in this chapter.
- Book: Book of Isaiah
- Hebrew Bible part: Nevi'im
- Order in the Hebrew part: 5
- Category: Latter Prophets
- Christian Bible part: Old Testament
- Order in the Christian part: 23

Isaiah 50 is the fiftieth chapter of the Book of Isaiah in the Hebrew Bible or the Old Testament of the Christian Bible. This book contains the prophecies attributed to the prophet Isaiah, and is one of the Books of the Prophets. Chapters 40-55 are known as "Deutero-Isaiah" and date from the time of the Israelites' exile in Babylon. This chapter includes the third of the songs of the "Suffering Servant".

== Text ==
The original text was written in Hebrew language. This chapter is divided into 11 verses.

=== Textual witnesses ===
Some early manuscripts containing the text of this chapter in Hebrew are of the Masoretic Text tradition, which includes the Codex Cairensis (895), the Petersburg Codex of the Prophets (916), Aleppo Codex (10th century), Codex Leningradensis (1008).

Fragments containing parts of this chapter were found among the Dead Sea Scrolls (3rd century BC or later):

- 1QIsa^{a} (2nd century BCE): all verses
- 1QIsa^{b} (1st century BCE): extant: verses 8–11
- 4QIsa^{c} (4Q57): extant verses 7–11

There is also a translation into Koine Greek known as the Septuagint, made in the last few centuries BCE. Extant ancient manuscripts of the Septuagint version include Codex Vaticanus (B; $\mathfrak{G}$^{B}; 4th century), Codex Sinaiticus (S; BHK: $\mathfrak{G}$^{S}; 4th century), Codex Alexandrinus (A; $\mathfrak{G}$^{A}; 5th century), and Codex Marchalianus (Q; $\mathfrak{G}$^{Q}; 6th century).

== Parashot ==
The parashah sections listed here are based on the Aleppo Codex. Isaiah 50 is a part of the Consolations (Isaiah 40–66). {P}: open parashah; {S}: closed parashah.

{S} 50:1-3 {P} 50:4-9 {S} 50:10 {S} 50:11 {S}

== Verse 3 ==
I clothe the heavens with blackness, and I make sackcloth their covering.

Similarly in Revelation 6:12:

The sun became black as sackcloth of hair.

== Third servant song ==
The servant songs were first identified by Bernhard Duhm in his 1892 Commentary on Isaiah. The songs are four poems taken from the Book of Isaiah written about a certain "servant of YHWH". God calls the servant to lead the nations, but the servant is horribly repressed. In the end, he is rewarded. Those four poems are:

1. Isaiah 42:1–9
2. Isaiah 49:1–12
3. Isaiah 50:4–9
4. Isaiah 52–53

The third of the "servant songs" begins at Isaiah 50:4, continuing through 50:11. The Jerusalem Bible divides it into two sections:

- Isaiah 50:4-9: The servant speaks
- Isaiah 50:10-11: Exhortation to follow the servant.

This song has a darker yet more confident tone than the others. Although the song gives a first-person description of how the Servant was beaten and abused, here the Servant is described both as teacher and learner who follows the path God places him on without pulling back. Echoing the words of the first song, "a bruised reed he will not break", he sustains the weary with a word. His vindication is left in God's hands.

Almost all commentators agree that the language here is individual in nature. Maintaining the collective interpretation of the Servant became more difficult with the detailed allusions to rejection, physical abuse, disfigurement, and eventually death, in 50:4–9 and 52:13–53:12.

== Uses ==
=== Music ===
The King James Version of verse 6 from this chapter is cited as texts in the English-language oratorio "Messiah" by George Frideric Handel (HWV 56).

== See also ==
- Old Testament messianic prophecies quoted in the New Testament
- Christianity and Judaism
- Crucifixion of Jesus
- Holy Week
- Messiah in Judaism
- New Covenant, Supersessionism
- Related Bible parts: Isaiah 42, Isaiah 49, Isaiah 52, Isaiah 53, Matthew 26

== Bibliography ==
- Würthwein, Ernst (1995). The Text of the Old Testament. Translated by Rhodes, Erroll F. Grand Rapids, MI: Wm. B. Eerdmans. ISBN 0-8028-0788-7.
