= Isaiah 53 =

53rd chapter of the Book of Isaiah in the Hebrew Bible

- ← chapter 52 chapter 54 →
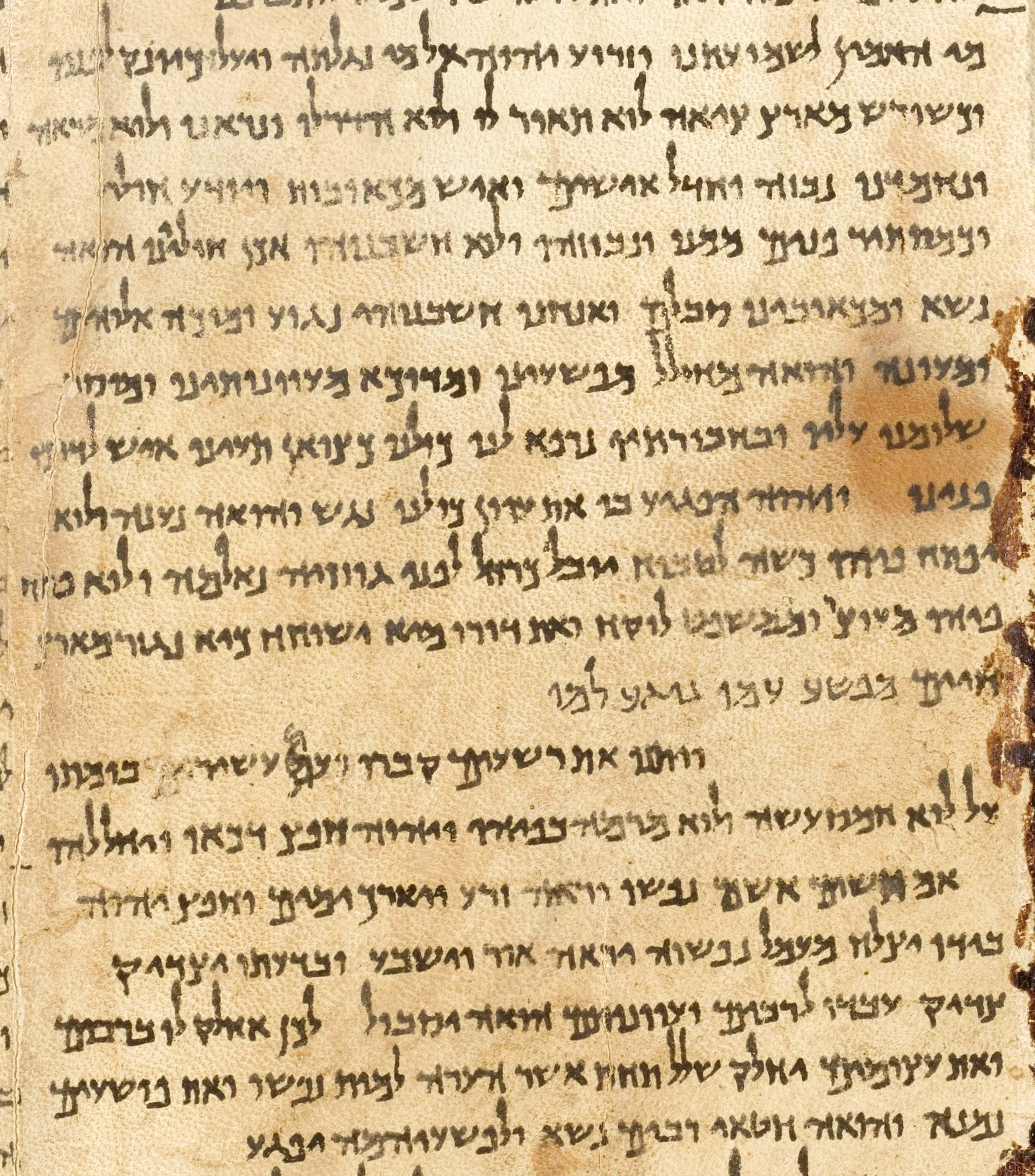
- Isaiah 53 in the Great Isaiah Scroll, the best preserved of the biblical scrolls found at Qumran from the second century BC (and mostly identical to the Masoretic version)
- Book: Book of Isaiah
- Hebrew Bible part: Nevi'im
- Order in the Hebrew part: 5
- Category: Latter Prophets
- Christian Bible part: Old Testament
- Order in the Christian part: 23

Isaiah 53 is the fifty-third chapter of the Book of Isaiah in the Hebrew Bible or the Old Testament of the Christian Bible. It contains the prophecies attributed to the prophet Isaiah and is one of the Nevi'im. Chapters 40 to 55 are known as "Deutero-Isaiah" and date from the time of the Israelites' exile in Babylon.

== The Fourth Servant Song: Isaiah 52:13 to 53:12 ==
Yet it was our sickness that he was bearing, Our suffering that he endured. We accounted him plagued, Smitten and afflicted by God; But he was wounded because of our sins, Crushed because of our iniquities. He bore the chastisement that made us whole, And by his bruises we were healed. We all went astray like sheep, Each going his own way; And the LORD visited upon him The guilt of all of us.”

– Isaiah 53:4–6, New Jewish Publication Society Translation

Isaiah 52:13–53:12 makes up the fourth of the "Servant Songs" of the Book of Isaiah, describing a "servant" of God who is abused and looked down upon but eventually vindicated.

== Text ==
The original text was written in Biblical Hebrew. This chapter is divided into 12 verses, although the pericope begins in Isaiah 52:13. The pericope thus encompasses 15 verses. The passage survives in a number of independent and parallel manuscript traditions in Hebrew, Greek, Latin, and others.

Hebrew
The standard Hebrew edition that serves as the basis for most modern translations is Codex Leningradensis (1008). Other manuscripts of the Masoretic Text tradition include Codex Cairensis (895), the Petersburg Codex of the Prophets (916), and the Aleppo Codex (10th century).

Fragments containing all or parts of this chapter were found among the Dead Sea Scrolls. These are the earliest extant witnesses to the Hebrew text of the chapter:

- 1QIsa^{a} (2nd century BCE.): all verses
- 1QIsa^{b} (1st century BCE): all verses
- 4QIsa^{b} (4Q56): extant verses 11–12
- 4QIsa^{c} (4Q57): extant verses 1–3, 6–8
- 4QIsa^{d} (4Q58): extant verses 8–12

Greek
The translation into Koine Greek, known as the Septuagint, was made in the last few centuries BCE. Extant ancient manuscripts of the Septuagint version include Codex Vaticanus (B; $\mathfrak{G}$^{B}; 4th century), Codex Sinaiticus (S; BHK: $\mathfrak{G}$^{S}; 4th century), Codex Alexandrinus (A; $\mathfrak{G}$^{A}; 5th century) and Codex Marchalianus (Q; $\mathfrak{G}$^{Q}; 6th century). Several passages of the text were included in the New Testament (see New Testament below) and serve as further witnesses to the Greek text in the first century. Origen's Hexapla preserved assorted Greek translations of the text from Aquila, Theodotion, and Symmachus, dating to the second century CE.
Latin
Jerome translated his Vulgate from Hebrew manuscripts that were available to him in the 4th century CE. Retroversion of the Latin into Hebrew may recover what his Hebrew manuscripts said at the time.
Other Languages
Versions of Isaiah 53 exist in many other languages, but they are of limited use for establishing the critical text. The Aramaic Targum Isaiah is often paraphrasing and loose with its translation. Many other early translations (i.e. Ethiopic, Slavonic, etc.), produced by Christians, were dependent upon the Septuagint and are of limited use for recovering the Hebrew.

== Parashot ==
The parashah sections listed here are based on the Aleppo Codex. Isaiah 53 is a part of the Consolations (Isaiah 40–66).

== Interpretive options concerning the servant's identity ==
The central interpretive question to be answered for the passage concerns Isaiah's intended referent for the servant. Related questions include the Isaiah 53 servant's relationship with the servant(s) mentioned in the other songs. Three major classes of interpretation have been proposed for the servant of Isaiah 53:

Individual
The individual interpretation states that the intended referent for the servant is a single Israelite man. The passage's third-person masculine singular nouns and verbs are cited as evidence for this position. Sometimes, the entire pericope is interpreted concerning an individual, and in other cases, only selected verses are so interpreted. Several individual referents have been proposed:

- Jesus Christ (Christianity only; Luke 22:37, Acts 8:32-35, 1 Peter 2:21-22)
- Rabbi Akiva (Jerusalem Talmud Shekalim 5:1)
- Moses (Sotah 14a) Nachmanides
- The Jewish Messiah (Targum Jonathan, Sanhedrin 98a–b, Ruth Rabbah 5:6, Midrash Tanhuma Toldot 14, Yalkut Shimoni 476, Midrash Tehillim 2:7, and Maimonides in Iggeret Teiman 13)
- Jeremiah (Saadia Gaon)

A Righteous Israelite Remnant
Some interpretations state that the servant is representative of any Israelites who meet a particular standard of righteousness, such that the passage applies to some Israelites and not others. Examples include:

- Whoever the Lord is pleased with, he crushes with suffering (Berakhot 5a)
- One who is sick and has a seminal emission (Berakhot 57b)

National
This interpretation states that the servant is a metaphor for the entire nation of Israel, as indicated by prior verses in Deutero-Isaiah (Isaiah 41:8-9, 44:1, 44:21, 49:3). The servant's sufferings are seen as the sufferings of the nation as a whole while in exile. This interpretation first appears with unnamed Jews familiar to Origen in the third century CE (see below), and it subsequently became the majority position within Judaism from the medieval period until today. Sometimes, this view is combined with the "righteous remnant" view (e.g., Rashi on 53:3 and 53:8) Representative commentaries include:

- Rashi
- Ibn Ezra
- Radak

== History of interpretation ==
Hardly any passage of the Hebrew Bible is and has been of such fundamental importance in the history of Jewish–Christian debate, or has played such a central role in it, as has the fourth Servant Song of Second Isaiah. Nor has any other passage experienced such different and sometimes mutually exclusive interpretations as this one.

– Stefan Schreiner, The Suffering Servant

A wide variety of sources across many centuries include interpretations of the chapter. This section will highlight some of the key interpretive sources organized by date of textual origin.

=== Dead Sea Scrolls (3rd century BCE – 1st century CE) ===
The Dead Sea Scrolls include both biblical and non-biblical scrolls that reflect the text and the themes of Isaiah 53.

==== 1QIsa^{a}, the Great Isaiah Scroll ====
In their article on the interpretation of Isaiah 53 in the pre-Christian period, Martin Hengel and Daniel P. Bailey noted a possible messianic reading in the Great Isaiah Scroll for Isaiah 52:14. They wrote,

The first line agrees with the Masoretic Text (MT, though the MT's עָלֶיךָ is here spelled with the final ה mater) and may be translated as "Just as many were astonished at you.": But in the second line, instead of the MT's unclear hapax legomenon מִשְׁחַת or מַשְׁחֵת, “marring,” “disfigurement,” 1QIsa^{a} suffixes a yod to read the qal perfect first singular מָשַׁחְתִּי, "I have anointed." To the last word: אָדָם, 1QIsa^{a} furthermore adds the article: "the human." We may therefore translate:

Just as many were astonished at you, so have I anointed his appearance beyond that of any (other) man, and his form beyond that of the sons of humanity [lit., of the human].

Because this reading indicates God anointed the servant "beyond that of any (other) man," it is likely that the scribe who penned the Great Isaiah Scroll interpreted the servant as a messianic figure.

Another variant is present in two Qumran manuscripts and the LXX. Martin and Hengel write, "The most important variant that Scrolls A and B have in common (see also 4QIsa^{d}) is the phrase יראה אור ('he will see light') in 53:11, attested also in the LXX."

It is likely that the Qumran community saw Isaiah 52:7 as the beginning of the pericope, and 52:13 starting a subsection within it. Second Temple Judaism scholar Craig Evans notes that 1QIsa^{a} includes a siglum in the margin at 52:7, just as it does in other major breaks of thought. Evans writes, "Although of uncertain meaning, this manuscript feature likely indicates the beginning of a new section." He notes that the Masoretic Text includes a samek (for seder) at the same verse, and a small samek after 52:12. Evans writes, "Accordingly, both the Great Isaiah Scroll of Qumran and the MT appear to view Isaiah 52:7–12 and 52:13–53:12 as two related units, perhaps with 52:7–12 introducing the hymn."

==== 4Q541 Fragment 9 ====
A portion of 4Q541 includes themes about an individual that will atone for his generation, despite his generation being evil and opposing him. Hengel and Bailey reviewed this fragment and others, noting, "As early as 1963, Starcky suspected that these portions of 4Q540 and 541... 'seem to evoke a suffering Messiah in the perspective opened up by the Servant Songs.'" The text of 4Q541 Fragment 9 reads,

2 And he will atone for all the children of his generation, and he will be sent to all the children of
3 his [people]. His word is like the word of the heavens, and his teaching, according to the will of God. His eternal sun will shine
4 and its fire will burn in all the ends of the earth; above the darkness it will shine. Then, darkness will vanish
5 [fr]om the earth, and gloom from the dry land. They will utter many words against him, and an abundance of
6 [lie]s; they will fabricate fables against him, and utter every kind of disparagement against him. His generation will be evil and changed

7 [and …] will be, and its position of deceit and of violence. [And] the people will go astray in his days and they will be bewildered.

==== 11Q13 (11QMelch) ====
11Q13, also 11QMelch or the Melchizedek document, is a fragmentary manuscript among the Dead Sea Scrolls (from Cave 11) which mentions Melchizedek as the leader of God's angels in a war in Heaven against the angels of darkness instead of the more familiar Archangel Michael. The text is an apocalyptic commentary on the Jubilee year of Leviticus 25. The passage includes a quotation of Isaiah 52:7 and a messianic explanation that ties the passage with Daniel 9:25. The scroll reads,

13 But, Melchizedek will carry out the vengeance of Go[d's] judgments, [and on that day he will fr]e[e them from the hand of] Belial and from the hand of all the sp[irits of his lot.]
14 To his aid (shall come) all «the gods of [justice»; and h]e is the one w[ho …] all the sons of God, and … […]
15 This […] is the day of [peace about whi]ch he said [… through Isa]iah the prophet, who said: [Isa 52:7 «How] beautiful
16 upon the mountains are the feet [of] the messen[ger who] announces peace, the mess[enger of good who announces salvati]on, [sa]ying to Zion: your God [reigns.»]
17 Its interpretation: The mountains [are] the prophet[s …] … […] for all … […]
18 And the messenger i[s] the anointed of the spir[it] as Dan[iel] said [about him: Dan 9:25 «Until an anointed, a prince, it is seven weeks.» And the messenger of]

19 good who announ[ces salvation] is the one about whom it is written that...

=== Septuagint (2nd century BCE) ===
The Septuagint (LXX) translation of Isaiah 53, dated to roughly 140 BCE, is a relatively free translation with a complicated relationship with the MT. Emanuel Tov has provided LXX/MT word equivalences for the passage, and verse-by-verse commentaries on the LXX of Isaiah 53 are provided by Jobes and Silva, and Hengel and Bailey.

In the LXX, the verbal aspect and subject of many verbs differ from the MT. In 53:8, the child/servant is "led to death," with the translator seeing lamavet (לַמָּוֶת) rather than lamo (לָֽמֹו). Verses 10–12 shift the narrative toward the "we" in the audience, beseeching the reader to perform a sin offering in order to "cleanse" and "justify" the righteous servant/child who was an innocent sufferer. Hengel and Bailey comment, "Therefore in the MT of verse 10, the Servant himself gives his life as an אָשָׁם or 'guilt offering' (NASB; NIV; cf. NJPS), that is, an atoning sacrifice. By contrast, the Greek conditional sentence ἐὰν δῶτε περὶ ἁμαρτίας in verse 10b requires a 'sin offering' from the members of the congregation who previously went astray and who were guilty in relationship to the Servant, in order that they might receive their share of the salvation promised to the Servant." Despite these differences with the MT, the "vicarious suffering" theme of the MT remains intact, as evidenced by the LXX of verses 4–6:

This one carries our sins and suffers pain for us, and we regarded him as one who is in difficulty, misfortune, and affliction. But he was wounded because of our sins, and he became sick because of our lawless acts. The discipline of our peace was upon him; by his bruise we were healed. We all have been misled like sheep; each person was misled in his own path, and the Lord handed him over for our sins. Isaiah 53:4–6, Lexham English Septuagint

While the theme of vicarious suffering is strong in the LXX, the translation avoids saying that the servant actually dies. In verse 4, the MT's imagery that could imply death (מֻכֵּה) is lessened to "misfortune/blow" (πληγῇ). Jobes and Silva also note, "This rendering is only one of several examples where the translator clearly avoids statements that attribute the servant's sufferings to God's action." In verse 8, the servant is "led to death," but in verse 9, God saves the servant before his execution by "giving" the wicked and the wealthy unto death instead of the servant. Hengel notes that the tendency to downplay the idea of vicarious suffering continued in Theodotion's Greek translation:

Jewish interpretation sharpens the tendency toward a statement of judgment at the end of the song and can completely suppress the idea of vicarious suffering. This is shown by Theodotion in the last phrase of 53:12. Against the Septuagint's expression of vicariousness, in which the Servant “was delivered up on account of their sins” (see below) (καὶ διὰ τὰς ἁμαρτίας αὐτῶν παρεδόθη), Theodotion reads et impios torquebit, “and he will torture the impious.” The Septuagint is still a long way from this complete reversal of the thought. The Servant receives his authority to act as judge precisely “because he did not do wrong, nor was deceit found in his mouth” (ὅτι ἀνομίαν οὐκ ἐποίησεν οὐδὲ εὑρέθη δόλος ἐν τῷ στόματι αὐτοῦ, v. 9). The motif of the innocent and righteous sufferer is therefore even clearer in the Septuagint than in the MT.

Unlike with 1QIsa^{a}, the identity of the Servant in Isaiah 53 LXX is unclear. F. Hahn concluded without elaboration, "A messianic interpretation cannot be recognized even in the Septuagint version of Isaiah 53." Hengel disagrees:

But who is this “righteous one” in the eyes of the translator? A one-sided collective interpretation referring to Israel seems to me hardly possible. Israel must be identified rather with the confession of the “we” group, which can hardly refer to the Gentile nations, since the Gentiles have no “report” to proclaim, as in 53:1 (ἀκοὴ ἡμῶν). Nor are the Gentiles healed by his “wounds” or “bruises” (53:5: μώλωψ); this can only apply to the people of God. The Servant will rather judge the kings and the nations, the wicked and the rich (Isa. 52:15; 53:9, 12). “The many” in 53:11–12 are the same as the “we” who make their confession in the first person plural in verses 1–7. They represent the doubting, straying Israel, for which the Servant has sacrificed himself. If the people of Israel repent, acknowledging and confessing their sins—which is perhaps their spiritual “sin offering” (cf. ἐὰν δῶτε περὶ ἁμαρτίας, 53:10)—then on the basis of the Servant's vicarious atoning suffering, they may share his exalted destiny.... At least the possibility of a messianic interpretation must be kept open, though as the Qumran texts now show, in the second century B.C.E. the concept of what was “messianic” was not yet as clearly fixed on the eschatological saving king from the house of David as it was later to become in the post-Christian rabbinic tradition. We must not allow the narrow concept of the Messiah in the post-Christian rabbis to regulate the diverse pre-Christian messianic ideas.

=== New Testament (1st century CE) ===
"For even the Son of Man came not to be served but to serve, and to give his life as a ransom for many." – Jesus of Nazareth, Mark 10:45 (ESV)

The New Testament portrays a consistent and singular interpretation of Isaiah 53 by identifying the suffering servant as Jesus. His experiences of crucifixion and resurrection are portrayed as the fulfillment of the text.

New Testament Quotations of Isaiah 53
Isaiah Passage	New Testament Quotation	Referent
Isaiah 52:13	John 3:14, John 8:28	Jesus as the man "lifted up"
Isaiah 52:15	Romans 15:21	Evangelists, like Paul, who spread the servant's message to Gentiles
Isaiah 53:1	Romans 10:16, John 12:38	The unbelief of Israel regarding the servant
Isaiah 53:4	Matthew 8:17	Jesus, the miraculous healer, taking Israel's diseases
Isaiah 53:5	1 Peter 2:24	Jesus as the wounded one who heals others
Isaiah 53:6	1 Peter 2:25	Humanity straying like sheep and brought back through Jesus
Isaiah 53:7–8	Acts 8:32–33	Jesus
Isaiah 53:9	1 Peter 2:22	Jesus, who committed no sin
Isaiah 53:12	Luke 22:37	Jesus, numbered with the transgressors

Besides these direct quotations, there are many more allusions to Isaiah 53 throughout the New Testament.

==== Gospels and Acts ====
The first recorded words of Jesus in the Gospel of Mark, believed by many to be the earliest gospel, are the following: "The time is fulfilled, and the kingdom of God is at hand; repent and believe in the gospel (euangelion, εὐαγγέλιον)" (Mark 1:15). Biblical scholars often point to Isaiah 52:7 as the background to Jesus's proclamation. The Isaiah passage speaks of a messenger who would bring "good news" (LXX: euangelion) of God's kingdom and the announcement of salvation (Heb: yeshuah). Jesus (Heb: Yeshua) identifies himself as both the messenger of Isaiah 52:7 and the suffering servant of Isaiah 53, a linkage that was not unique in Judaism. Craig A. Evans cites multiple sources that link the "good news" of Isaiah 52:7 with the "report" of Isaiah 53:1 (DSS, Targum, Paul, Peter). Thus there is good reason to conjecture that whenever the New Testament authors speak of "the gospel" or "good news," it is a reference to Isaiah 53 as they saw it fulfilled in the life, death, and resurrection of Jesus (i.e., Acts 8:35). The New Testament authors refer to the "good news" (euangelion) 76 times.

Jesus directly quotes and applies Isaiah 53:12 to himself in Luke 22:37. Mark 10:45, quoted above, is not a direct quotation of Isaiah 53, but alludes to it with the theme of serving "many" through death. These two passages provide examples of Jesus's self-understanding as the servant of Isaiah 53.

Several other passages in the Gospels and Acts apply the chapter to Jesus, but not through his own lips. Matthew comments on Jesus's miracles in healing his fellow Israelites, saying that such miracles were a fulfillment of Isaiah 53:4 (Matthew 8:17). A prominent place is given to the chapter in Acts 8:26–40, where an Ethiopian eunuch reads the chapter in the Septuagint and asks Philip, "About whom, I ask you, does the prophet say this, about himself or about someone else?" (Acts 8:34, ESV). Without elaboration, Acts continues, "Then Philip opened his mouth, and beginning with this Scripture he told him the good news about Jesus" (Acts 8:35, ESV). I. Howard Marshall commented as follows on Philip's response: It "implies that even by this early date [30s CE] the recognition that the job description in Isa. 53 fit Jesus, and only Jesus, was current among Christians."

==== Epistles ====
Paul alludes to the themes of Isaiah 53 in 2 Cor 5:19–21, where he identifies Jesus as the sinless one who delivers righteousness to sinners. He says, "in [Jesus] we might become the righteousness of God" (2 Corinthians 5:21). This closely parallels Isaiah 53:11, where it says that the righteous servant "makes the many righteous" (NJPS) and bears the many's punishment. Romans 5:19 follows the same logic about "the many" and righteousness through Christ. In Romans 10:15, Paul identifies the message of salvation in Christ as the "good news" of Isaiah 52:7. Immediately thereafter, he appeals to Isaiah 53:1 and equates the "good news" with the "message" that Israel had rejected (Romans 10:16). With this exegesis, Paul holds that the Jewish rejection of Christ was prophesied by Isaiah, although the rejection was not in full, with Israel coming to believe in Christ at his apocalyptic return (Romans 11). John 12:38 cites Isaiah 53:1 for the same purpose of explaining that the Jewish rejection of Christ had been foretold.

The epistle of 1 Peter gives a prominent place to the text of Isaiah 53. In 1 Peter 2:23–25, at least four quotations and four allusions to Isaiah 53 are present. Carson writes, "Arguably, Peter himself was the first of the apostles to develop Suffering Servant Christology." Peter claims that Jesus's maltreatment and death were foretold in Isaiah 53, and he calls for Jesus's followers to repeat his ethical example through nonresistance.

Hebrews 9:28 includes a reference to Isaiah 53 when it says, "Christ, having been offered once to bear the sins of many...." This use of "the many" and identifying Christ as the one who bears sins follows other NT applications of Isaiah 53:11–12.

=== Pseudepigraphal sources (1st century CE and later) ===
The first-century pseudepigraphal book 4 Ezra includes the line, "Behold, my people is led like a flock to the slaughter" (4 Ezra 15:9). This may be an allusion to Isaiah 53:7, where the servant is interpreted as "my people." However, it could refer instead to Psalm 44:22, which includes a plural subject. The 4 Ezra passage does not have any atonement overtones, and it is Israel's persecutors who are punished by God rather than Israel itself (see LXX above).

Psalms of Solomon 16 includes a hymn attributed to Solomon that includes themes from Isaiah 53. Solomon confesses that he had sinned greatly, saying, "my soul was poured out to death" (Psa. Solomon 16:2) and was in danger of descending to Hades with "the sinner" (cf. Isaiah 53:12). Solomon then praises God that he saved him from this fate, saying that God "did not count me with the sinners for my destruction" (Psa. Solomon 16:5). This also has overtones of Isaiah 53:12. This application of Isaiah 53 to the sinning Solomon ignores the innocence of the servant.

Sibylline Oracles 8.251–336 includes a hymn about Christ that weaves in the themes of Isaiah 53. This Christian section of the oracle may have been added to an originally Jewish version in the second or third centuries.

=== Wisdom of Solomon (1st century CE) ===
The Wisdom of Solomon 2–5, and especially 2:12–24 and 5:1–8, are commonly cited as an early Jewish reworking of the themes of Isaiah 53. The wicked and the righteous are presented as opponents, with the wicked conspiring to oppose and destroy the righteous. After the innocent righteous suffer, the wicked confess their sin and accept the righteousness of the one they rejected.

In Wisdom 2:13, the righteous is called "the servant of the Lord (παῖς κυρίου)" (cf. Isa. 52:13 LXX). The wicked say (Wisdom 2:14), "[The servant] has become a reproof to us of our thoughts; he is burdensome for us even to see," paralleling Isaiah 53:3. The solution of the wicked is, "Let us examine him by insult and torture, that we might know his gentleness and judge his patience. Let us condemn him to a shameful death; for his examination will be by his words” (Wisdom 2:19–20). In Wisdom 5, the wicked recognize their sin and confess. Bailey comments,

The wicked condemn the righteous man to a shameful death in Wis. 2:20. At the final judgment, the wicked “will be amazed” (ekstēsontai) at the unexpected salvation of the righteous man (Wis. 5:2), just as Isaiah's many “will be amazed” (ekstēsontai) at the Servant (Isa. 52:14). Moreover, Wisdom's “we” confess, “it was we who strayed (eplanēthēmen) from the way (hodos) of truth” (Wis. 5:6), just as Isaiah's “we” confess, “All we like sheep have gone astray (eplanēthēmen), each … in his own way (hodos)” (Isa. 53:6). Both groups realize an error in their thinking and the correct alternative.

Although the servant is called a "son of God" who calls God his "father" (Wisdom 2:16–18), the passage does not give any indication that an individual messianic or salvific figure is in view. Bailey comments, "There is no vicarious suffering or sin-bearing of Wisdom's righteous man on behalf of sinners." Wisdom 3:1 says, with an emphasis on the plural, "Righteous souls are in the hand of God, and torment will never touch them." Thus, it would appear that the singular "righteous man" in Wisdom stands as a paradigm for the way the wicked often treat righteous individuals within Israel. The individual represents the pattern of the righteous within the nation, rather than being a singular individual with a unique experience in the nation.

=== Patristic sources (1st through 5th centuries CE) ===
Isaiah 53 was extensively quoted and applied to Jesus by the church fathers. Patristic quotations and allusions to the chapter are innumerable. This section will highlight various important witnesses to the patristic and Jewish views of the chapter as reported in patristic sources.

The earliest example outside the New Testament may be found in 1 Clement 16, circa 95 CE. Another early example is the Epistle of Barnabas 5:2, circa 100 CE. Irenaeus quotes it of Christ in Against Heresies 2.28.5, and Tertullian in Adversus Judaeos 10.

==== Justin Martyr (mid-2nd century CE) ====
Justin Martyr, a second-century Platonic philosopher who converted to Christianity, interpreted Isaiah 53 at length with reference to Jesus. Both Justin's First Apology 50–51 and his Dialogue with Trypho include extended quotations and explanations of the text.

The Dialogue with Trypho (ca. 155 CE) is a purported debate between Justin and the Jewish man Trypho. Scholars disagree on the historicity of the debate, but the Trypho in question may have been Rabbi Tarfon.

Daniel P. Bailey has provided a nearly 100-page chapter on Justin Martyr's use of Isaiah 53 in the Dialogue with Trypho. Bailey writes, "Justin Martyr's Dialogue with Trypho makes the greatest use of Isaiah 53 of any Christian work of the first two centuries." He counts up to 42 different passages that quote or directly allude to Isaiah 53. This includes an extended quotation of the Septuagint version of Isaiah 52:10 through 54:6 in Dialogue 13. According to Bailey, the debate between Justin and Trypho concerning Isaiah 53 was twofold: 1) Do the Hebrew Scriptures in general, and Isaiah 53 in specific, predict a suffering (παθητός, pathetos) Messiah? 2) Does Jesus fit the criteria for being the suffering Messiah so predicted? The men agreed on the first point and disagreed on the second.

Justin's contention is that the Scriptures do predict a suffering Messiah, and he quotes Isaiah 53 repeatedly to make that point. After much argument, Trypho eventually responds,

‘You know very well,’ said Trypho, ‘that we Jews all look forward to the coming of the Christ, and we admit that all your Scriptural quotations refer to Him.... But we doubt whether the Christ should be so shamefully crucified, for the Law declares that he who is crucified is to be accursed (Deuteronomy 21:23). Consequently, you will find me very difficult to convince on this point. It is indeed evident that the Scriptures state that Christ was to suffer, but you will have to show us, if you can, whether it was to be the form of suffering cursed by the Law.’ (Dialogue 89)

Trypho's response, if authentic, speaks to a second-century Jewish understanding of the meaning of Isaiah 53. Trypho agrees with the concept of a suffering Messiah but denies that Jesus could be the Messiah on the grounds of Deuteronomy 21:23. While the Messiah may be subject to suffering in Trypho's mind, a shameful crucifixion would be a step too far. A crucifixion (hanging) of the Messiah would entail God to cursing his Messiah in accordance with the Torah, which Trypho could not accept. Bailey comments,

Rhetorically, by agreeing that the Messiah is to be παθητός, Trypho is already agreeing that the Messiah is prefigured by Isaiah 53. What he wants is a defense of the crucifixion against the curse of Deut 21:23. But here Justin simply offers him more of Isaiah 53, on the assumption that anyone already prepared to accept such a suffering Messiah will not be too offended at a crucified one and will be able to fit this into the picture of Isaiah 53.

In Justin's response to this objection, he stressed that suffering is equivalent to crucifixion, so Isaiah 53's fulfillment in Jesus was self-evident (Dialogue 89). Trypho affirmed that the Messiah was to suffer, but strongly objected that such suffering could include crucifixion, because God would not curse his Messiah with a shameful death (Deut 21:23). Trypho based his argument on Torah, but Justin's response downplayed the Torah and ultimately failed to respond to the argument.

In Bailey's judgment, Trypho's appeal to Deuteronomy 21:23 is a mark of authenticity for the debate on this matter, because Justin never satisfactorily answers the objection, and thus leaves his interpretation of Isaiah 53 without proper defense. Timothy J. Horner also points to Trypho's use of Deuteronomy as a mark of historicity:

[Trypho] is neither Justin's puppet nor is he blindly obdurate. This examination reveals an individual voice with its own sensibility, style, and agenda. It is a voice which defies fiction. His personality is unique, consistent, and idiosyncratic. Perhaps more surprisingly, his function in the text actually weakens Justin's argument in some places.... It is implausible and inappropriate to imagine Justin crafting his Jewish disputant in such a way as to erode some of the basic tenets of his Christian argument.

In sum, the Dialogue with Trypho presents an argument between a second-century Christian and Jew, both of whom agree that Isaiah 53 predicts a suffering Messiah. They disagreed about whether the historical circumstances of Jesus's life, and especially his ignominious death, could be said to match the predictions of Isaiah. Justin said yes; Trypho, based on appeal to the Torah (Deuteronomy 21:23) said no.

==== Origen (early 3rd-century CE) ====
The church father, Platonist, textual critic, and theologian Origen preserved an early witness to the "national" identification of the servant in the Jewish circles of his acquaintance. In his works, he consistently interprets Isaiah 53 in reference to Christ. However, the pagan philosopher Celsus wrote a book criticizing Christianity, and in his arguments, Celsus often employed an anonymous Jew as the one delivering the objections. Circa 248 CE, Origen wrote a response entitled Contra Celsus, where he simultaneously argued against Celsus the man and the Jewish voice that Celsus incorporated. In Contra Celsus 1.55, Origen recalled a personal conversation he had with Jews he was acquainted with:

Now I remember that, on one occasion, at a disputation held with certain Jews, who were reckoned wise men, I quoted these prophecies; to which my Jewish opponent replied, that these predictions bore reference to the whole people, regarded as one individual, and as being in a state of dispersion and suffering, in order that many proselytes might be gained, on account of the dispersion of the Jews among numerous heathen nations. And in this way he explained the words, “Thy form shall be of no reputation among men;” and then, “They to whom no message was sent respecting him shall see;” and the expression, “A man under suffering.” Many arguments were employed on that occasion during the discussion to prove that these predictions regarding one particular person were not rightly applied by them to the whole nation.... But we seemed to press them hardest with the expression, “Because of the iniquities of My people was He led away unto death.” [Isaiah 53:8 LXX] For if the people, according to them, are the subject of the prophecy, how is the man said to be led away to death because of the iniquities of the people of God, unless he be a different person from that people of God?

In this report, the Origen's Jewish interlocutors interpreted Isaiah 53 as a description of the entire nation of Israel while suffering in the diaspora. They cited the disrespect and ill repute of Jews in the eyes of the Gentile nations, as well as the suffering the entire nation endured as if one individual. In reference to the redemptive themes of Isaiah 53, the Jewish interlocutors said that Israel's suffering was for the purpose of an increase in proselytes to Judaism, a reference to pre-Constantinian Jewish missionization hopes. Origen's response, based on the Septuagint of Isaiah 53:8 (which has "unto death"), responded that the reference to "my people" ought to distinguish the servant from being equivalent to the nation.

=== Midrash (Talmudic Era and later) ===
Midrash Tanchuma Buber interprets Isaiah 52:13 concerning the greatness of Messiah:

What is the meaning of Who are you, O great mountain? This is the Messianic King. Then why does it call him great mountain? Because he is greater than the ancestors, as stated (in Is. 52:13): Behold, my servant shall bring low. He shall be exalted, lifted up, and become exceedingly tall. He shall be exalted (rt.: RWM) more than Abraham, lifted up more than Moses, and become exceedingly tall, more so than the ministering angels.

Ruth Rabbah 5.6 includes multiple interpretations of Boaz' statement to Ruth in Ruth 2.14. The fifth interpretation includes a reference to Isaiah 53:5, interpreted as describing the sufferings of Messiah: "The fifth interpretation makes it refer to the Messiah. Come hither:' approach to royal state. And eat of the bread refers to the bread of royalty; And dip thy morsel in the vinegar refers to his sufferings, as it is said, But he was wounded because of our transgressions (Isaiah 53:5). And she sat beside the reapers, for he will be deprived of his sovereignty for a time."

Although the allusion is not certain, it is possible that Sifre Numbers 131 identifies Pinchas (cf. Numbers 25:13) with the one in Isaiah 53:12 who makes atonement for the people of Israel.

Sifre Deuteronomy 355 interprets Isaiah 53:12 as an end-times description of Moses' honor at the head of Israel's scholars.

Numbers Rabbah, quoting Isaiah 53:12, interprets the verse in terms of Israel's final redemption: "Because Israel exposed their souls to death in exile-as you read, Because he bared his soul unto death (Isa. LIII, 12) – and busied themselves with the Torah which is sweeter than honey, the Holy One, blessed be He, will therefore in the hereafter give them to drink of the wine that is preserved in its grapes since the six days of Creation, and will let them bathe in rivers of milk."

==== Pesikta of Rav Kahana ====
The Pesikta of Rav Kahana includes extended interpretations of the one who brings "good news" in Isaiah 52:7. Various interpretations are given, including Isaiah himself and the returned exiles of Israel in the era of redemption (Supplement 5.1–2). The verse is also interpreted of king Messiah in two places (Piska 5.9, Supplement 5.4). In Piska 5.9, Rabbi Johanan interprets as follows:

And the voice of the turtle (twr) is heard in our land (Song 2:12), words which mean, according to R. Johanan, that the voice of the king Messiah, the voice of the one who will lead us with great care through the final turnings (tyyr) of our journey is heard in the land: “How beautiful upon the mountains are the feet of the messenger of good tidings” (Isa. 52:7).

In Piska 19.5, Rabbi Abbahu cites Isaiah 53:10 as evidence for why a sick person who sees a seminal emission should be encouraged that his health is improving.

=== Modern views ===
According to some modern scholars (among whom include Christians), the suffering servant described in Isaiah chapter 53 is actually the Jewish people in its original context. Other scholars argue that the servant is an individual figure.

A number of Christian scholars presented a view developed by Walter C. Kaiser and popularized by Raymond E. Brown, in which the Latin phrase sensus plenior is used in biblical exegesis to describe the supposed deeper meaning intended by God but not by the human author.

Brown defines sensus plenior as

That additional, deeper meaning, intended by God but not clearly intended by the human author, which is seen to exist in the words of a biblical text (or group of texts, or even a whole book) when they are studied in the light of further revelation or development in the understanding of revelation.

John Goldingay claimed that the citation of Isaiah 7:14 in Matthew 1:23 is a "stock example" of sensus plenior. In this view, the life and ministry of Jesus is considered the revelation of these deeper meanings, such as with Isaiah 53, regardless of the original context of passages quoted in the New Testament.

Amy-Jill Levine and Marc Brettler argue that Isaiah 53 describes a figure from the Babylonian exile living during the author's own time rather than a messianic prediction, viewing the servant's suffering as a symbol for the nation exiled and then later undergoing a restoration.

== Legacy ==
=== Jewish–Christian relations ===
==== Before 1000 ====
The earliest known example of a Jew and a Christian debating the meaning of Isaiah 53 is the example from 248 cited by Origen. In Christian church father Origen's Contra Celsum, written in 248, he writes of Isaiah 53:

Now I remember that, on one occasion, at a disputation held with certain Jews, who were reckoned wise men, I quoted these prophecies; to which my Jewish opponent replied, that these predictions bore reference to the whole people, regarded as one individual, and as being in a state of dispersion and suffering, in order that many proselytes might be gained, on account of the dispersion of the Jews among numerous heathen nations.

The discourse between Origen and his Jewish counterpart does not seem to have had any consequences for either party. This was not the case for the majority of centuries that have passed since that time. In Ecclesiastes Rabbah 1:24, written in the 700s, a debate about a much less controversial topic results in the arrest of the Jew engaging in the debate.

==== 1000–1500 ====
In 1263, at the Disputation of Barcelona, Nachmanides expressed the Jewish viewpoint of Isaiah 53 and other matters regarding Christian belief about Jesus's role in Hebrew Scripture. The disputation was awarded in his favor by James I of Aragon, and as a result the Dominican Order compelled him to flee from Spain for the remainder of his life. Passages of Talmud were also censored.

==== Modern era ====
The use of Isaiah 53 in debates between Jews and Christians still often occurs in the context of Christian missionary work among Jews, and the topic is a source of frequent discussion that is often repetitive and heated. Some devout Christians view the use of the Christian interpretation of Isaiah 53 in targeted conversion of Jews as a special act of Christian love and a fulfillment of Jesus Christ's teaching of the Great Commission. The unchanged common view among many Jews today, including Karaites, is that if the entire book of Isaiah is read from start to finish, in Hebrew, then it is clear that Isaiah 53 is not talking about one individual but instead the nation of Israel as a whole. Some believe the individual to be Hezekiah, who, according to Isaiah 38:5, lived another 15 years (i.e., "prolonging his days") after praying to God while ill (i.e., "acquainted with grief"). His son and successor, Manasseh, was born during this time, thereby allowing Hezekiah to see his "offspring."

The phrase "like sheep to the slaughter", used to describe alleged Jewish passivity during the Holocaust, derives from Isaiah 53:7.

==== Jewish counter-missionary view ====
International Jewish counter-missionary organizations such as Outreach Judaism or Jews for Judaism respond directly to the issues raised by Christian missionaries concerning Isaiah 53 and explore Judaism in contradistinction to Christianity.

=== Christian Music ===
The King James Version of verses 3–6 and 8 from this chapter is cited as texts in the English-language oratorio Messiah by George Frideric Handel (HWV 56).

The New International Version of verse 6 from this chapter is used as the basis for the 1996 song ‘Isaiah 53:6’ by Colin Buchanan.

== Jewish literature ==
=== Talmud ===
The Talmud refers occasionally to Isaiah 53:

- The first book of the Talmud—Berachot 5a applies Isaiah 53 to the people of Israel and those who study Torah—"If the Holy One, blessed be He, is pleased with Israel or man, He crushes him with painful sufferings. For it is said: And the Lord was pleased with [him, hence] He crushed him by disease (Isa. 53:10). Now, you might think that this is so even if he did not accept them with love. Therefore it is said: "To see if his soul would offer itself in restitution" (Isa. 53:10). Even as the trespass-offering must be brought by consent, so also the sufferings must be endured with consent. And if he did accept them, what is his reward? "He will see his seed, prolong his days" (Isa. 53:10). And more than that, his knowledge [of the Torah] will endure with him. For it is said: "The purpose of the Lord will prosper in his hand" (Isa. 53:10). It has been taught: R. Simeon b. Yohai says: The Holy One, blessed be He, gave Israel three precious gifts, and all of them were given only through sufferings.. These are: The Torah, the Land of Israel and the World To Come."
- Sotah 14a in the Babylonian Talmud associates Isaiah 53:12 with Moses and Jerusalem Talmud Shekalim 5:1 applies this verse to Rabbi Akiva, because they were amongst the transgressors and both stood up for the nation of Israel.
- Sanhedrin 98b in the Babylonian Talmud speculates rather ironically about the undisclosed name of the unrevealed Jewish Messiah to come, so as to say it could be anyone: leper of the school (a hint on rabbinical disciples cast out of their seminary/school) based on Isaiah 53:4, Rabbi Nachman based on Jeremiah 30:21, Shiloh based on Genesis 49:10, Yinon based on Psalm 72:17, Rabbi Hanina reckons it is him, based on Jeremiah 16:13, Menachem ben Hizkija based on Lamentations 1:16.
- Both the Talmud and Midrash apply Isaiah 53 to the sick:

Talmud—Berachoth 57b

Six things are a good sign for a sick person, namely, sneezing, perspiration, open bowels, seminal emission, sleep and a dream. Sneezing, as it is written: His sneezings flash forth light.^{15} Perspiration, as it is written, In the sweat of thy face shalt thou eat bread.^{16} Open bowels, as it is written: If lie that is bent down hasteneth to be loosed, he shall not go down dying to the pit.^{17} Seminal emission, as it is written: Seeing seed, he will prolong his days.^{18} Sleep, as it is written: I should have slept, then should I have been at rest.^{19} A dream, as it is written: Thou didst cause me to dream and make me to live.^{20} (15) Job XLI, 10. (16) Gen. III, 19. (17) Isa. LI, 14. E.V. "He that is bent down shall speedily, etc." (18) Isa. LIII, 10. (19) Job. III, 13. (20) Isa. XXXVIII, 16. V. p. 335, n. 10.

Midrash Rabbah—Genesis XX:10

Five things which are a favorable omen for an invalid, viz.: sneezing, perspiring, sleep, a dream, and semen. Sneezing, as it is written, His sneezing flash forth light (Job XLI, 10); sweat: In the Sweat of Thy Face Shalt Thou Eat Bread^{3}; sleep: I had slept: then it were well with me (Job III, 13)^{4}; a dream: Wherefore make me dream [E.V. 'recover Thou me'] and make me live (Isa. XXXVIII, 16); semen: He shall see seed [i.e. semen], and prolong his days (Isa. LIII,10)

=== Midrash ===
The midrashic method of biblical exegesis, is "... going more deeply than the mere literal sense, attempts to penetrate into the spirit of the Scriptures, to examine the text from all sides, and thereby to derive interpretations which are not immediately obvious":

- The exegetical Midrash Ruth Rabbah, which expounds the Book of Ruth chapter by chapter, verse by verse, and, sometimes, word by word, states that the Messiah is coming to descend from Ruth through King David. Ruth Rabbah relates to events within the narrative reality of the Book of Ruth (Ruth 1) as allegorical allusions to the future of her descendants. Ruth's modesty, her great beauty, her uprightness narrate the positive picture of her as a righteous gentile woman in the bible. Her acts of kindness toward Naomi (Ruth Rabbah 2:14) was associated with Isaiah 53:5. In Ruth Rabbah 2:14, Rabbi Ze'ira's classic midrashic statement: "R. Zei'ra said: This scroll [of Ruth] tells us nothing either of cleanliness or of uncleanliness, either of prohibition or permission. For what purpose then was it written? To teach how great is the reward of those who do deeds of kindness...."
- Numbers Rabbah 13:2 applies Is 53:12 to Israel in exile—"There can be almost no doubt that the redactor of Numbers Rabbah had before him an ancient Midrash on Numbers, and perhaps on other books as well, which has not come down to us and which we do not know of today. From the nature of the passages that were incorporated from this work and that remain in the Numbers Rabbah that we have today, one may conclude that this Midrash belonged to the group of Tanhuma-style Midrashim."
- Eliyahu Rabbah, which scholars agree was written in the end of the tenth century, has 3 citations referenced to Isaiah 53 in the Midrash known as Tana Devei Eliyahu, applying them to the righteous of Israel (chapters 6, 13, 27).
- Midrash Psalms 94:2 applies Isaiah 53:10 to the righteous in general (also in other earlier writings—Mechilta De Rabbi Ishmael)

Midrash Rabbah—Exodus XIX:6 In this world, when Israel ate the paschal lamb in Egypt, they did so in haste, as it is said: And thus shall ye eat it, etc. (Ex. XII, 11), For in haste didst thou come forth out of the land of Egypt (Deut. XVI, 3), but in the Messianic era, we are told: For ye shall not go out in haste, neither shall ye go by flight (Isa. LII, 12).

Midrash Rabbah—Numbers XIII:2 Israel exposed (he'eru) their souls to death in exile-as you read, Because he bared (he'era) his soul unto death (Isa. LIII, 12) – and busied themselves with the Torah which is sweeter than honey, the Holy One, blessed be He, will therefore in the hereafter give them to drink of the wine that is preserved in its grapes since the six days of Creation, and will let them bathe in rivers of milk.

Midrash Rabbah—Ruth V:6 6. And Boaz said unto her at meal time: come hither, and eat of the bread, and dip thy morsel in the vinegar. And she sat beside the reapers; and they reached her parched corn, and she did eat and was satisfied and left thereof (II, 14). R. Jonathan interpreted this verse in six ways. The first refers it to David.... The fifth interpretation makes it refer to the Messiah. Come hither: approach to royal state. And eat of the bread refers to the bread of royalty; And dip thy morsel in the vinegar refers to his sufferings, as it is said, But he was wounded because of our transgressions (Isa. LIII, 5).

=== Zohar ===
The Zohar is the foundational work in the literature of Jewish mystical Kabbalah. It references to Isaiah 53 in a wide variety:

- 52:13–14 is applied to the Angel Metatron in Zohar Volume I 182a.
- 53:5 is applied to Elijah the prophet in Zohar Volume II 115b.
- 53:5 is applied to Moshiach ben Yosef in Zohar Volume III 276b.
- 52:13 is applied to Moshe in Zohar Volume III page 153b.
- 52:13, 53:2,5 is applied to Moshe in Zohar Volume III 280a.
- 53:1 is applied to Moshe in Tekunei HaZohar page 43a.
- 53:5 is applied to Moshe in Tekunei HaZohar page 54b and 112a.
- 53:5,7 is applied to Moshe in Zohar Volume III 125b.
- 53:5–7 is applied to Moshe in Zohar Volume III 282b.
- 53:7 is applied to Moshe in Zohar Volume I 187a.
- 53:10 is applied to Moshe in Zohar Volume II 29b.
- 52:12 is applied to the Righteous of Israel in Zohar Chadash page 15a
- 52:13 is applied to the Righteous of Israel in Zohar Volume I 181a.
- 53:5 is applied to the Righteous of Israel in Zohar Volume III 218a, 231a, 247b
- 53:10 is applied to the Righteous of Israel in Zohar Volume I 140a; Volume II 244b; Volume III 57b

Soncino Zohar, Genesis/Bereshit, Section 1, Page 140a

"The Lord trieth the righteous" (Ps. XI, 5). For what reason? Said R. Simeon: "Because when God finds delight in the righteous, He brings upon them sufferings, as it is written: 'Yet it pleased the Lord to crush him by disease'" (Is. LIII, 10), as explained elsewhere. God finds delight in the soul but not in the body, as the soul resembles the supernal soul, whereas the body is not worthy to be allied to the supernal essences, although the image of the body is part of the supernal symbolism.

Soncino Zohar, Genesis/Bereshit, Section 1, Page 140b

Observe that when God takes delight in the soul of a man, He afflicts the body in order that the soul may gain full freedom. For so long as the soul is together with the body it cannot exercise its full powers, but only when the body is broken and crushed. Again, "He trieth the righteous", so as to make them firm like "a tried stone", the "costly corner-stone" mentioned by the prophet (Is. XXVIII, 16).

Soncino Zohar, Genesis/Bereshit, Section 1, Page 181a

R. Simeon further discoursed on the text: Behold, My servant shall prosper, he shall be exalted and lifted up, and shall be very high (Is. LII, 13). "Happy is the portion of the righteous", he said, "to whom the Holy One reveals the ways of the Torah that they may walk in them."

Soncino Zohar, Genesis/Bereshit, Section 1, Page 187a

Observe the Scriptural text: "And Abraham took another wife, and her name was Keturah" (Gen. xxv, 1). Herein is an allusion to the soul which after death comes to earth to be built up as before. Observe that of the body it is written: "And it pleased the Lord to crush him by disease; to see if his soul would offer itself in restitution, that he might see his seed, and prolong his days, and that the purpose of the Lord might prosper by his hand." (Is. LIII, 10). That is to say, if the soul desires to be rehabilitated then he must see seed, for the soul hovers round about and is ready to enter the seed of procreation, and thus "he will prolong his days, and the purpose of the Lord", namely the Torah, "will prosper in his hand". For although a man labours in the Torah day and night, yet if his source remains fruitless, he will find no place by which to enter within the Heavenly curtain.

Soncino Zohar, Exodus/Shemot, Section 2, Page 29b

R. Simeon quoted here the verse: "A voice is heard in Ramah, lamentation and bitter weeping, Rachel weeping for her children, because they were not" (Jer. XXXI, I5). 'The Community of Israel is called "Rachel", as it says, "As a sheep (rahel) before her shearers is dumb" (Isa. LIII, 7). Why dumb? Because when other nations rule over her the voice departs from her and she becomes dumb. "Ramah"

Soncino Zohar, Exodus/Shemot, Section 2, Page 212a

When the Messiah hears of the great suffering of Israel in their dispersion, and of the wicked amongst them who seek not to know their Master, he weeps aloud on account of those wicked ones amongst them, as it is written: "But he was wounded because of our transgression, he was crushed because of our iniquities" (Isa. LIII, 5). The souls then return to their place. The Messiah, on his part, enters a certain Hall in the Garden of Eden, called the Hall of the Afflicted. There he calls for all the diseases and pains and sufferings of Israel, bidding them settle on himself, which they do. And were it not that he thus eases the burden from Israel, taking it on himself, no one could endure the sufferings meted out to Israel in expiation on account of their neglect of the Torah. So Scripture says; "Surely our diseases he did bear," etc. (Isa. LIII, 4). A similar function was performed by R. Eleazar here on earth. For, indeed, beyond number are the chastisements awaiting every man daily for the neglect of the Torah, all of which descended into the world at the time when the Torah was given. As long as Israel were in the Holy Land, by means of the Temple service and sacrifices they averted all evil diseases and afflictions from the world. Now it is the Messiah who is the means of averting them from mankind until the time when a man quits this world and receives his punishment, as already said. When a man's sins are so numerous that he has to pass through the nethermost compartments of Gehinnom in order to receive heavier punishment corresponding to the contamination of his soul, a more intense fire is kindled in order to consume that contamination. The destroying angels make use for this purpose of fiery rods, so as to expel that contamination. Woe to the soul that is subjected to such punishment! Happy are those who guard the precepts of the Torah!

Soncino Zohar, Leviticus/Vayikra, Section 3, Page 57b

"It has been taught in the name of R. Jose that on this day of Atonement it has been instituted that this portion should be read to atone for Israel in captivity. Hence we learn that if the chastisements of the Lord come upon a man, they are an atonement for his sins, and whoever sorrows for the sufferings of the righteous obtains pardon for his sins. Therefore on this day we read the portion commencing 'after the death of the two sons of Aaron', that the people may hear and lament the loss of the righteous and obtain forgiveness for their sins. For whenever a man so laments and sheds tears for them, God proclaims of him, 'thine iniquity is taken away and thy sin purged' (Isa. Vl, 7). Also he may be assured that his sons will not die in his lifetime, and of him it is written, 'he shall see seed, he shall prolong days (Isa. LIII, 19).'"

Soncino Zohar, Numbers/Bamidbar, Section 3, Page 218a

When God desires to give healing to the world He smites one righteous man among them with disease and suffering, and through him gives healing to all, as it is written, "But he was wounded for our transgressions, he was bruised for our iniquities... and with his stripes we are healed" (Isa. LIII, 5)

Soncino Zohar, Exodus/Shemot, Section 2, Page 16b

Why is Israel subjected to all nations? In order that the world may be preserved through them.

=== Commentators ===
- Kuzari also identifies Isaiah 53 as the nation of Israel.
- Chovot ha-Levavot also identifies Isaiah 53 as the nation of Israel.
- The Mahari Kara (R' Yosef Kara, a contemporary of Rashi 11th century) on Isaiah Isaiah 52:13: Quote: "Behold My servant shall prosper: Israel My servant shall be exalted and lifted up, and shall be very high. And [according to] the teachings of our Rabbis: He shall be more exalted than Abraham, as it is written: "I have raised my hand toward the Lord...." [Gen 14:22]. He shall be more lifted up than Moses, as it is written: "... as the nurse lifts up the suckling...." And he [Israel] shall be higher than the ministering angels, as it is written: "And they had backs, and they were very high...." [Ezek 1:18].

== See also ==
- Arrest of Jesus
- Burial of Jesus
- Christianity and Judaism
- Crucifixion of Jesus
- Holy Week
- Messiah in Judaism
- New Covenant, Supersessions
- Old Testament messianic prophecies quoted in the New Testament
- Resurrection of Jesus
- Trial of Jesus
- Related Bible parts: Psalm 22, Isaiah 42, Isaiah 49, Isaiah 50, Isaiah 52, Matthew 8, Matthew 27, Mark 14, Luke 23, Luke 24, Acts 8, Romans 5, 1 Peter 2

== Bibliography ==
- Würthwein, Ernst (1995). The Text of the Old Testament. Translated by Rhodes, Erroll F. Grand Rapids, Michigan: Wm. B. Eerdmans. ISBN 0-8028-0788-7.
