= Isaiah 49 =

Book of Isaiah, chapter 49

- ← chapter 48 chapter 50 →
- The Great Isaiah Scroll, the best preserved of the biblical scrolls found at Qumran from the second century BC, contains all the verses in this chapter.
- Book: Book of Isaiah
- Hebrew Bible part: Nevi'im
- Order in the Hebrew part: 5
- Category: Latter Prophets
- Christian Bible part: Old Testament
- Order in the Christian part: 23

Isaiah 49 is the forty-ninth chapter of the Book of Isaiah in the Hebrew Bible or the Old Testament of the Christian Bible. This book contains the prophecies attributed to the prophet Isaiah, and is one of the Books of the Prophets. Chapters 40-55 are known as "Deutero-Isaiah" and date from the time of the Israelites' exile in Babylon. This chapter includes the second of the songs of the "Suffering Servant".

== Text ==
The original text was written in Hebrew language. This chapter is divided into 26 verses.

=== Textual witnesses ===
Some early manuscripts containing the text of this chapter in Hebrew are of the Masoretic Text tradition, which includes the Codex Cairensis (895), the Petersburg Codex of the Prophets (916), Aleppo Codex (10th century), Codex Leningradensis (1008).

Fragments containing parts of this chapter were found among the Dead Sea Scrolls (3rd century BC or later):

- 1QIsa^{a}: complete
- 1QIsa^{b}: extant: verses 1‑13, 15
- 4QIsa^{b} (4Q56): extant: verses 21-23
- 4QIsa^{d} (4Q58): extant: verses 1‑15

There is also a translation into Koine Greek known as the Septuagint, made in the last few centuries BCE. Extant ancient manuscripts of the Septuagint version include Codex Vaticanus (B; $\mathfrak{G}$^{B}; 4th century), Codex Sinaiticus (S; BHK: $\mathfrak{G}$^{S}; 4th century), Codex Alexandrinus (A; $\mathfrak{G}$^{A}; 5th century) and Codex Marchalianus (Q; $\mathfrak{G}$^{Q}; 6th century).

== Parashot ==
The parashah sections listed here are based on the Aleppo Codex. Isaiah 49 is a part of the Consolations (Isaiah 40–66). {P}: open parashah; {S}: closed parashah.

{P} 49:1-4 {S} 49:5-6 {S} 49:7 {S} 49:8-13 {S} 49:14-21 {P} 49:22-23 {S} 49:24 {S} 49:25-26 {S}

== Second servant song (49:1–12) ==
The servant songs are four poems within the Book of Isaiah written about a certain "servant of YHWH". God calls the servant to lead the nations, but the servant is horribly repressed. In the end, he is rewarded. Those four poems are:

1. Isaiah 42:1–9
2. Isaiah 49:1–12
3. Isaiah 50:4–9
4. Isaiah 52-53

The second of the "servant songs" begins at Isaiah 49:1, continuing through 49:12. This poem, written from the Servant's point of view, is an account of his pre-natal calling by God to lead both Israel and the nations. The Servant is now portrayed as the prophet of the Lord equipped and called to restore the nation to God. Yet, anticipating the fourth song, he is without success. Taken with the picture of the Servant in the first song, his success will come not by political or military action, but by becoming a light to the Gentiles. Ultimately his victory is in God's hands.

=== Verse 1 ===
Listen, O isles, unto me; and hearken, ye people, from far;
The LORD hath called me from the womb;

from the bowels of my mother hath he made mention of my name.

- "Isles" (KJV; NKJV: "coastlands" or "islands") are frequently referred to in Deutero-Isaiah (Isaiah 40–55). The first reference is in 40:15.

=== Verse 11 ===
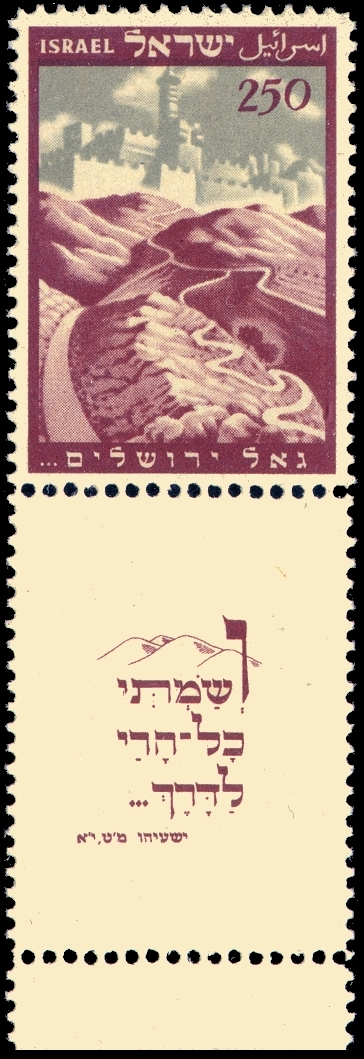
Inscription on the stamp "He has redeemed Jerusalem..." with inscription on tab: "And I will make all my mountains a way... , Isaiah 49:11". Jerusalem stamp - 250 mil.

And I will make all my mountains a way, and my highways shall be exalted.

- "Shall be exalted" or "shall be elevated" is translated from the Hebrew word יְרֻמֽוּן, yə-ru-mūn, in the sense of being "lifted up" into "well-made roads".

=== Verse 12 ===
Behold, these shall come from far:
and, lo, these from the north and from the west;

and these from the land of Sinim.

- "Sinim" (Hebrew: סִינִֽים, sî-nîm; NIV: "Aswan" based on 'Dead Sea Scrolls'): a word that only found here in the Bible, could be interpreted as "Persia" (Septuagint Greek: γῆς Περσῶν, tes Person), "the South" (Vulgate Latin: terra australi) or even "China" (cf. the English term 'sinologist' comes from the Greek word for 'Chinese'), but the most can be said safely is that verse 12 foresees many converts coming from far distant places, of which 'Sinim' was a notable example.

== Comfort for Jerusalem (49:14–26) ==
=== Verse 16 ===
See, I have inscribed you on the palms of My hands;
Your walls are continually before Me.

Biblical translator and commentator Robert Lowth suggests that there was "some practice, common among the Jews at that time, of making marks on their hands or arms by punctures on the skin, with some sort of sign or representation of the city (i.e. Jerusalem) or temple, to shew their affection and zeal for it".

=== Verse 22 ===
Thus saith the Lord GOD,

Behold, I will lift up mine hand to the Gentiles, and set up my standard to the people:
and they shall bring thy sons in their arms, and thy daughters shall be carried upon their shoulders.

- Cross reference: Isaiah 2:3; Isaiah 11:10; Isaiah 43:6; Isaiah 60:3; Isaiah 66:12

== See also ==
- Christian messianic prophecies
- Christianity and Judaism
- Great Commission
- Jewish messianism
- Messianic prophecies of Jesus
- New Covenant, Replacement theology
- Related Bible parts: Isaiah 42, Isaiah 50, Isaiah 52, Isaiah 53, Matthew 28, Luke 1, John 8, Acts 1

== Sources ==
- Kidner, Derek (1994). "Isaiah". In Carson, D. A.; France, R. T.; Motyer, J. A.; Wenham, G. J. (eds.). New Bible Commentary: 21st Century Edition (4, illustrated, reprint, revised ed.). Inter-Varsity Press. pp. 629–670. ISBN 9780851106489.
- Würthwein, Ernst (1995). The Text of the Old Testament. Translated by Rhodes, Erroll F. Grand Rapids, MI: Wm. B. Eerdmans. ISBN 0-8028-0788-7.
