= Sensus plenior =

Fuller meaning in biblical exegesis

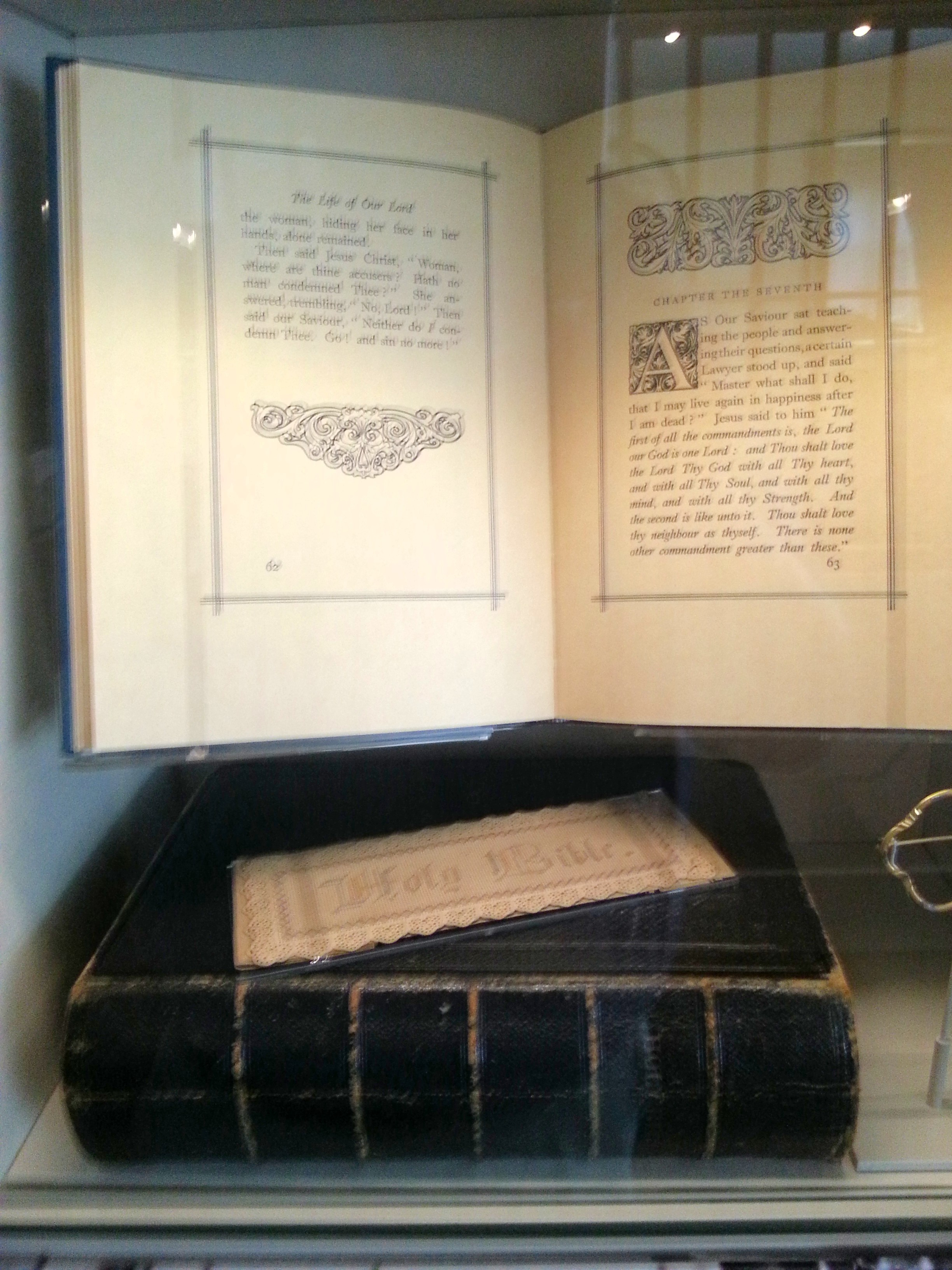
The Holy Bible

Sensus plenior is a Latin phrase that means "fuller sense" or "fuller meaning". It is used in Biblical exegesis to describe the supposed deeper meaning intended by God but not by the human author. Walter C. Kaiser notes that the term was coined by F. Andre Fernandez in 1927 but was popularized by Raymond E. Brown.

Brown defines sensus plenior as

That additional, deeper meaning, intended by God but not clearly intended by the human author, which is seen to exist in the words of a biblical text (or group of texts, or even a whole book) when they are studied in the light of further revelation or development in the understanding of revelation.

That implies that more meaning can be found within scripture than the original human authors intended and so the study of scripture that isolates a particular book and concerns itself only with the details of the author's time and situation can be incomplete.

Sensus plenior corresponds to rabbinical interpretations of the Hebrew Scriptures, remez ("hint"), drash ("search"), and/or sod ("secret"), by which deeper meaning is drawn out or from the text.

John Goldingay suggests that the citation of Isaiah 7:14 in Matthew 1:23 is a "stock example" of sensus plenior.

Conservative Christians have used the term to mean the larger or whole teaching of scripture.

== See also ==
- Peshat
- Progressive Revelation
