= Progressive revelation =

Progressive revelation may refer to:

- Progressive revelation (Bahá'í), a core teaching of the Bahá'í Faith, that suggests that religious truth is revealed by God progressively and cyclically over time
- Progressive revelation (Christianity), the concept that the sections of the Bible that were written later contain a fuller revelation of God compared to the earlier sections

== See also ==
Progressive disclosure
