= Old Testament messianic prophecies quoted in the New Testament =

The books of the New Testament frequently cite Jewish scripture to support the claim of the Early Christians that Jesus was the promised Jewish Messiah. Scholars have observed that few of these citations are actual predictions in context; the majority of these quotations and references are taken from the prophetic Book of Isaiah, but they range over the entire corpus of Jewish writings.

Jews do not regard any of these as having been fulfilled by Jesus, and in some cases do not regard them as messianic prophecies at all. Old Testament prophecies that were regarded as referring to the arrival of Christ are either not thought to be prophecies by critical biblical scholars, as the verses make no stated claim of being predictions, or are seen as having no correlation as they do not explicitly refer to the Messiah. Historical criticism has been agreed to be a field that is unable to argue for the evidential fulfillment of prophecy, or that Jesus was indeed the Messiah because he fulfilled messianic prophecies, as it cannot "construct such an argument" within that academic method, since it is a theological claim. Ancient Jews before the first century CE had a variety of views about the Messiah, but none included a Jesus-like Savior. Mainstream Bible scholars state that no view of the Messiah as based on the Old Testament predicted a Messiah who would suffer and die for the sins of all people, and that the story of Jesus' death, therefore, involved a profound shift in meaning from the Old Testament tradition.

While Bible scholars have claimed that the Gospels misquoted the Hebrew Bible, some Christian theologians argue the New Testament authors read the Bible through figural reading, where a meaning is realized only after a second event adds new significance to the first. Approaches include sensus plenior, where a text contains both a literal authorial meaning and deeper ones by God that the original writers did not realize.

== Overview: prophecy and biblical scholarship ==
The Hebrew scriptures were an important source for the New Testament authors. There are 27 direct quotations in the Gospel of Mark, 54 in Matthew, 24 in Luke, and 14 in John, and the influence of the scriptures is vastly increased when allusions and echoes are included, with half of Mark's gospel being made up of allusions to and citations of the scriptures. Matthew contains all Mark's quotations and introduces around 30 more, sometimes in the mouth of Jesus, sometimes as his own commentary on the narrative, and Luke makes allusions to all but three of the Old Testament books.

An example of one is Matthew 1:23: "'Look, the virgin shall conceive and bear a son, and they shall name him Emmanuel,' which means, 'God is with us.'". This references Isaiah 7:14: "therefore the Lord himself shall give you a sign: the maiden is with child and she will bear a son, and will call his name Immanuel".

The Hebrew word translated here as "maiden" is almah, meaning a young woman who is ripe for marriage, i.e. aged less than 13, or between 12 and 14 years old, according to other sources, rather than a virgin. Matthew, however, used the Septuagint text of Isaiah rather than the Hebrew text, and the word that appears there is παρθένος (parthenos), meaning virgin.

== Prophecies Christians consider fulfilled ==
=== Daniel 9:24–27 ===
Seventy weeks are decreed for your people and your holy city: to finish the transgression, to put an end to sin, and to atone for iniquity, to bring in everlasting righteousness, to seal both vision and prophet, and to anoint a most holy place. Know therefore and understand: from the time that the word went out to restore and rebuild Jerusalem until the time of an anointed prince, there shall be seven weeks; and for sixty-two weeks it shall be built again with streets and moat, but in a troubled time. After the sixty-two weeks, an anointed one shall be cut off and shall have nothing, and the troops of the prince who is to come shall destroy the city and the sanctuary. Its end shall come with a flood, and to the end there shall be war. Desolations are decreed. He shall make a strong covenant with many for one week, and for half of the week he shall make sacrifice and offering cease; and in their place shall be an abomination that desolates, until the decreed end is poured out upon the desolator.

— Daniel 9:24–27

The general scholarly view is that the author of Daniel is writing a contemporaneous account of the Maccabean Revolt c. 167 BCE and the "an anointed one shall be cut off" refers to the murder of the high priest Onias III; the "abomination that desolates" refers to Antiochus IV Epiphanes erecting a statue of Zeus in the Temple. References to "most holy", "anointed one" and "prince" have been interpreted by Christians as speaking of Jesus, and the phrase "anointed one shall be cut off" as pointing to his crucifixion, the "troops of the prince who is to come" being taken to refer to the Romans who destroyed Jerusalem and the Temple in 70 AD.

=== Deuteronomy 18:15 ===
Deuteronomy 18 speaks of a prophet who would be raised up from among the Jewish nation:

The LORD will raise up for you a prophet like me from among yourselves, from your own kinsmen. You are to pay attention to him ... ^{18} I will raise up for them a prophet like you from among their kinsmen. I will put my words in his mouth, and he will tell them everything I order him. (CJB)

By the time of Jesus, this promise of Moses was understood to refer to a special individual. In John 6:14, after the multiplication of the loaves, people are quoted as saying, "This is truly the Prophet, the one who is to come into the world." In John 7:40, On the last day of the feast (tabernacles/Booths), the great day...Many of the people, therefore, when they heard this saying, said, Of a truth this is the Prophet. In Acts 3:18–22, Peter said that Jesus was the fulfillment of this promise.

=== Ezekiel 37:24, 25–27 ===
And David my servant [shall be] king over them; and they all shall have one shepherd: they shall also walk in my judgments, and observe my statutes, and do them.

— Ezekiel 37:24, KJV

Ezekiel 37:24 refers to a person coming from the House of David as the servant of God, unique Shepherd of Israel, which will rule over the House of Judah (v. 16) and over the Tribe of Joseph (v. 17) so that he will "make them one stick, and they shall be one in mine hand" (v. 19), in a unique nation of Israel.

Verses from to 15 to 24 cannot be referring to King David, since the united monarchy of Israel was divided in two reigns after the death of his son, Solomon (999–931 BCE). Furthermore, Ezekiel (622–570 BCE) wrote in the seventh century BCE, four centuries after this subject of the biblical narration, nevertheless adopting a prophecy that is by its nature usually referred to future happenings. Therefore, as the "stick of Judah" stands for the House of Judah, and the "stick of Joseph" stands for his tribe (verse 19), the expression "David my servant shall be king over them" (verse 24) may be read as a prophecy about a person of the House of David, which would have ruled over one nation in one land, gathered upon the mountains of Israel on every side of the earth.

The narration continues as follows:

They will live in the land I gave to Ya'akov my servant, where your ancestors lived; they will live there – they, their children, and their grandchildren, forever; and David my servant will be their leader forever. I will make a covenant of peace with them, an everlasting covenant. I will give to them, increase their numbers, and set my Sanctuary among them forever. My dwelling place will be with them; I will be their God, and they will be my people. (CJB)

They will "live" ('made for thee to dwell' [KJV/ESV] in Song of The Sea Exodus 15:17) in the land. The "dwelling place" (Hebrew mishkan מִשְׁכָּן Exodus 25:9) recalls the wilderness tabernacle. The Sanctuary (Hebrew miqdash מִקְדָּשׁ Exodus 15:17) points rather to the Temple, in particular the renewed Temple, which will occupy Ezekiel's attention in the last chapters of 40 –48.

Christianity believes that Ezekiel's Temple is more glorious than the Tabernacle of Moses (Exodus 25–40) and the Temple of Solomon (1 Kings 5–8), pointing forward to several beliefs:

- (1) the glory in which God dwells with man in the Messiah, John 1:14: "The Word became a human being and lived with us, and we saw his Sh'khinah" (שָׁכֵחַ Exodus 25:8) (CJB)
- (2) The Messiah's body is the Temple, John 2:19–21: "Yeshua answered them, 'Destroy this temple, and in three days I will raise it up again.' The Judeans said, 'It took 46 years to build this Temple, and you're going to raise it in three days?' But the 'temple' he had spoken of was his body." (CJB)
- (3) the messianic community as the Temple, 1 Corinthians 3:16: "Don't you know that you people are God's Temple and that God's Spirit lives in you?", Ephesians 2:20–22 "You have been built on the foundation of the emissaries and the prophets, with the cornerstone being Yeshua the Messiah himself. In union with him the whole building is held together, and it is growing into a holy temple in union with the Lord. Yes, in union with him, you yourselves are being built together into a spiritual dwelling-place for God!", 1 Peter 2:5 "...you yourselves, as living stones, are being built into a spiritual house to be cohanim set apart for God to offer spiritual sacrifices acceptable to him through Yeshua the Messiah." (CJB)
- (4) the body of the individual believer, 1 Corinthians 6:19: "Or don't you know that your body is a Temple for the Ruach HaKodesh who lives inside you, whom you received from God? The fact is, you don't belong to yourselves" (CJB)
- (5) the heavenly Jerusalem, Revelation 21:9-22:5

Judaism holds that the Messiah has not yet arrived namely because of the belief that the Messianic Age has not started yet. Jews believe that the Messiah will completely change life on earth and that pain and suffering will be conquered, thus initiating the Kingdom of God and the Messianic Age on earth. Christian belief varies, with one segment holding that the Kingdom of God is not worldly at all, while another believe that the Kingdom is both spiritual and will be of this world in a Messianic Age where Jesus will rule on the throne of David. Most Jews hold that the Kingdom of God will be on earth and the Messiah will occupy the throne of David. Christians (in particular Evangelicals) believe that it is both, and claim that it is spiritual (the historical Jesus completed salvation) and within right now, and physical and outward at the return of the Messiah (Second Coming of Jesus as "New Jerusalem, coming down out of heaven from God" Revelation 21:1–4).

While Christians have cited the above as prophecies referencing the life, status, and legacy of Jesus, Jewish scholars maintain that these passages are not messianic prophecies and are based on mistranslations or misunderstanding of the Hebrew texts.

=== Hosea 11:1 ===
When Israel was a child, I loved him, and out of Egypt I called my son.

In its original context, this text from Hosea referred to the deliverance of the people of Israel from bondage in Egypt. The Gospel of Matthew chapter 2 applies it to the return from Egypt of Jesus and his family as a messianic prophecy:

An angel of the Lord appeared to Joseph in a dream and said, "Rise, take the child and his mother, and flee to Egypt, and remain there till I tell you; for Herod is about to search for the child to destroy him." And he rose and took the child and his mother by night, and departed to Egypt, and remained there until the death of Herod. This was to fulfill what the Lord had spoken by the prophet, "Out of Egypt have I called my son"

— Matthew 2:13–15

=== Isaiah ===
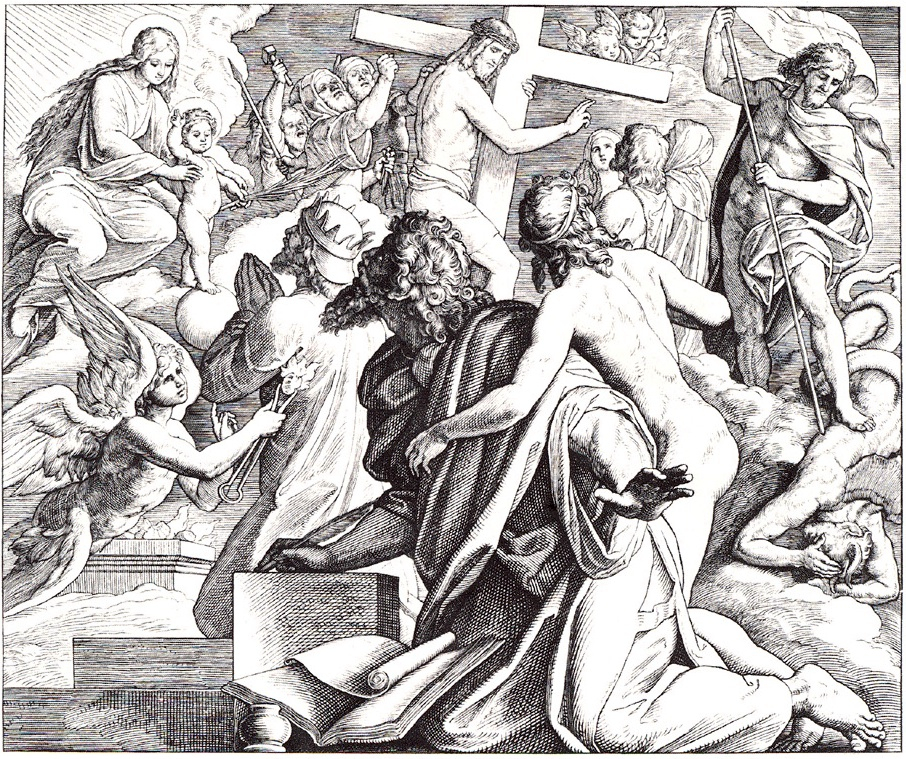
The Vision of Isaiah is depicted in this 1860 woodcut by Julius Schnorr von Karolsfeld

==== Isaiah 7:14 ====
Therefore the Lord himself shall give you a sign; Behold, the young woman shall conceive, and bear a son, and shall call his name Immanuel

Early Christian tradition interpreted this verse as a reference to the mother of Jesus. The prophet Isaiah, addressing king Ahaz of Judah, promises the king that God will destroy his enemies, and as a sign that his oracle is a true one he predicts that a "young woman" ("almah") standing nearby will shortly give birth to a child whose name will be Immanuel, "God is with us", and that the threat from the enemy kings will be ended before the child grows up. The almah might be the mother of Hezekiah or a daughter of Isaiah, although there are problems with both candidates – Hezekiah, for example, was apparently born nine years before the prophecy was given, – but the biblical chronology for Hezekiah is confused, and his identity as the prophesied child is strongly suggested by the reference to Immanuel's "land" in 8.8 and 10.

The Gospel of Matthew references this verse to support its claim of the supernatural origins of Jesus. In the time of Jesus, however, the Jews of Judea no longer spoke Hebrew, and Isaiah had to be translated into Greek and Aramaic, the two commonly used languages. In the Masoretic Text, the word almah means a young woman of childbearing age or who is a mother, but the Greek translation of Isaiah 7:14 rendered almah as parthenos, the Greek word for "virgin". Catholic scholar Brant Pitre argues that almah is close in meaning to the english word "maiden", meaning a young, unmarried woman, implied to be a virgin. Some conservative American Christians judge the acceptability of new Bible translations by the way they deal with Isaiah 7:14.

==== Isaiah 8:14 ====
And he shall be for a sanctuary; but for a stone of stumbling and for a rock of offence to both the houses of Israel, for a gin and for a snare to the inhabitants of Jerusalem. (KJV)

1 Peter 2:8 interprets the stone as Christ, quoting Isaiah 8:14 along with Psalm 118:22 and Isaiah 28:16, which mention a stone and a cornerstone.

==== Isaiah 8:22–9:1 (9:1–2) ====
Nevertheless, there will be no more gloom for those who were in distress. In the past he humbled the land of Zebulun and the land of Naphtali, but in the future he will honor Galilee of the nations, by the Way of the Sea, beyond the Jordan...

— ISA 8:23 (9:1)

According to both Jewish and Christian interpretation, the prophet Isaiah was commanded to inform the people of Israel in a prophecy that Sennacherib's plunder of the Ten Tribes was at hand, and that Nebuchadnezzar's spoil of Jerusalem, in later years, was coming nearer.

During the Syro-Ephraimite War, Isaiah opposed an alliance with Assyria, and counseled Ahaz to rely instead on the assurances of the Davidic covenant. This view was not well received at court. Assyria absorbed the lands of Zebulon and Naphtali to form the provinces of Galilee, Dor, and Gilead. Judah became a vassal kingdom of the Assyrians.

The reign of Hezekiah saw a notable increase in the power of the Judean state. Hezekiah was successful in his wars against the Philistines, driving them back in a series of victorious battles as far as Gaza. He thus not only retook all the cities that his father had lost, but even conquered others belonging to the Philistines. He also looked to attempting to reincorporate some of the desolate northern territories into the kingdom of Judah and thus restore the boundaries of the country as it was under David. At this time Judah was the strongest nation on the Assyrian-Egyptian frontier. The "messianic oracle" ("The people walking in darkness have seen a great light; Upon those living in the land of deep darkness a light has dawned.") may have coincided with the coronation of Hezekiah and looked toward the deliverance of the Israelites living in the northern provinces.

According to Jewish tradition, the salvation of which he speaks is the miraculous end of Sennacherib's siege of Jerusalem (see Isaiah 36 and 37) in the days of the Prince of Peace, King Hezekiah, a son of King Ahaz.

Matthew cites the messianic oracle, when Jesus began his ministry in Galilee:

And leaving Nazareth, He came and dwelt in Capernaum, which is by the sea, in the regions of Zebulun and Naphtali, that it might be fulfilled which was spoken by Isaiah the prophet, saying: "The land of Zebulun and the land of Naphtali, By the way of the sea, beyond the Jordan, Galilee of the Gentiles: The people who sat in darkness have seen a great light, And upon those who sat in the region and shadow of death Light has dawned."

— Matthew 4:12–16

The interpretation of Isaiah 9:1–2 by the author of the Gospel of Matthew has led Christian authors to hint at its messianic applications.

While the Gospel of Matthew modifies a Greek Septuagint interpretation of scripture (Isaiah 8:23–9:2), in the Masoretic Text it refers to the "region of the nations".

==== Isaiah 9:6,7 (Masoretic 9:5,6) ====
For a child has been born to us, a son given to us, and the authority is upon his shoulder, and the wondrous adviser, the mighty God, the everlasting Father, called his name, "the prince of peace."

— Isaiah 9:5 JPS

In Jewish translations of the Hebrew Bible the verse numbering is different (9:6 in the Christian Old Testament is numbered 9:5 in Hebrew Bible versions).

Newer Jewish versions do not translate the verse as follows:

- Isaiah 9:6 (Masoretic 9:5) "For a child is born unto us, a son hath been given unto us, and the government is placed on his shoulders; and his name is called, Wonderful, counsellor of the mighty God, of the everlasting Father, the prince of peace", (Lesser)
- Isaiah 9:6 (Masoretic 9:5) "For a child is born unto us, a son is given unto us; and the government is upon his shoulder; and his name is called Pele- joez-el-gibbor-Abi-ad-sar-shalom"; (JPS 1917)

This verse is expressly applied to the Messiah in the Targum, i.e. Aramaic commentary on the Hebrew Bible.

Some Christians believe that this verse refers to the birth of Jesus as the Messiah. The verse reads in Christian bible versions:

For a child will be born to us, a son will be given to us; And the government will rest on His shoulders; And His name will be called Wonderful, Counselor, The Mighty God, The Everlasting Father, The Prince of Peace.

— Isaiah 9:6

==== Isaiah 11:12 ====
And he shall set up a banner for the nations, and shall assemble the outcasts of Israel, and gather together the dispersed of Judah from the four corners of the earth.

— Isaiah 11:12

Some commentators view this as an unfulfilled prophecy, arguing that the Jewish people have not all been gathered in Israel. Some Christians refer to the foundation of the State of Israel as fulfillment of this prophecy. Others argue that the fulfillment is that Jesus as Messiah brings all nations to himself (cf. 11:10 "Nations will seek his counsel / And his abode will be honored.") citing John 12:32 ("And I, when I am lifted up from the earth, will draw all people to myself.") and Paul in Romans 15:12 when he quotes Isaiah 11:10, emphasizing the inclusion of the gentiles into the people of God.

Some Christians also believe that Isaiah 2:2 is to be understood in connection with Isaiah 11:10,12.

In the days to come, The Mount of the Lord's house Shall stand firm above the mountains And tower above the hills; And all the nations Shall gaze on it with joy.

— Isaiah 2:2

Some Christians believe that Jesus the Messiah is the ultimate "house" or dwelling place of God, as is told in John 1:14 ("And the Word became flesh and dwelt among us, and we have seen his glory") and 2:19–21 ("Jesus answered them, 'Destroy this temple, and in three days I will raise it up.' The Jews then said, 'It has taken forty-six years to build this temple, and will you raise it up in three days?' But he was speaking about the temple of his body."). Through him the messianic community becomes a temple in 1 Corinthians 3:16 ("Do you not know that you all are God's temple and that God's Spirit dwells in you?") and Ephesians 2:20–22 ("...built on the foundation of the apostles and prophets, the Messiah Jesus himself being the cornerstone, in whom the whole structure, being joined together, grows into a holy temple in the Lord. In him you also are being built together into a dwelling place for God by the Spirit."). It is through the Messiah's exaltation all nations are drawn to him, as in Luke 24:47 ("...and that repentance and forgiveness of sins should be proclaimed in his name to all nations, beginning from Jerusalem.").

The prophecy that the Lord Jesus would destroy and rebuild the Jerusalem temple/temple of His Body in three days is contained in the Old Testament, precisely in Hosea 6,1–2 and 2 Kings 20,8.

==== Isaiah 28:16 ====
Therefore thus saith the Lord God, Behold, I lay in Zion for a foundation a stone, a tried stone, a precious corner stone, a sure foundation: he that believeth shall not make haste. (KJV)

1 Peter 2:8 interprets the stone mentioned as Christ, quoting Isaiah 28:16 along with Psalm 118:22 and Isaiah 8:14 which mention a stone of stumbling and a cornerstone.

==== Isaiah 53:5 ====
But he was wounded for our transgressions, he was bruised for our iniquities: the chastisement of our peace was upon him, and with his stripes we are healed.

— Isaiah 53:5 (KJV)

But he was pained because of our transgressions, crushed because of our iniquities; the chastisement of our welfare was upon him, and with his wound we were healed.

— Isaiah 53:5 (JPS The Judaica Press Tanakh with Rashi's commentary

Isaiah 53 is probably the most famous example seen by Christians to be a messianic prophecy fulfilled by Jesus. It speaks of one known as the "suffering servant," who suffers because of the sins of others. Jesus is said to fulfill this prophecy through his death on the cross. The verse from Isaiah 53:5 has traditionally been understood by many Christians to speak of Jesus as the Messiah. The claim frequently advanced by Christian apologists is that the noted Jewish commentator, Rashi (1040 CE – 1105 CE), was the first to identify the suffering servant of Isaiah 53 with the nation of Israel; however, Origen mentions it in his work Contra Celsum, published about 800 years previously. Christians also note the implication that the nations would essentially be healed by making the Jewish nation suffer and the more they strike them, the more they are to be healed. However, many still view the "suffering servant" as a reference to the whole Jewish people, regarded as one individual, and more specifically to the Jewish people deported to Babylon. However, in aggadic midrash on the books of Samuel, a compendium of rabbinic folklore, historical anecdotes and moral exhortations, Isa 53:5 is messianically interpreted.

One of the first claims in the New Testament that Isaiah 53 is a prophecy of Jesus comes from the Book of Acts chapter 8 verses 26–36, which describes a scene in which God commands Philip the Apostle to approach an Ethiopian eunuch who is sitting in a chariot, reading aloud to himself from the Book of Isaiah. The eunuch comments that he does not understand what he is reading (Isaiah 53) and Philip explains to him that the passage refers to Jesus: "And the eunuch answered Philip, and said, I pray thee, of whom speaketh the prophet this? Of himself, or of some other man? Then Philip opened his mouth, and began at the same scripture, and preached unto him Jesus."

The (suffering) Servant, as referring to the Jewish people, suffering from the cruelties of the nations, is a theme in the Servant songs and is mentioned previously.

=== Jeremiah 31:15 ===
Thus saith the Lord; A voice was heard in Ramah, lamentation, and bitter weeping; Rachel weeping for her children refused to be comforted for her children, because they were not.

— Jeremiah 31:15 (KJV)

Matthew 2:17–18 gives the Massacre of the Innocents by Herod the Great as the fulfillment of a prophecy allegedly given by this verse in Jeremiah.

The phrase "because her children are no more" is believed to refer to the captivity of Rachel's children in Assyria. The subsequent verses describe their return to Israel.

=== Micah 5:2 (Micah 5:1 in Hebrew) ===
But thou, Beth-lehem Ephrathah, which art little to be among the thousands of Judah, out of thee shall one come forth unto Me that is to be ruler in Israel; whose goings forth are from of old, from ancient days. (Micah 5:1)

This verse near the end of Micah's prophecy on the Babylonian captivity has been interpreted by Christian apologists, and by Pharisees mentioned in the Gospel of John (John 7:42), as a prophecy that the Messiah would be born in Bethlehem.

The verse describes the clan of Bethlehem, who was the son of Caleb's second wife, Ephrathah. (1 Chr. 2:18, 2:50–52, 4:4) Bethlehem Ephrathah is the town and clan from which king David was born, and this passage refers to the future birth of a new Davidic heir.

Although the Gospel of Matthew and the Gospel of Luke give different accounts of the birth of Jesus, they both place the birth in Bethlehem. The Gospel of Matthew describes Herod the Great as asking the chief priests and scribes of Jerusalem where the Messiah was to be born. They respond by quoting Micah, "In Beit-Lechem of Y'hudah," they replied, "because the prophet wrote, 'And you, Beit-Lechem in the land of Y'hudah, are by no means the least among the rulers of Y'hudah; for from you will come a Ruler who will shepherd my people Isra'el.'" (Matthew 2:4–6)

The idea that Bethlehem was to be the birthplace of the Messiah appears in no Jewish source before the 4th century CE. Jewish tradition appears to have emphasised the idea that the birthplace of the Messiah was not known.

Some modern scholars consider the birth stories as inventions by the gospel writers, created to glorify Jesus and present his birth as the fulfillment of prophecy.

=== Psalms ===
Some portions of the Psalms are considered prophetic in Judaism, even though they are listed among the Ketuvim (Writings) and not the Nevi'im (Prophets).

The words Messiah and Christ mean "anointed one". In ancient times Jewish leaders were anointed with olive oil when they assumed their position (e.g. David, Saul, Isaac, Jacob). And Messiah is used as a name for kings in the Hebrew Bible: in 2 Samuel 1:14 David finds King Saul's killer and asks, "Why were you not afraid to lift your hand to destroy the LORD's anointed?"

In many Psalms, whose authorship are traditionally ascribed to King David (i.e. Messiah David), the author writes about his life in third person, referring to himself as "the/God's/your messiah" while clearly discussing his military exploits. Thus it can be argued that many of the portions that are asserted to be prophetic Psalms may not be.

==== Psalm 2 ====
Why do the nations conspire, and the peoples plot in vain? The kings of the earth set themselves, and the rulers take counsel together, against the LORD and his Anointed, saying, "Let us burst their bonds asunder, and cast their cords from us." He who sits in the heavens laughs; the LORD has them in derision. Then he will speak to them in his wrath, and terrify them in his fury, saying, "I have set my king on Zion, my holy hill." I will tell of the decree of the LORD: He said to me, "You are my son, today I have begotten you. Ask of me, and I will make the nations your heritage, and the ends of the earth your possession. You shall break them with a rod of iron, and dash them in pieces like a potter's vessel."

— Psalm 2: 1–9

Psalm 2 can be argued to be about David; the authors of Acts and the Epistle to the Hebrews interpreted it as relating to Jesus. Saint Augustine identifies "the nations [that] conspire, and the peoples [that] plot in vain" as the enemies referred to in Psalm 110: "Sit at my right hand, until I make your enemies your footstool."

Verse 7. The LORD is the messiah's father. In Judaism the phrase "Son of God" has very different connotations than in Christianity, not referring to literal descent but to the righteous who have become conscious of God's father of mankind.

Christians cite Herod and Pontius Pilate setting themselves against Jesus as evidence that Psalm 2 refers to him. Acts 13:33 interprets Jesus' rising from the dead as confirmation of verse 7 ("You are my son, today I have begotten you").

Hebrews 1:5 employs verse 7 in order to argue that Jesus is superior to the angels, i.e., Jesus is superior as a mediator between God and man. "For to what angel did God ever say, Thou art my Son, today I have begotten thee?" However, the phrase "son of God" appears in the Hebrew Bible to describe others than the coming Messiah, including David and Jacob.

Texts vary in the exact wording of the phrase beginning Psalm 2:12, with "kiss his foot", and "kiss the Son" being most common in various languages for centuries (including the King James Version), though not in original Hebrew Manuscripts such as the Dead Sea Scrolls. The proper noun was reduced to "son" in the Revised Version. The marginal interpretation accompanying the latter reads, "Worship in purity," which according to Joseph Hertz, "is in agreement with Jewish authorities."

==== Psalm 16 ====
I bless the Lord who has given me understanding, because even in the night, my heart warns me. I keep the Lord always within my sight; for he is at my right hand, I shall not be moved. For this reason my heart is glad and my soul rejoices; moreover, my body also will rest secure, for thou wilt not leave my soul in the abode of the dead, nor permit thy holy one to see corruption. Thou wilt show me the path of life, the fullness of joys in thy presence, and delights at thy right hand forever.

— Psalm 16:7–11

The interpretation of Psalm 16 as a messianic prophecy is common among Christian evangelical hermeneutics.

According to the preaching of Peter, this prophecy is about the messiah's triumph over death, i.e., the resurrection of Jesus.

God raised Jesus up, having loosed the pangs of death, because it was not possible for him to be held by it. For David says concerning him, "I saw the Lord always before me, for he is at my right hand that I may not be shaken... For thou wilt not abandon my soul to Hades, nor let thy Holy One see corruption... Thou wilt make me full of gladness with thy presence." Brethren, I may say to you confidently of the patriarch David that he both died and was buried, and his tomb is with us to this day. Being therefore a prophet, and knowing that God had sworn with an oath to him that he would set one of his descendants upon his throne, he foresaw and spoke of the resurrection of the Christ, that he was not abandoned to Hades, nor did his flesh see corruption. This Jesus God raised up, and we are all witnesses of it.

— Acts 2: 24–32

Also of note is what Paul said in the synagogue at Antioch. "And as for the fact that he raised him from the dead, no more to return to corruption, he spoke in this way, 'I will give you the holy and sure blessings of David.' Therefore, he also says in another psalm, 'Thou wilt not let thy Holy One see corruption.' For David, after he had served the counsel of God in his own generation, fell asleep, and saw corruption; but he whom God raised up saw no corruption" (Acts 13: 34–37).

==== Psalm 22 ====
1 My God, my God, why hast thou forsaken me? why art thou so far from helping me, and from the words of my roaring? 2 O my God, I cry in the day time, but thou hearest not; and in the night season, and am not silent. ... (KJV)

Two of the Gospels (Matthew 27:46 and Mark 15:34) quote Jesus as speaking these words of Psalm 22 from the cross;

And about three o'clock Jesus cried with a loud voice, "Eli, Eli, lema sabachthani?" that is, "My God, my God, why have you forsaken me?"

— Matthew 27:46

The other two canonical Gospels give different accounts of the words of Jesus. Luke 23:46 quotes Psalm 31:5 ("Into your hands I commit my spirit") while John has Jesus say "It is finished" (John 19:30). Some scholars see this as evidence that the words of Jesus were not part of a pre-Gospel Passion narrative, but were added later by the Gospel writers.

In most Hebrew manuscripts, such as the Masoretic, Psalm 22:16 (verse 17 in the Hebrew verse numbering) reads כארי ידי ורגלי ("like a lion my hands and my feet"). Many Modern English translations render this as "they have pierced my hands and my feet", starting with the Coverdale Bible which translated Luther's durchgraben (dig through, penetrate) as pearsed, with durchgraben being a variation of the Septuagint's ωρυξαν "dug". While this translation is highly controversial, it is asserted in Christian apologetics that the Dead Sea Scrolls lend weight to the translation as "They have pierced my hands and my feet", by lengthening the ending yud in the Hebrew word כארי (like a lion) into a vav כארו "Kaaru", which is not a word in the Hebrew language but when the aleph is omitted becomes כרו, dig, similar to the Septuagint translation. However, this view is contested considering the Nahal Hever scribe's other numerous misspellings, such as one in the very same sentence, where ידיה is written instead of the correct ידי, making the Hebrew word ידי yadai "hands" into ידיה yadehah, "her hands". Christian apologists argue that this passage refers to Jesus.

==== Psalm 34 ====
Many are the afflictions of the just man; but the Lord delivers him from all of them. He guards all his bones: not even one of them shall be broken.

— Psalms 34:20

Ray Pritchard has described Psalm 34:20 as a messianic prophecy. In its account of the crucifixion of Jesus, the Gospel of John interprets it as a prophecy (John 19:36) and presents some of the details as fulfillment.

So the soldiers came and broke the legs of the first, and of the other who had been crucified with Jesus; but when they came to Jesus and saw that he was already dead, they did not break his legs. But one of the soldiers pierced his side with a spear, and at once there came out blood and water... For these things took place that the scripture might be fulfilled, "Not a bone of him shall be broken." And again another scripture says, "They shall look on him whom they have pierced"

— John 19:32–37

==== Psalm 69 ====
They gave me also gall for my meat; and in my thirst they gave me vinegar to drink

— Psalm 69:21

Christians believe that this verse refers to Jesus' time on the cross in which he was given a sponge soaked in vinegar to drink, as seen in Matthew 27:34, Mark 15:23, and John 19:29.

==== Psalm 110 ====
The Lord said unto my Lord, Sit thou at my right hand, until I make thine enemies thy footstool. The Lord shall send the rod of thy strength out of Zion: rule thou in the midst of thine enemies. Thy people shall be willing in the day of thy power, in the beauties of holiness from the womb of the morning: thou hast the dew of thy youth. The Lord hath sworn, and will not repent, Thou art a priest for ever after the order of Melchizedek. The Lord at thy right hand shall strike through kings in the day of his wrath. He shall judge among the heathen, he shall fill the places with the dead bodies; he shall wound the heads over many countries. He shall drink of the brook in the way: therefore shall he lift up the head. (KJV)

Psalm 110 is viewed as messianic in both Jewish and Christian tradition, while also as eschatological sometimes in the latter. Christian authors have interpreted this psalm as a messianic passage in light of several New Testament passages. Pope Benedict XVI noted, "The royal glorification expressed at the beginning of the Psalm was adopted by the New Testament as a messianic prophecy. For this reason the verse is among those most frequently used by New Testament authors, either as an explicit quotation or as an allusion." He further connects this image to the concept of Christ the King.

In Acts 2:29–35, Peter refers to the similar glorification of Jesus in the context of the resurrection

The gospel writers interpret the psalm as a messianic prophecy:

while the Pharisees were gathered together, Jesus asked them a question, saying, "What do you think of the Christ? Whose son is he?" They said to him, "The son of David." He said to them, "How is it then that David in the Spirit calls him Lord, saying, The Lord said to my Lord: Sit at my right hand, till I put thy enemies under thy feet? If David thus calls him Lord, how is he his son?" And no one was able to answer him a word

— Matthew 22:41–46

According to Augustine of Hippo,: "It was necessary that all this should be prophesied, announced in advance. We needed to be told so that our minds might be prepared. He did not will to come so suddenly that we would shrink from him in fear; rather are we meant to expect him as the one in whom we have believed."

=== 2 Samuel 7:14 ===
I will be his father, and he shall be my son. If he commit iniquity, I will chasten him with the rod of men, and with the stripes of the children of men: (KJV)

Hebrews 1:5 quotes this verse as, "I will be his Father, and he will be my Son." In Samuel, the verse continues: "When he does wrong, I will punish him with the rod of men, with floggings inflicted by men." This is, however, not reflected in the comparable section in 1 Chronicles 17:13. The phrase as quoted in Hebrews is generally seen as a reference to the Davidic covenant, whereby God assures the king of his continued mercy to him and his descendants. It is in this context that Charles James Butler sees Psalm 41 as quoted by Jesus in John 13:18 as also messianic.

=== Wisdom 2:12–20 ===
The Wisdom of Solomon is one of the deuterocanonical books of the Old Testament. The Deuterocanonical books are considered canonical by Catholics, Eastern Orthodox and Oriental Orthodox, but are considered non-canonical by Jews and Protestants.

Let us lie in wait for the righteous man,

because he is inconvenient to us and opposes our actions;

he reproaches us for sins against the law,

and accuses us of sins against our training.

He professes to have knowledge of God,

and calls himself a child of the Lord.

He became to us a reproof of our thoughts;

the very sight of him is a burden to us,

because his manner of life is unlike that of others,

and his ways are strange.

We are considered by him as something base,

and he avoids our ways as unclean;

he calls the last end of the righteous happy,

and boasts that God is his father.

Let us see if his words are true,

and let us test what will happen at the end of his life;

for if the righteous man is God's son, he will help him,

and will deliver him from the hand of his adversaries.

Let us test him with insult and torture,

that we may find out how gentle he is,

and make trial of his forbearance.

Let us condemn him to a shameful death,

for, according to what he says, he will be protected.

— Wisdom 2:12–20

=== Zechariah ===
==== Zechariah 9:9 ====
Rejoice greatly, O daughter of Zion! Shout in triumph, O daughter of Jerusalem! Behold, your king is coming to you; He is just and endowed with salvation, Humble, and mounted on a donkey, Even on a colt, the foal of a donkey.

— Zechariah 9:9

Christian authors have interpreted Zechariah 9:9 as a prophecy of an act of messianic self-humiliation. The Gospel of John links this verse to the account of Jesus' entry into Jerusalem:

took the branches of the palm trees and went out to meet Him, and began to shout, "Hosanna! BLESSED IS HE WHO COMES IN THE NAME OF THE LORD, even the King of Israel." Jesus, finding a young donkey, sat on it; as it is written, "FEAR NOT, DAUGHTER OF ZION; BEHOLD, YOUR KING IS COMING, SEATED ON A DONKEY'S COLT."

— John 12:13–15

The Synoptic Gospels make clear that Jesus arranged this event, thus consciously fulfilling the prophecy.

The Gospel of Matthew describes Jesus' triumphant entry on Palm Sunday as a fulfillment of this verse in Zechariah. Matthew describes the prophecy in terms of a colt and a separate donkey, whereas the original only mentions the colt; the reference in Zechariah is a Jewish parallelism referring only to a single animal, and the gospels of Mark, Luke, and John state Jesus sent his disciples after only one animal. Several explanations have been suggested, such as that Matthew misread the original, the existence of the foal is implied, or he wanted to create a deliberate echo of a reference in 2 Samuel 16:1–4, where there are two asses for David's household to ride on.

In the most ancient Jewish writings Zechariah 9:9 is applied to the Messiah. According to the Talmud, so firm was the belief in the ass on which the Messiah is to ride that "if one sees an ass in a dream, he may hope for salvation". The verse is also Messianically quoted in Sanh. 98 a, in Pirqé de R. Eliez. c. 31, and in several of the Midrashim.

==== Zechariah 12:10 ====
And I will pour upon the house of David, and upon the inhabitants of Jerusalem, the spirit of grace and of supplication; and they shall look unto Me because they have thrust him through; and they shall mourn for him, as one mourneth for his only son, and shall be in bitterness for him, as one that is in bitterness for his first-born.

— Zechariah 12:10

Zechariah 12:10 is another verse commonly cited by Christian authors as a messianic prophecy fulfilled by Jesus.

In some of the most ancient Jewish writings, Zechariah 12:10 is applied to the Messiah Ben Joseph in the Talmud, and so is verse 12 ("The land will wail, each family by itself: The family of the House of David by themselves, and their women by themselves; the family of the House of Nathan by themselves, and their women by themselves"), there being, however, a difference of opinion whether the mourning is caused by the death of the Messiah Ben Joseph, or else on account of the evil concupiscence (Yetzer hara).

The Gospel of John makes reference to this prophecy when referring to the crucifixion of Jesus, as can be seen in the following account:

So the soldiers came, and broke the legs of the first man and of the other who was crucified with Him; but coming to Jesus, when they saw that He was already dead, they did not break His legs. But one of the soldiers pierced His side with a spear, and immediately blood and water came out. And he who has seen has testified, and his testimony is true; and he knows that he is telling the truth, so that you also may believe. For these things came to pass to fulfill the Scripture, "NOT A BONE OF HIM SHALL BE BROKEN." And again another Scripture says, "THEY SHALL LOOK ON HIM WHOM THEY PIERCED."

— John 19:32–37

Zechariah 12:10 is often regarded as mistranslated by modern-day adherents to Judaism. It is often translated by Jews as follows:

And I will pour out upon the house of David and upon the inhabitants of Jerusalem a spirit of grace and supplications. And they shall look to me because of those who have been thrust through [with swords], and they shall mourn over it as one mourns over an only son and shall be in bitterness, therefore, as one is embittered over a firstborn son.

The Jewish-Christian debate on the correct rendering of Zechariah 12:10 oftentimes come down to the translation of the Hebrew phrase "את אשר ('êṯ-'ă·šer or et-asher)" which can mean either "whom" or "about" depending on the context.

== Debate about prophecy fulfillment ==
Among Christian believers, opinion varies as to which Old Testament passages are messianic prophecies and which are not, and whether the prophecies they claim to have been fulfilled are intended to be prophecies. The authors of these Old Testament prophecies often appear to be describing events that had already occurred. For example, the New Testament verse states:

So he got up, took the child and his mother during the night and left for Egypt, 15 where he stayed until the death of Herod. And so was fulfilled what the Lord had said through the prophet: 'Out of Egypt I called my son.

— Matthew 2:14

This is referring to the Old Testament verse Hosea 11:1. However, that passage reads,

When Israel was a child, I loved him, and out of Egypt I called my son.

Skeptics say that the Hosea passage clearly is talking about a historical event and therefore the passage clearly is not a prophecy.

According to modern scholarship, the suffering servant described in Isaiah chapter 53 is actually the Jewish people in its original context. According to some, the rabbinic response, e.g., Rashi and Maimonides, is that, although the suffering servant passage is clearly prophetic and even if Psalm 22 is prophetic, the Messiah has not come yet; therefore, the passages could not be talking about Jesus. As noted above, there is some controversy about the phrase "they have pierced my hands and my feet".

For modern Bible scholars, either the verses make no claim of predicting future events, or the verses make no claim of speaking about the Messiah. They view the argument that Jesus is the Messiah because he has fulfilled prophecy as a fallacy, i.e. it is a confession of faith masquerading as objective rational argumentation. As Christian-turned-atheist Farrell Till argues in his Skeptical Review,

What is the rationale for distorting the scriptures so flagrantly? Well, the answer, of course, is obvious: the gospel writers were desperate to prove that their man Jesus was the Messiah who had been promised in the Old Testament. Since there really were no prophecies of a virgin-born, crucified, resurrected Messiah in the Old Testament, they had to twist and distort to give the appearance that Jesus was the long-awaited one.

A number of Christian scholars, however, present a different approach. Developed by Walter C. Kaiser and popularised by Raymond E. Brown, the Latin phrase sensus plenior has been used in biblical exegesis to describe the supposed deeper meaning intended by God but not by the human author.

Brown defines sensus plenior as

That additional, deeper meaning, intended by God but not clearly intended by the human author, which is seen to exist in the words of a biblical text (or group of texts, or even a whole book) when they are studied in the light of further revelation or development in the understanding of revelation.

Richard Hays explains

There is consequently a significant difference between prediction and prefiguration. Figural reading need not presume that the OT authors- or the characters they narrate- were conscious of predicting or anticipating Christ. Rather, the discernment of a figural correspondence is necessarily retrospective rather than prospective. (Another way to put this point is that figural reading is a form of intertextual interpretation that focuses on an intertextuality of reception rather than of production.) The act of retrospective recognition is the intellectus spiritualis. Because the two poles of a figure are events within "the flowing stream" of time, the correspondence can be discerned only after the second event has occurred and imparted a new pattern of significance to the first. But once the pattern of correspondence has been grasped, the semantic force of the figure flows both ways, as the second event receives deeper significance from the first.

John Goldingay suggests that the citation of Isaiah 7:14 in Matthew 1:23 is a "stock example" of sensus plenior. In this view, the life and ministry of Jesus is considered the revelation of these deeper meanings, such as with Isaiah 53, regardless of the original context of passages quoted in the New Testament. Nonetheless, as indicated by conservative scholar Craig A. Evans, Isaiah 7:14 is not actually about the birth of an awaited messiah, and the prophecy was not intended to be fulfilled seven centuries later, but was already so in the lifetime of King Ahaz.

== See also ==
- Bible prophecy
- Biblical hermeneutics
- Christianity and Judaism
- Christian views on the Old Covenant
- Exegesis
- Jesus in Christianity
- Judaism's view of Jesus
- Messiah in Judaism
- Muhammad and the Bible
- New Covenant
- Shiloh (biblical figure)
- Supersessionism
- Unfulfilled Christian religious predictions
