= Servant songs =

Four songs in the Book of Isaiah

The servant songs (also called the servant poems or the Songs of the Suffering Servant) are four songs in the Book of Isaiah in the Hebrew Bible, which include Isaiah 42:1–4; Isaiah 49:1–6; Isaiah 50:4–11; and Isaiah 52:13–53:12. The songs are four poems written about a certain "servant of YHWH" (Hebrew: עבד יהוה, ‘eḇeḏ Yahweh). Yahweh calls the servant to lead the nations, but the servant is horribly abused by them. In the end, he is rewarded.

Some scholars regard Isaiah 61:1–3 as a fifth servant song, although the word "servant" (Hebrew: עבד, ‘eḇeḏ) is not mentioned in the passage. This fifth song is largely disregarded by modern scholars; without it, all four fall within Deutero-Isaiah, the middle part of the book, which some believe to be the work of an anonymous 6th-century BCE author writing during the Babylonian Exile. The five songs were first identified by Bernhard Duhm in his 1892 commentary on Isaiah.

== Jewish interpretation ==
The Self-Glorification Hymn from Dead Sea Scrolls asserts, from the first-person narrative, a messianic human who has been exalted into heaven with a status above the angels. This figure rhetorically asks "Who bears all griefs as I do? And who suffers evil like me? Who has been despised on my account?" to imply that he has been despised unlike anyone before, modelling himself on the suffering servant from Isaiah's servant songs.

Rabbinic Judaism sees this passage, especially "God's Suffering Servant" as a reference to the Jewish nation, not to the king Mashiach. Jewish teaching also takes note of the historical context in which God's Suffering Servant appears, particularly because it speaks in the past tense. They argue that the Jewish nation has borne unspeakable injustices, under Assyria, Babylonia, Ancient Greece, ancient Rome, and bears persecution to this day.

=== Hebrew Bible ===
Jewish scripture in Isaiah speaks in the light, when it says:

"But thou, Israel, My servant..." (Isaiah 41:8)
"Ye are My witnesses, saith the LORD, and My servant whom I have chosen..." (Isaiah 43:10)
"By oppression and judgment he was taken away, and with his generation who did reason? for he was cut off out of the land of the living, for the transgression of my people to whom the stroke was due..." (Isaiah 53:8)
"Of the travail of his soul he shall see to the full, even My servant..." (Isaiah 53:11)

See also Ramban in his disputation.

=== Talmud ===
- "The Messiah --what is his name?...The Rabbis say, The Leper Scholar, as it is said, 'surely he has borne our griefs and carried our sorrows: yet we did esteem him a leper, smitten of God and afflicted...'"–Babylonian Talmud: (Sanhedrin 98b)
- "Another explanation (of Ruth ii.14): -- He is speaking of king Messiah; 'Come hither,' draw near to the throne; 'and eat of the bread,' that is, the bread of the kingdom; 'and dip thy morsel in the vinegar,' this refers to his chastisements, as it is said, 'But he was wounded for our transgressions, bruised for our iniquities'".–Midrash Ruth Rabbah

=== Modern Judaism ===
The modern Jewish interpretation of Isaiah 52:13 through Isaiah 53:12 describes the servant of the LORD as the Nation of Israel itself: "My servant..." (Isaiah 53:11), "... a man of pains and accustomed to illness ... " (Isaiah 53:3). "The theme of Isaiah is jubilation, a song of celebration at the imminent end of the Babylonian Captivity".

== Christian interpretation ==
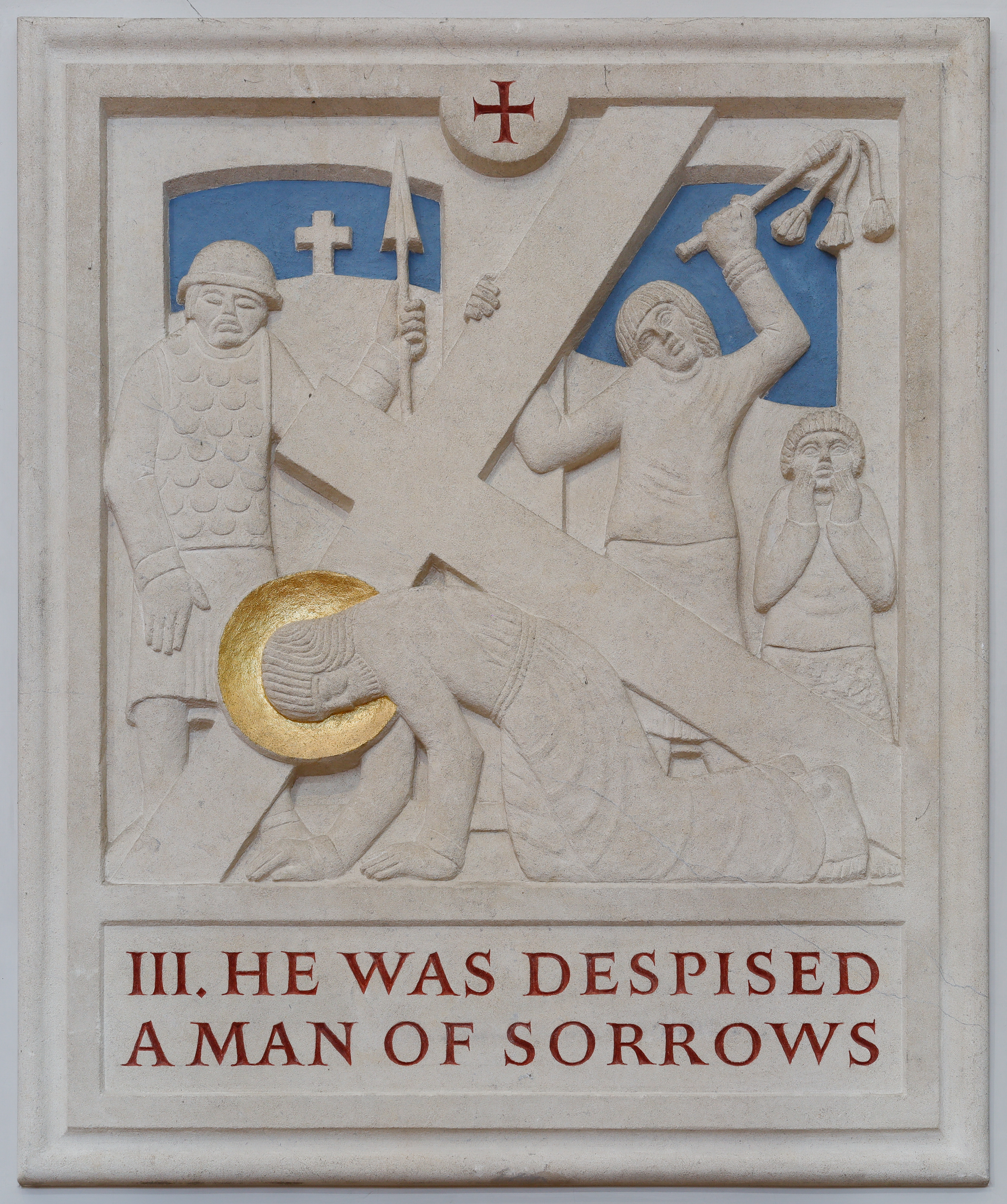
Carving from the Way of the Cross in St. Mel's Cathedral, Ireland

Christians traditionally see the servant as Jesus Christ. The songs are quoted to and applied to Jesus multiple times in the New Testament, as described in following sections. Another Christian interpretation combines aspects of the traditional Christian and the Jewish interpretation. This position sees the servant as an example of 'corporate personality', where an individual can represent a group, and vice versa. Thus, in this case, the servant corresponds to Israel, yet at the same time corresponds to an individual (that is, the Messiah) who represents Israel.

=== The first song ===
The first poem has God speaking of his selection of the servant who will bring justice to earth. Here the servant is described as God's agent of justice, a king who brings justice in both royal and prophetic roles, yet justice is established neither by proclamation nor by force. He does not ecstatically announce salvation in the marketplace as prophets were bound to do, but instead moves quietly and confidently to establish right religion (Isaiah 42:1-4).

The first four verses are quoted in Matthew's gospel, where it is said that the prophecy is fulfilled in Jesus' withdrawal from the cities of Galilee and his request that the crowds do not make him known.

=== The second song ===
The second poem, written from the servant's point of view, is an account of his prenatal calling by God to lead both Israel and the nations. The servant is now portrayed as the prophet of the Lord equipped and called to restore the nation to God. Yet, anticipating the fourth song, he is without success. Taken with the picture of the servant in the first song, his success will come not by political or military action, but by becoming a light to the gentiles. Ultimately his victory is in God's hands. Isaiah 49:1-6. Isaiah 49:6 is quoted by Simeon in Luke 2:32 concerning the infant Jesus Christ during the time of His mother Mary's purification.

=== The third song ===
The third poem (Isaiah 50:4-9) has a darker yet more confident tone than the others. Although the song gives a first-person description of how the servant was beaten and abused, here the servant is described both as teacher and learner who follows the path God places him on without pulling back. Echoing the first song's "a bruised reed he will not break", he sustains the weary with a word. His vindication is left in God's hands. The song is seen by New Testament commentators as a Messianic prophecy of Jesus Christ.

Verse 6 is quoted in Handel's "Messiah", and there is an allusion in Luke 9:51 to verse 7 ("Therefore I have set my face like a flint"), as Jesus "set his face steadfastly" to go to Jerusalem.

=== The fourth song ===
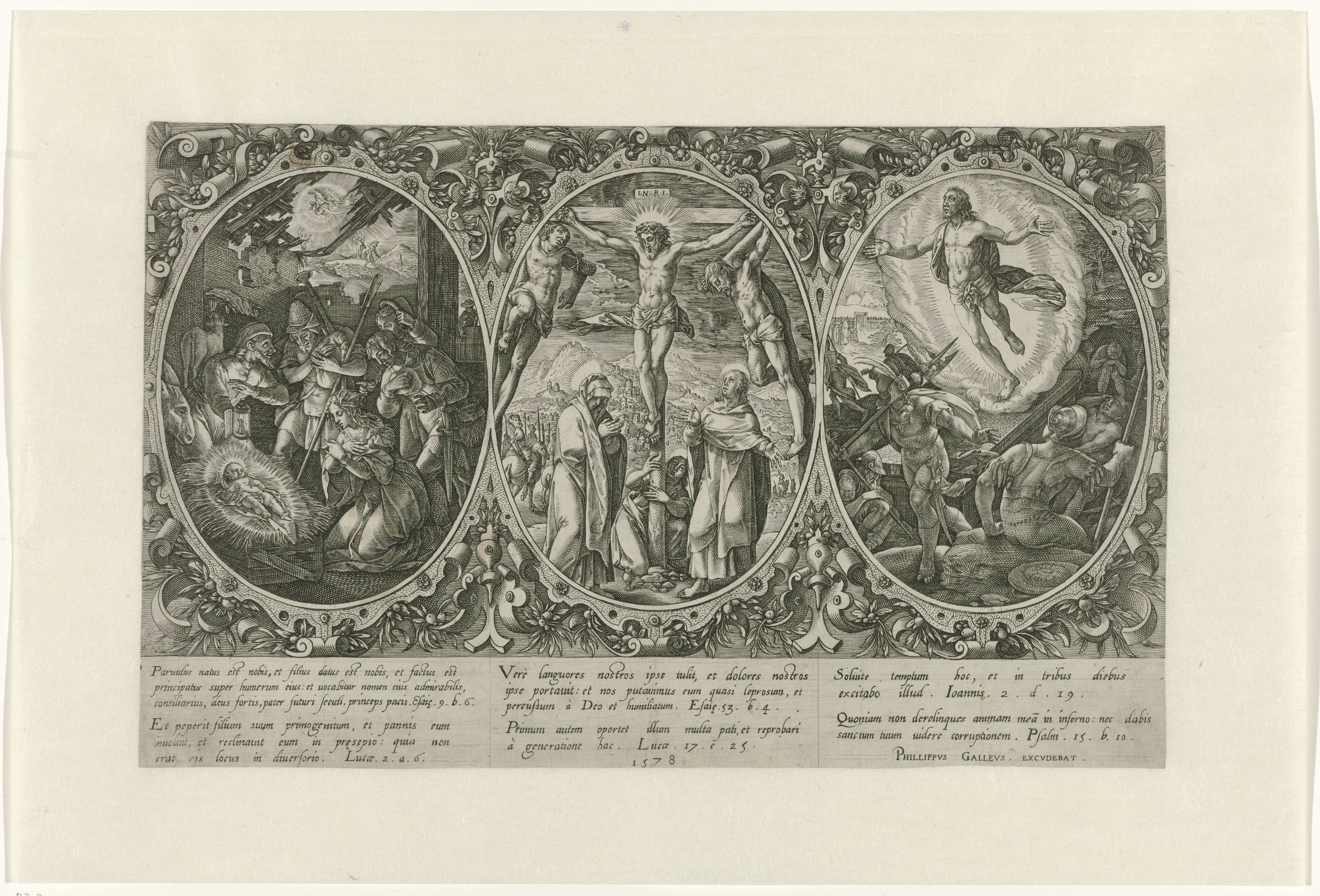
16th-century Dutch engraving of the Nativity, Crucifixion and Resurrection of Jesus; under the Crucifixion image is a quotation from the servant song in Latin translation: Vere languores nostros ipse tulit et dolores nostros ipse portavit et nos putavimus eum quasi leprosum et percussum a Deo et humiliatum (NIV: "Surely he took up our pain and bore our suffering, yet we considered him punished by God, stricken by him, and afflicted.")

The fourth of the servant songs begins at Isaiah 52:13, continuing through 53:12 where it continues the discussion of the suffering servant.

Christians consider this song to be clearly a messianic prophecy of Jesus as do the gospels themselves. Jesus quoted one sentence in Isaiah 53:12 of this fourth servant song as referring to himself in Luke 22:37, and the New Testament cites it as referring to Jesus Christ in Matthew 8:17, Mark 15:28, John 12:38, Acts 8:32–33, Romans 10:16, 15:21 and 1 Peter 2:22. Methodist founder John Wesley suggested that it is "so evident" that "it is Christ who is here spoken of".

The Servant has moved from being a king in the first song to being someone who is bearing, and being punished, for the sins of others. Christians understand this as referring to the whole of humanity, as is shown in 1 Peter 2:22–25, Romans 5:5–8, Hebrews 9 and elsewhere. He has no descendants (53:8), was killed (53:8,9). Posthumously, then, the Servant is vindicated by God (53:10-12), with an allusion to resurrection (53:11,12).
