= John Goldingay =

British scholar and cleric

The Reverend John Goldingay
- Born: John Edgar Goldingay; 20 June 1942 (age 84); Birmingham, West Midlands, England
- Occupations: Scholar, Anglican cleric
- Spouses: Ann (m. 1966; died 2009) Kathleen (m. 2010)
- Children: 2
- Awards: Doctor of Divinity Lambeth degree

Academic background
- Education: University of Oxford
- Alma mater: University of Nottingham

Academic work
- Discipline: Biblical studies
- Sub-discipline: Old Testament studies
- Institutions: St John's College, Nottingham; Fuller Theological Seminary; St Barnabas Episcopal Church, Pasadena
- Main interests: Old Testament and Hebrew
- Website: http://johnandkathleenshow.com

John Edgar Goldingay (born 20 June 1942) is a British Old Testament scholar and translator and Anglican cleric. He is the David Allan Hubbard Professor Emeritus of Old Testament in the School of Theology of Fuller Theological Seminary in California.

== Education and career ==
Goldingay obtained a Bachelor of Arts (BA) at the University of Oxford and a Doctor of Philosophy (PhD) at the University of Nottingham. He also has a Doctor of Divinity Lambeth degree. He was ordained a deacon in the Church of England in 1966 and a priest in 1967.

Goldingay was a Professor of Old Testament and Hebrew at St John's College, Nottingham and served as Principal from 1988 to 1997. He went to Fuller Theological Seminary in 1997. He was also an associate priest at St Barnabas Episcopal Church, Pasadena.

== Personal life ==
Goldingay was married to his first wife, Ann, for 43 years until she died in June 2009. In 2010 he married Kathleen Scott. He has two adult sons from his first marriage and an adult step-daughter from the second. After retiring from Fuller, he moved back to his home country of England in the spring of 2018, living in Oxford.

== Writing career ==
Goldingay has published major commentaries on several books of the Old Testament as well as books on Old Testament theology and biblical interpretation. From 2010 to 2016, he issued the Old Testament for Everyone series through Westminster John Knox Press, a study guide for laypeople with original translation and study notes for each book of the Protestant Old Testament canon. In 2018, his complete translation of the Old Testament was released by InterVarsity Press under the title The First Testament.

== Selected works ==
=== Books ===
- Goldingay, John (1989). Daniel. Word Biblical Commentary. Vol. 30. Waco, Texas: Thomas Nelson. ISBN 978-0-8499-0229-1.
- ——— (1994). Models for Scripture. Jacksonville, Florida: Clements Publishing. ISBN 978-1-8946-6741-8.
- ——— (1995). Models for the Interpretation of Scripture (Reissue ed.). Jacksonville, FL: Clements Publishing. ISBN 978-1-8946-6740-1.
- ——— (1995). Isaiah. Understanding the Bible Commentary Series. Vol. 13 (Reissue ed.). Grand Rapids, Michigan: Baker Academic. ISBN 978-0-8010-4638-4.
- ——— (1996). After Eating the Apricot. Inside out Meditation. Vol. 1. Solway. ISBN 9781900507028.
- ——— (1998). To the Usual Suspects. Paternoster Press. ISBN 978-0-8536-4927-4.
- ——— (2000). Men Behaving Badly. Paternoster Press. ISBN 978-1-8422-7012-7.
- ——— (2002). Walk On: Life, Loss, Trust, and Other Realities (Revised ed.). Grand Rapids, MI: Baker Academic. ISBN 978-0-8010-2465-8.
- ——— (2003). Old Testament Theology: Volume 1: Israel's Gospel. Downers Grove, Illinois: IVP Academic. ISBN 978-0-8308-2561-5.
- ——— (2006). Old Testament Theology: Volume 2: Israel's Faith. Downers Grove, IL: IVP Academic. ISBN 978-0-8308-2562-2.
- ——— (2006). Psalms, Volume 1: Psalms 1–41. Baker Commentary on the Old Testament: Wisdom and Psalms. Grand Rapids, MI: Baker Academic. ISBN 978-0-8010-2703-1.
- ——— (2007). Psalms, Volume 2: Psalms 42–89. Baker Commentary on the Old Testament: Wisdom and Psalms. Grand Rapids, MI: Baker Academic. ISBN 978-0-8010-2704-8.
- ——— (2008). Psalms, Volume 3: Psalms 90-150. Baker Commentary on the Old Testament: Wisdom and Psalms. Grand Rapids, MI: Baker Academic. ISBN 978-0-8010-3143-4.
- ——— (2009). Old Testament Theology: Volume 3: Israel's Life. Downers Grove, IL: IVP Academic. ISBN 978-0-8308-2563-9.
- ——— (2010). Genesis for Everyone: Part 1: Chapters 1-16. Old Testament for Everyone. Louisville, Kentucky: Westminster John Knox Press. ISBN 978-0-6642-3374-7.
- ——— (2010). Genesis for Everyone: Part 2: Chapters 17-50. Old Testament for Everyone. Louisville, KY: Westminster John Knox Press. ISBN 978-0-6642-3375-4.
- ——— (2010). Key Questions about Christian Faith: Old Testament Answers. Grand Rapids, MI: Baker Academic. ISBN 978-0-8010-3954-6.
- ——— (2011). Key Questions about Biblical Interpretation: Old Testament Answers. Grand Rapids, MI: Baker Academic. ISBN 978-0-8010-3959-1.
- ——— (2011). 1 and 2 Samuel for Everyone. Old Testament for Everyone. Louisville, KY: Westminster John Knox Press. ISBN 978-0-6642-3379-2.
- ——— (2011). 1 and 2 Kings for Everyone. Old Testament for Everyone. Louisville, KY: Westminster John Knox Press. ISBN 978-0-6642-3380-8.
- ——— (2012). 1 and 2 Chronicles for Everyone. Old Testament for Everyone. Louisville, KY: Westminster John Knox Press. ISBN 978-0-6642-3381-5.
- ——— (2013). Psalms for Everyone: Part 1: Psalms 1-72. Old Testament for Everyone. Louisville, KY: Westminster John Knox Press. ISBN 978-0-6642-3383-9.
- ——— (2014). Psalms for Everyone: Part 2: Psalms 73-150. Old Testament for Everyone. Louisville, KY: Westminster John Knox Press. ISBN 978-0-6642-3384-6.
- ——— (2014). The Theology of the Book of Isaiah. Downers Grove, IL: IVP Academic. ISBN 978-0-8308-4039-7.
- ——— (2015). An Introduction to the Old Testament: Exploring Text, Approaches & Issues. Downers Grove, IL: IVP Academic. ISBN 978-0-8308-4090-8.
- ——— (2015). Isaiah for Everyone. Old Testament for Everyone. Louisville, KY: Westminster John Knox Press. ISBN 978-0-6642-3386-0.
- ——— (2016). Daniel and the Twelve Prophets for Everyone. Old Testament for Everyone. Louisville, KY: Westminster John Knox Press. ISBN 978-0-664-23390-7.
- ——— (2021). The Book of Jeremiah. The New International Commentary on the Old Testament. Grand Rapids, MI: Eerdmans. ISBN 978-0-8028-7584-6.
- ——— (2022). The Book of Lamentations. The New International Commentary on the Old Testament. Grand Rapids, MI: Eerdmans. ISBN 978-0-8028-2542-1.
- ——— (2023). Joshua. Baker Commentary on the Old Testament: Historical Books. Grand Rapids, MI: Baker Academic. ISBN 978-1540964618.

=== Articles ===
- ——— (1975). "The Study of Old Testament Theology: Its Aims and Purpose". Tyndale Bulletin. 26: 34–52.
- ——— (1978). "Repetition and Variation in the Psalms". Jewish Quarterly Review. 68 (3): 146–57. doi:10.2307/1454290. JSTOR 1454290.
- ——— (1981). "The Dynamic Cycle of Praise and Prayer in the Psalms". Journal for the Study of the Old Testament. 20: 85–90.
- ——— (2013). "Do We Need the New Testament?". Stone-Campbell Journal. 16: 235–248.
- ———; Goldingay, Kathleen Scott (2015). "The Sting in the Psalms, Part 2". Theology. 118: 3–9. doi:10.1177/0040571X14551690. S2CID 170917441.
- ———; Goldingay, Kathleen Scott (2014). "The Sting in the Psalms, Part 1". Theology. 117 (6): 403–410. doi:10.1177/0040571X14547472. S2CID 171569907.
- ———; LeMarquand, Grant; Sumner, George R.; Westberg, Daniel (2011). "The Traditionalist Response". Anglican Theological Review. 93: 89–100.
- ———; LeMarquand, Grant; Sumner, George R.; Westberg, Daniel (2011). "Same-Sex Marriage and Anglican Theology: A View from the Traditionalists". Anglican Theological Review. 93: 1–50.
- ——— (2013). "On Reading Job 22-28". Expository Times. 124 (10): 480–484. doi:10.1177/0014524613482626. S2CID 147637202.
- ——— (2008). "Isaiah 53 in the Pulpit". Perspectives in Religious Studies. 35: 147–153.
- ——— (2008). "Old Testament Theology and the Canon". Tyndale Bulletin. 59: 1–26.
- ——— (2008). "The God of Grace and Truth". Journal of Theological Interpretation. 2: 7–11.
- ——— (2016). "Isaiah Then and Now: Reflections on the Responses to The Theology of the Book of Isaiah". Journal of Pentecostal Theology. 25: 30–42. doi:10.1163/17455251-02501007.
- ——— (2006). "Psalm 4: Ambiguity and Resolution". Tyndale Bulletin. 57: 161–172.
- ——— (2000). "The Significance of Circumcision". Journal for the Study of the Old Testament. 25 (88): 3–18. doi:10.1177/030908920002508801. S2CID 170880955.
- ——— (1999). "The Compound Name in Isaiah 9:5(6)". Catholic Biblical Quarterly. 61: 239–244.
- ——— (1998). "Isaiah I 1 and II 1". Vetus Testamentum. 48 (3): 326–332. doi:10.1163/1568533982722441.
- ——— (1998). "Isaiah 43,22-28". Zeitschrift für die alttestamentliche Wissenschaft. 110: 173–191.
- ——— (1997). "Isaiah 40-55 in the 1990s: Among Other Things, Deconstructing, Mystifying, Intertextual, Socio-Critical, and Hearer-Involving". Biblical Interpretation. 5 (3): 225–246. doi:10.1163/156851597X00274.
- ——— (1996). "What Happens to Ms Babylon in Isaiah 47, Why, and Who Says So". Tyndale Bulletin. 47: 215–243.
- ——— (1996). "Was the Holy Spirit Active in Old Testament Times? What Was New About the Christian Experience of God". Ex Auditu. 12: 14–28.
- ——— (1995). "Isaiah 42.18-25". Journal for the Study of the Old Testament. 20 (67): 43–65. doi:10.1177/030908929502006703. S2CID 170175083.
- ——— (1995). "Hosea 1-3, Genesis 1-4, and Masculinist Interpretation". Horizons in Biblical Theology. 17: 37–44. doi:10.1163/187122095X00032.
- ——— (1994). "The Arrangement of Sayings in Proverbs 10-15". Journal for the Study of the Old Testament. 19 (61): 75–83. doi:10.1177/030908929401906106. S2CID 170381288.
- ——— (1993). "Kayyôm hazzeh 'on this very day', kayyôm 'on the very day', kāʻēt 'at the very time'". Vetus Testamentum. 43: 112–115.
- ——— (1993). "How Far Do Readers Make Sense? Interpreting Biblical Narrative". Themelios. 18: 5–10.
- ——— (2016). "And Finally... Translating the Old Testament". Expository Times. 128: 52. doi:10.1177/0014524616653290. S2CID 171132612.
- ——— (2002). "Jubilee Tithe". Transformation. 19 (3): 198–205. doi:10.1177/026537880201900305. S2CID 220710877.
- ——— (2001). "What Are the Characteristics of Evangelical Study of the Old Testament". Evangelical Quarterly. 73 (2): 99–117. doi:10.1163/27725472-07302002.
- ——— (1999). "Old Testament Prophecy and Futures Studies". Theology. 102 (810): 416–423. doi:10.1177/0040571X9910200604. S2CID 170848497.
- ——— (1999). "Eli: The Man for Whom It Was Too Late". Anvil. 16: 165–172.
- ——— (1998). "The Logic of Intercession". Theology. 101 (802): 262–270. doi:10.1177/0040571X9810100404. S2CID 170781105.
- ——— (1998). "The Ongoing Story of Biblical Interpretation". Churchman. 112: 6–16.
- ——— (1997). "Are They Comic Acts". Evangelical Quarterly. 69 (2): 99–107. doi:10.1163/27725472-06902002. S2CID 252286654.
- ——— (1997). "In Preaching Be Scriptural... and Therefore Be Experiential, Be Oral, Be Interesting, and Be Imaginative". Anvil. 14: 87–94.
- ——— (1997). "Biblical Story and the Way It Shapes Our Story". Journal for the European Pentecostal Theological Association. 17: 5–15. doi:10.1179/jep.1997.17.1.002.
- ——— (1996). "Charismatic Spirituality". Theology. 99: 178–187. doi:10.1177/0040571X9609900302. S2CID 170797739.
- ——— (1995). "Motherhood, Machismo, and the Purpose of Yahweh in Judges 4-5". Anvil. 12: 21–33.
- ——— (1991). "Modes of Theological Reflection in the Bible". Theology. 94 (759): 181–188. doi:10.1177/0040571X9109400305. S2CID 170678485.
- ——— (1991). "Models for Scripture". Scottish Journal of Theology. 44: 19–37. doi:10.1017/S0036930600025217. S2CID 170877872.
- ——— (1982). "The Hermeneutics of Liberation Theology". Horizons in Biblical Theology. 4–5: 133–161.
- ——— (1983). "The Old Testament and Christian Faith: Jesus and the Old Testament in Matthew 1-5". Themelios. 8: 1–12.
- ——— (1979). "The Arrangement of Isaiah 41-45". Vetus Testamentum. 29: 289–299. doi:10.1163/156853379X00292.
- ——— (1987). "The Stories in Daniel: A Narrative Politics". Journal for the Study of the Old Testament. 12 (37): 99–116. doi:10.1177/030908928701203706. S2CID 143030316.
- ——— (1972). "That You May Know That Yahweh Is God: A Study in the Relationship between Theology and Historical Truth in the Old Testament". Tyndale Bulletin. 23: 58–93.
- ——— (1984). "Diversity and Unity in Old Testament Theology". Vetus Testamentum. 34: 153–168.
