= Isaiah 46 =

Book of Isaiah chapter 46

- ← chapter 45 chapter 47 →
- The Great Isaiah Scroll, the best preserved of the biblical scrolls found at Qumran from the second century BC, contains all the verses in this chapter.
- Book: Book of Isaiah
- Hebrew Bible part: Nevi'im
- Order in the Hebrew part: 5
- Category: Latter Prophets
- Christian Bible part: Old Testament
- Order in the Christian part: 23

Isaiah 46 is the forty-sixth chapter of the Book of Isaiah in the Hebrew Bible or the Old Testament of the Christian Bible. This book contains the prophecies attributed to the prophet Isaiah and is a part of the Nevi'im (books of the Prophets). Isaiah 40–55 is known as "Deutero-Isaiah" (or "Second Isaiah") and dates from the time of the Israelites' exile in Babylon.

== Text ==
The original text was written in Biblical Hebrew. The chapter is divided into 13 verses.

=== Textual witnesses ===
Some early manuscripts containing the text of this chapter in Hebrew are of the Masoretic Text tradition, which includes the Codex Cairensis (895), the Petersburg Codex of the Prophets (916), Aleppo Codex (10th century), Codex Leningradensis (1008).

Fragments containing parts of this chapter were found among the Dead Sea Scrolls (3rd century BC or later):

- 1QIsa^{a}: complete
- 1QIsa^{b}: extant: verses 3‑13
- 4QIsa^{b} (4Q56): extant: verses 1–3
- 4QIsa^{d} (4Q58): extant: verses 10‑13

There is also a translation into Koine Greek known as the Septuagint, made in the last few centuries BCE. Extant ancient manuscripts of the Septuagint version include Codex Vaticanus (B; $\mathfrak{G}$^{B}; 4th century), Codex Sinaiticus (S; BHK: $\mathfrak{G}$^{S}; 4th century), Codex Alexandrinus (A; $\mathfrak{G}$^{A}; 5th century) and Codex Marchalianus (Q; $\mathfrak{G}$^{Q}; 6th century).

== Parashot ==
The parashah (weekly Torah portion) sections listed here are based on the Aleppo Codex. Isaiah 46 is a part of the Consolations (Isaiah 40–66). {P}: open parashah; {S}: closed parashah.

[{P} 45:18-25] 46:1-2 {P} 46:3-4 {S} 46:5-7 {S} 46:8-11 {S} 46:12-13 {S}

== Structure ==
The Jerusalem Bible organises this chapter as follows:

- Isaiah 46:1-4 = The fall of Bel
- Isaiah 46:5-7 = Yahweh is without equal
- Isaiah 46:8-13 = Yahweh is lord of the future

There are no subdivisions in the New King James Version, where the chapter is sub-titled "Dead Idols and the Living God", or the New International Version, where the chapter is sub-titled "Gods of Babylon".

== Verse 1 ==
Bel boweth down, Nebo stoopeth,

their idols were upon the beasts, and upon the cattle:

your carriages were heavy loaden;

they are a burden to the weary beast.

Bel was the sky-god of the Babylonians and the Assyrians. Nebo (or Nabu) was the Babylonian god of scribes and wisdom.

== Verse 4 ==
Even to your old age, I am He,

And even to gray hairs I will carry you!

I have made, and I will bear;

Even I will carry, and will deliver you.

Verse 4 is the inspiration for the Christian hymn: "Safe In Jehovah’s Keeping".

== See also ==
- Bel (mythology)
- Marduk
- Nebo (or Nabu)
- Related Bible parts: Isaiah 44, Jeremiah 50, Jeremiah 51

== Bibliography ==
- Würthwein, Ernst (1995). The Text of the Old Testament. Translated by Rhodes, Erroll F. Grand Rapids, MI: Wm. B. Eerdmans. ISBN 0-8028-0788-7.
