= Jeremiah 30 =

Book of Jeremiah, chapter 30

- ← chapter 29 chapter 31 →
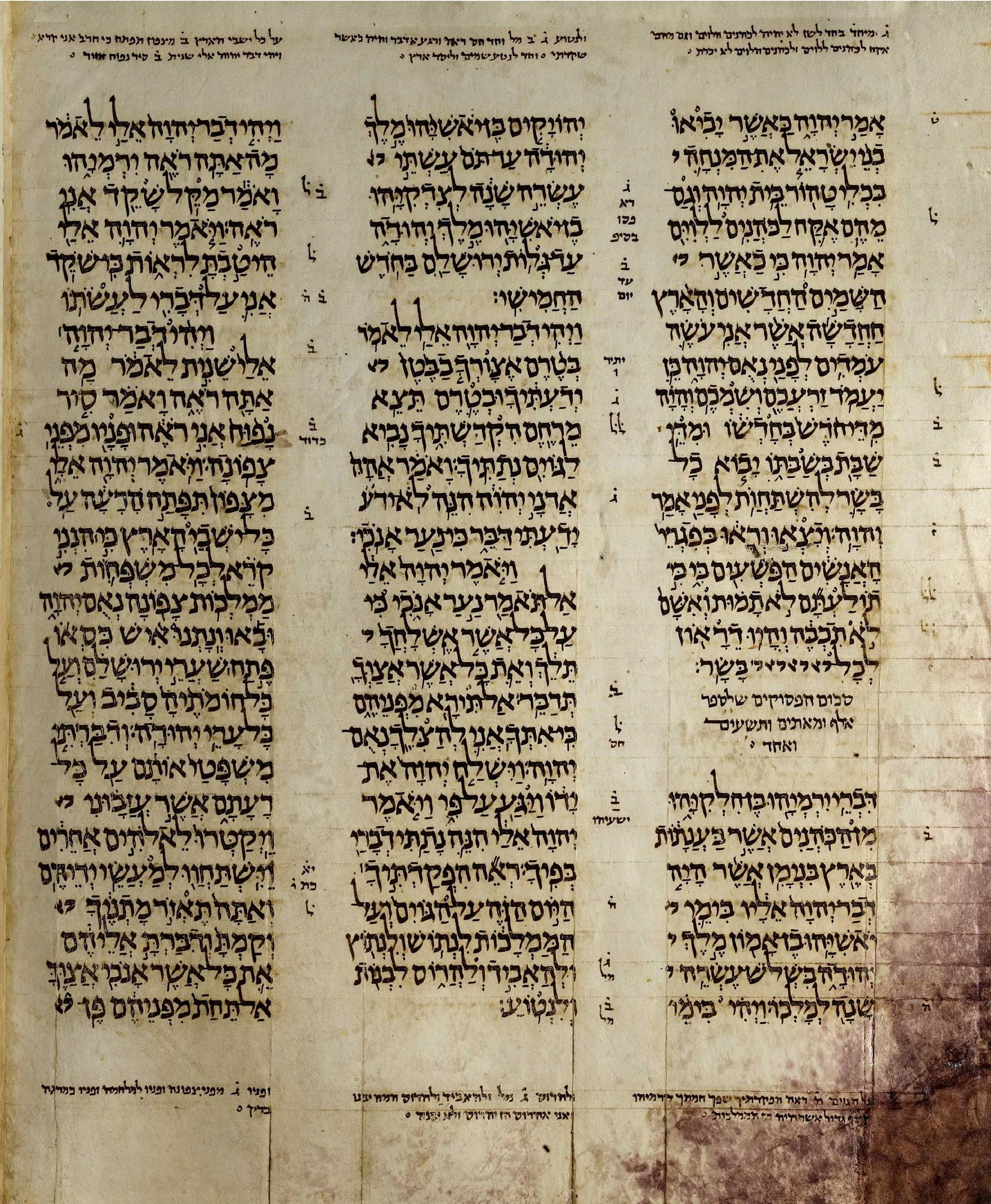
- A high resolution scan of the Aleppo Codex showing the Book of Jeremiah (the sixth book in Nevi'im).
- Book: Book of Jeremiah
- Hebrew Bible part: Nevi'im
- Order in the Hebrew part: 6
- Category: Latter Prophets
- Christian Bible part: Old Testament
- Order in the Christian part: 24

Jeremiah 30 is the thirtieth chapter of the Book of Jeremiah in the Hebrew Bible or the Old Testament of the Christian Bible. It is numbered as Jeremiah 37 in the Septuagint. This book contains prophecies attributed to the prophet Jeremiah, and is one of the Books of the Prophets. The Jerusalem Bible refers to chapters 30 and 31 as "the Book of Consolation", and Lutheran theologian Ernst Hengstenberg calls these two chapters "the triumphal hymn of Israel’s salvation". For Annesley William Streane, chapters 30-33 form a unit whose "whole tone" speaks of hope, contrasting with earlier passages marked with melanchony and prophecies of punishment. This chapter contains the promises to restoration.

== Text ==
The original text of Jeremiah 30 was written in the Hebrew language. This chapter is divided into 24 verses in Christian Bibles, but 25 verses in Hebrew Bibles, because verse 30:25 in the Hebrew Bible is verse 31:1 in Christian Bibles. This article follows the common numbering in Christian English Bible versions, with notes to the numbering in Hebrew Bible versions.

=== Textual witnesses ===
Some early manuscripts containing the text of this chapter in Hebrew are of the Masoretic Text tradition, which includes the Codex Cairensis (895), the Petersburg Codex of the Prophets (916), Aleppo Codex (10th century (Note: Since 1947 the original pages containing the whole chapter were missing, but the notes about them are extant)), Codex Leningradensis (1008). Some fragments containing parts of this chapter were found among the Dead Sea Scrolls, i.e., 4QJer^{c} (4Q72; 1st century BCE), with extant verses 6–9, 17–24 (similar to Masoretic Text).

There is also a translation into Koine Greek known as the Septuagint (with a different chapter and verse numbering), made in the last few centuries BCE. Extant ancient manuscripts of the Septuagint version include Codex Vaticanus (B; $\mathfrak{G}$^{B}; 4th century), Codex Sinaiticus (S; BHK: $\mathfrak{G}$^{S}; 4th century), Codex Alexandrinus (A; $\mathfrak{G}$^{A}; 5th century) and Codex Marchalianus (Q; $\mathfrak{G}$^{Q}; 6th century). The Septuagint version doesn't contain a part what is generally known to be verses 10–11 in Christian Bibles.

=== Verse numbering ===
The order of chapters and verses of the Book of Jeremiah in the English Bibles, Masoretic Text (Hebrew), and Vulgate (Latin), in some places differs from that in Septuagint (LXX, the Greek Bible used in the Eastern Orthodox Church and others) according to Rahlfs or Brenton. The following table is taken with minor adjustments from Brenton's Septuagint, page 971.

The order of Computer Assisted Tools for Septuagint/Scriptural Study (CATSS) based on Alfred Rahlfs' Septuaginta (1935) differs in some details from Joseph Ziegler's critical edition (1957) in Göttingen LXX. Swete's Introduction mostly agrees with Rahlfs' edition (=CATSS).

| Hebrew, Vulgate, English | Rahlfs' LXX (CATSS) | Brenton's LXX |
|---|---|---|
| 30:1-9,12-14,16-21,23-24 | 37:1-9,12-14.16-21,23-24 | |
| 30:10,15,22 | none | |
| 49:1-5,23-27,28-33 | 30:1-5,29-33,23-28 | 30:1-5,23-27,28-33 |

== Parashot ==
The parashah sections listed here are based on the Aleppo Codex, and those in the missing parts of the codex (since 1947) are from Kimhi's notes, marked with an asterisk (*). Jeremiah 30 is a part of the Eleventh prophecy (Jeremiah 30-31) in the Consolations (Jeremiah 30-33) section. As above-mentioned in the "Text" section, verses 30:1-25 in Hebrew Bible below are numbered as 30:1-24; 31:1 in Christian Bible. {P}: open parashah; {S}: closed parashah.

{P*} 30:1-3 {P*} 30:4-9 {S*} 30:10-11 {S*} 30:12-17 {S*} 30:18-22 {S*} 30:23-25 {S*}

== Superscription (30:1–3) ==
The three verses in this part "sound a note of comfort" and serve as an introduction and subscription for chapter 30 and 31 (perhaps also chapter 32 and 33). The chapters 30 and 31 are mostly poetical, except in verse 30:1–4, 8–9; 31:1, 23–24, 38–40, whereas chapters 32 and 33 are generally prose, and the collection of these four chapters is known as "the Book of Consolation" due to its content of "hopes for the future" in contrast to the words of judgement in previous chapters.

=== Verse 2 ===
Thus says the Lord God of Israel: Write all the words that I have spoken to you in a book.

- "Book": likely "a scroll" to record the messages of hope in this and the following chapters (cf. 29:1; 36:2; 51:60; but not the scroll written by Baruch in 36:32).

== Jacob's distress and deliverance (30:4–11) ==
Verse 4 is a heading to the section (verses 5–11) that calls Israel not to despair.

=== Verse 10 ===
‘Therefore do not fear, O My servant Jacob,’ says the Lord,
‘Nor be dismayed, O Israel;
For behold, I will save you from afar,
And your seed from the land of their captivity.
Jacob shall return, have rest and be quiet,
And no one shall make him afraid.

- "Do not fear": a common phrase in prophecy of salvation (Genesis 15:1; Isaiah 35:4; Isaiah 43:1).
- "My servant": this terminology for Israel parallels that of Isaiah 42:1 and Isaiah 44:1.

Verses 10–11 (omitted in Septuagint) have a close parallel with Jeremiah 46:27–28, where are found in Septuagint.

== The healing of Zion's wound (30:12–17) ==
The first part (verses 12–15) brings the grim picture of judgment which befalls the people, notably with distinct sequences of words, such as "hurt", "past-healing", "wound" (verse 12); "no healing", "sore", "no restored flesh" (verse 13), "hurt", "sore", "incurable" (verse 15). However, it is immediately followed by a consolation in verses 16–17 that those bringing suffering to Israel would be caused to suffer, "the devourers would be devoured, "the exilers would be exiled".

== The restoration of Jacob (30:18–22) ==
In this part, God gives the promise of renewal that he would "restore the fortune" (or "bring back from captivity" in 30:3) of "Jacob's tents" (or "clans"; cf. Numbers 24:5–6).

== The divine judgement (30:23-24) ==
The two verses form a fragment, which also occurs in Jeremiah 23:12–17 "with minor variations", closing this chapter with a warning about the punishment for the wicked people who oppressed Israel. This fragment continues to Jeremiah 31:1.

== See also ==
- David
- Israel
- Jacob
- Josiah
- Judah
- Zion
- Related Bible parts: Isaiah 35, Isaiah 41, Isaiah 42, Isaiah 43, Isaiah 44

== Sources ==
- Coogan, Michael David (2007). Coogan, Michael David; Brettler, Marc Zvi; Newsom, Carol Ann; Perkins, Pheme (eds.). The New Oxford Annotated Bible with the Apocryphal/Deuterocanonical Books: New Revised Standard Version, Issue 48 (Augmented 3rd ed.). Oxford University Press. ISBN 9780195288810.
- Huey, F. B. (1993). The New American Commentary - Jeremiah, Lamentations: An Exegetical and Theological Exposition of Holy Scripture, NIV Text. B&H Publishing Group. ISBN 9780805401165.
- Ofer, Yosef (1992). "The Aleppo Codex and the Bible of R. Shalom Shachna Yellin" in Rabbi Mordechai Breuer Festschrift: Collected Papers in Jewish Studies, ed. M. Bar-Asher, 1:295-353. Jerusalem (in Hebrew). Online text (PDF)
- Thompson, J. A. (1980). A Book of Jeremiah. The New International Commentary on the Old Testament (illustrated, revised ed.). Wm. B. Eerdmans Publishing. ISBN 9780802825308.
- Würthwein, Ernst (1995). The Text of the Old Testament. Translated by Rhodes, Erroll F. Grand Rapids, MI: Wm. B. Eerdmans. ISBN 978-0-8028-0788-5.
