= Isaiah 45 =

45th chapter of the Book of Isaiah in the Hebrew Bible

- ← chapter 44 chapter 46 →
- The Great Isaiah Scroll, the best preserved of the biblical scrolls found at Qumran from the second century BC, contains all the verses in this chapter.
- Book: Book of Isaiah
- Hebrew Bible part: Nevi'im
- Order in the Hebrew part: 5
- Category: Latter Prophets
- Christian Bible part: Old Testament
- Order in the Christian part: 23

Isaiah 45 is the forty-fifth chapter of the Book of Isaiah in the Hebrew Bible or the Old Testament of the Christian Bible. This book contains the prophecies attributed to the prophet Isaiah, and is one of the Books of the Prophets.

== Text ==
The original text was written in Hebrew language. Some early manuscripts containing the text of this chapter in Hebrew belong to the Masoretic Text tradition, which includes the Codex Cairensis (895), the Petersburg Codex of the Prophets (916), Aleppo Codex (10th century), and Codex Leningradensis (1008).

Fragments containing parts of this chapter were found among the Dead Sea Scrolls (3rd century BC or later):

- 1QIsa^{a}: complete
- 1QIsa^{b}: extant: verses 1‑13
- 4QIsa^{b} (4Q56): extant: verses 20‑25
- 4QIsa^{c} (4Q57): extant: verses 1‑4, 6‑13

There is also a translation into Koine Greek known as the Septuagint, made in the last few centuries BCE. Extant ancient manuscripts of the Septuagint version include Codex Vaticanus (B; $\mathfrak{G}$^{B}; 4th century), Codex Sinaiticus (S; BHK: $\mathfrak{G}$^{S}; 4th century), Codex Alexandrinus (A; $\mathfrak{G}$^{A}; 5th century) and Codex Marchalianus (Q; $\mathfrak{G}$^{Q}; 6th century).

This chapter is divided into 25 verses.

== Parashot ==
The parashah sections listed here are based on the Aleppo Codex. Isaiah 45 is a part of the Consolations (Isaiah 40–66). {P}: open parashah; {S}: closed parashah.

{P} 45:1-7 {P} 45:8 {S} 45:9 {S} 45:10 {S} 45:11-13 {S} 45:14-17 {P} 45:18-25 [46:1-2 {P}]

== Verse 1 ==
Thus saith the LORD to His anointed, to Cyrus, whose right hand I have holden, to subdue nations before him, and to loose the loins of kings; to open the doors before him, and that the gates may not be shut.

The Septuagint refers to Cyrus the Great as "my anointed". The Greek soldier Xenophon gives an account of the nations which were subdued by Cyrus in his Anabasis, Book 1.

== Verse 2 ==
"I will go before you and level the exalted places, I will break in pieces the doors of bronze and cut through the bars of iron."

The Septuagint here refers to "mountains" rather than "exalted places".

== Verse 4 ==
For the sake of Jacob my servant, of Israel my chosen, I summon you by name and bestow on you a title of honor, though you do not acknowledge me.

— Isaiah 45:4: New International Version

Some older translations state "I have surnamed you".

== Verse 13 ==
I have roused him up in victory, and I make level all his ways; he shall build My city, and he shall let Mine exiles go free, not for price nor reward, saith the LORD of hosts.

— Isaiah 45:13

== Verse 14 ==
Thus saith the LORD: The labour of Egypt, and the merchandise of Ethiopia, and of the Sabeans, men of stature, shall come over unto thee, and they shall be thine; they shall go after thee, in chains they shall come over; and they shall fall down unto thee, they shall make supplication unto thee: Surely God is in thee, and there is none else, there is no other God.

— Isaiah 45:14

The Egyptian, Ethiopian and Sabaean peoples "are apparently represented here as already conquered by Cyrus". The text may be interpreted as foretelling "spontaneous homage rendered to Israel by distant nations of the earth", or in terms of a prospective conquest; for John Skinner, in the Cambridge Bible for Schools and Colleges, "the whole scene strongly suggests a submission that has been preceded by humiliation and defeat. The meaning probably is that the treasures of the nations are made over to Israel by Cyrus".

== Verse 25 ==
In the LORD shall all the seed of Israel be justified, and shall glory.

— Isaiah 45:25

== Uses ==
=== Music ===
"Isaiah 45:23" is a song title in the album "The Life of the World to Come" inspired by this verse that was released by the American band The Mountain Goats in 2009.

== See also ==
- Cyrus the Great
- Related Bible parts: Isaiah 44

== Bibliography ==
- Würthwein, Ernst (1995). The Text of the Old Testament. Translated by Rhodes, Erroll F. Grand Rapids, MI: Wm. B. Eerdmans. ISBN 0-8028-0788-7.
