= Isaiah 47 =

Book of Isaiah, chapter 47

- ← chapter 46 chapter 48 →
- The Great Isaiah Scroll, the best preserved of the biblical scrolls found at Qumran from the second century BC, contains all the verses in this chapter.
- Book: Book of Isaiah
- Hebrew Bible part: Nevi'im
- Order in the Hebrew part: 5
- Category: Latter Prophets
- Christian Bible part: Old Testament
- Order in the Christian part: 23

Isaiah 47 is the forty-seventh chapter of the Book of Isaiah in the Hebrew Bible or the Old Testament of the Christian Bible. This book contains the prophecies attributed to the prophet Isaiah, and is a part of the Books of the Prophets. Isaiah 40-55 is known as "Deutero-Isaiah" and dates from the time of the Israelites' exile in Babylon. Chapter 47 concerns the fall of Babylon, which is personified as a woman, "the virgin daughter of Babylon", "daughter of the Chaldeans", no longer to be called "the Lady of Kingdoms" or "a Lady for ever".

== Text ==
The original text was written in Hebrew language. This chapter is divided into 15 verses.

The New King James Version calls this chapter "The Humiliation of Babylon" and the Jerusalem Bible calls it a qinah or "lament for Babylon".

=== Textual witnesses ===
Some early manuscripts containing the text of this chapter in Hebrew are of the Masoretic Text tradition, which includes the Codex Cairensis (895), the Petersburg Codex of the Prophets (916), Aleppo Codex (10th century), Codex Leningradensis (1008).

Fragments containing parts of this chapter were found among the Dead Sea Scrolls (3rd century BC or later):

- 1QIsa^{a}: complete
- 1QIsa^{b}: extant: verses 1‑14
- 4QIsa^{d} (4Q58): extant: verses 1‑6, 8‑9

There is also a translation into Koine Greek known as the Septuagint, made in the last few centuries BCE. Extant ancient manuscripts of the Septuagint version include Codex Vaticanus (B; $\mathfrak{G}$^{B}; 4th century), Codex Sinaiticus (S; BHK: $\mathfrak{G}$^{S}; 4th century), Codex Alexandrinus (A; $\mathfrak{G}$^{A}; 5th century) and Codex Marchalianus (Q; $\mathfrak{G}$^{Q}; 6th century).

== Parashot ==
The parashah sections listed here are based on the Aleppo Codex. Isaiah 47 is a part of the Consolations (Isaiah 40–66). {P}: open parashah; {S}: closed parashah.

{S} 47:1-3 {P} 47:4-7 {P} 47:8-15 {S}

== Verse 4 ==
As for our redeemer,

the Lord of hosts is his name,

the Holy One of Israel.

== Verse 9 ==
But these two things shall come to thee in a moment in one day,

the loss of children, and widowhood:

they shall come upon thee in their perfection for the multitude of thy sorceries,

and for the great abundance of thine enchantments.

== See also ==
- Babylon
- Chaldean
- Related Bible parts: Isaiah 46, Ezekiel 16, Revelation 17, Revelation 18

== Bibliography ==
- Würthwein, Ernst (1995). The Text of the Old Testament. Translated by Rhodes, Erroll F. Grand Rapids, MI: Wm. B. Eerdmans. ISBN 0-8028-0788-7.
