= Isaiah 35 =

Book of Isaiah, chapter 35

- ← chapter 34 chapter 36 →
- The Great Isaiah Scroll, the best preserved of the biblical scrolls found at Qumran from the second century BC, contains all the verses in this chapter.
- Book: Book of Isaiah
- Hebrew Bible part: Nevi'im
- Order in the Hebrew part: 5
- Category: Latter Prophets
- Christian Bible part: Old Testament
- Order in the Christian part: 23

Isaiah 35 is the thirty-fifth chapter of the Book of Isaiah in the Hebrew Bible or the Old Testament of the Christian Bible. This book contains the prophecies attributed to the prophet Isaiah, and is one of the Books of the Prophets. This chapter continues a prophecy commenced in the previous chapter, and forms the final chapter in a group (chapters 28–35) which the Jerusalem Bible calls a collection of "poems on Israel and Judah". The New King James Version entitles this chapter "The Future Glory of Zion".

== Text ==
The original text was written in Hebrew language. This chapter is divided into 10 verses.

=== Textual witnesses ===
Some early manuscripts containing the text of this chapter in Hebrew are of the Masoretic Text tradition, which includes the Isaiah Scroll (1Qlsa^{a}; 356-100 BCE), Codex Cairensis (895 CE), the Petersburg Codex of the Prophets (916), Aleppo Codex (10th century), Codex Leningradensis (1008).

There is also a translation into Koine Greek known as the Septuagint, made in the last few centuries BCE. Extant ancient manuscripts of the Septuagint version include Codex Vaticanus (B; $\mathfrak{G}$^{B}; 4th century), Codex Sinaiticus (S; BHK: $\mathfrak{G}$^{S}; 4th century), Codex Alexandrinus (A; $\mathfrak{G}$^{A}; 5th century) and Codex Marchalianus (Q; $\mathfrak{G}$^{Q}; 6th century).

== Parashot ==
The parashah sections listed here are based on the Aleppo Codex. Isaiah 35 is a part of the Prophecies about Judah and Israel (Isaiah 24–35). {P}: open parashah; {S}: closed parashah.

{S} 35:1-2 {P} 35:3-10 {S} (Note: In the Leningrad Codex, the parashah sections are: {S} 35:1-2 {S} 35:3-10 {P})

== Analysis ==
This chapter shares similar imagery with later parts of Isaiah (chapters 40–66), such as:

- God's glory (verse 2; cf. Isaiah 40:5)
- Opening the eyes of the blind and healing the lame (verses 5–6; cf. Isaiah 40:5; Isaiah 42:7
- The promise of a highway through the desert (verse 8ff; cf. Isaiah 40:3; 62:10)

=== Verse 1 ===
The wilderness and the solitary place shall be glad for them; and the desert shall rejoice, and blossom as the rose.

This verse uses three terms for desolate places: מִדְבָּר (midbar, "wilderness"), צִיָּה (tsiyyah, "dry place, desert"; KJV: "solitary place"), and עֲרָבָה (ʿaravah, "rift valley"; KJV: "desert"). A midbar is an area that receives less than twelve inches of rain per year and may have some pasturage (if receiving six to twelve inches of rain), but often has desert-like qualities. A tsiyyah does not refer to 'a sandy desert per se', but among the three terms 'most clearly indicates a dry, desert region'. The "rift valley" includes the Jordan Valley, yet 'it still has a reputation as a dry, desolate place from its conditions near the Dead Sea and southward'.

- "Rose": is translated from the Hebrew word ḥăḇatzeleṯ, that occurs two times in the scriptures, beside in this verse also in Song of Songs 2:1, and rendered variously as "lily" (Septuagint "κρίνον", Vulgate "lilium", Wiclif "lily"), "jonquil" (Jerusalem Bible) and "crocus" (RSV)

=== Verse 4 ===
Say to those who have an anxious heart,

"Be strong; fear not!
Behold, your God will come with vengeance, with the recompense of God.
He will come and save you."

The Hebrew wording refers to those "of a hasty heart". Albert Barnes associates the word with "those who are disposed to flee before their enemies".

=== Verse 5 ===
Then the eyes of the blind shall be opened,

and the ears of the deaf shall be unstopped.

Jesus cited this verse in claiming these prophecies to himself, when he spoke to the disciples of John the Baptist as recorded in Matthew 11:4, 5. Jesus performed the miracles of giving sight to the blind people multiple times, providing the proof that 'he was the Messiah sent from God' (Matthew 9:27; Matthew 20:30; Mark 8:23; Mark 10:46; Luke 7:21).

=== Verse 6 ===
Then shall the lame man leap as an hart, and the tongue of the dumb sing: for in the wilderness shall waters break out, and streams in the desert.

- "The lame man [shall] leap as an hart" may be compared to the healing of lame men by Christ (Matthew 15:30) and by Peter (Acts 3:1).

=== Verse 10 ===
And the ransomed of the LORD shall return, and come to Zion with songs and everlasting joy upon their heads: they shall obtain joy and gladness, and sorrow and sighing shall flee away.

- "The ransomed of the Lord shall return": from Hebrew: ופדויי יהוה ישבון, ū-p̄ə-ḏū-yê Yah-weh yə-šu-ḇūn, "And_the_ransomed of_Yahweh shall_return"; in combination with the last phrase of verse 9: "and the redeemed will walk, the ransomed of the Lord will return."
- "On their heads": from Hebrew: על־ראשם, ‘al-rō-šām, "[will be] on their head[s]"; NET: "will crown them". "Joy" here is likened to a crown (cf. 2 Samuel 1:10), which may also be 'an ironic twist on the idiom "earth/dust on the head" (cf. 2 Samuel 1:2; 13:19; 15:32; Job 2:12), referring to a mourning practice'.
- "They shall obtain": from Hebrew: ישיגו, ya-syî-ḡū,, "will overtake" (NIV); NLT: "they will be overcome with"; NET: "will overwhelm them".
- "And sorrow and sighing shall flee away" (KJV/NKJV): from Hebrew: ונסו יגון ואנחה, wə-nā-sū yā-ḡō-wn wa-’ă-nā-ḥāh, "and_shall_flee_away sorrow and_sighing or "grief and groaning will flee"; NET: "grief and suffering will disappear".

The theme of "sorrow and sighing" can be linked to the elaboration in Isaiah 65.

== Uses ==
=== Music ===
The Catholic theologian Friedrich Dörr based an Advent song, "Kündet allen in der Not", on verses from this chapter.

Verses 5–6 of the King James Version of this chapter are cited as texts in the English-language oratorio "Messiah" by George Frideric Handel (HWV 56).

== See also ==
- Carmel
- Lebanon
- Miracles of Jesus
- Sharon
- Related Bible parts: Matthew 9, Matthew 11, Matthew 12, Matthew 20, Matthew 21, Mark 7, Mark 8, Mark 9, Mark 10, Luke 7, Luke 11, John 9, Acts 3, Acts 14

== Sources ==
- Childs, Brevard S. (2001). Isaiah. Westminster John Knox Press. ISBN 9780664221430.
- Coggins, R (2007). "22. Isaiah". In Barton, John; Muddiman, John (eds.). The Oxford Bible Commentary (first (paperback) ed.). Oxford University Press. pp. 433–486. ISBN 978-0199277186.
- Würthwein, Ernst (1995). The Text of the Old Testament. Translated by Rhodes, Erroll F. Grand Rapids, MI: Wm. B. Eerdmans. ISBN 0-8028-0788-7.
