= Isaiah 42 =

Book of Isaiah, chapter 42

- ← chapter 41 chapter 43 →
- The Great Isaiah Scroll, the best preserved of the biblical scrolls found at Qumran from the second century BC, contains all the verses in this chapter.
- Book: Book of Isaiah
- Hebrew Bible part: Nevi'im
- Order in the Hebrew part: 5
- Category: Latter Prophets
- Christian Bible part: Old Testament
- Order in the Christian part: 23

Isaiah 42 is the forty-second chapter of the Book of Isaiah in both the Hebrew Bible and the Old Testament of the Christian Bible. This book contains the prophecies attributed to the prophet Isaiah, and is a part of the Books of the Prophets.

== Suffering servant ==
Chapters 40-55 are known by scholars as "Deutero-Isaiah" and date from the time of the Israelites' exile in Babylon. Chapter 42 contains a poem known as the first of the "servant songs", concerning a servant whom Rabbinic Jewish tradition holds is either the Israelites themselves (Hebrew: אור לגויים, or l'goyim) or Cyrus the Great. This in contrast to Jewish Christian and later gentile Christian tradition, which holds that the servant is Jesus. Islamic tradition holds that the servant is Muhammad.

=== Israel as the suffering servant ===
Scholars such as John Goldingay, John Barton, and John Muddiman also hold the view that the Old Testament identifies the servant of the servant songs as the Israelites in Is. 41:8-9; Is. 44:1; Is. 44:21; Is. 45:4; Is. 48:20 and Is. 49:3. The latter two write that "The idea of a 'servant' played a small part in the earlier chapters, being used as a designation of the unworthy Eliakim in 22:20 and of the figure of David in 37:35, but it now comes to the fore as a description of major significance, the noun being used more than 20 times in chs. 40-55. Its first usage is obviously important in establishing the sense in which we are to understand it, and here it is clear that the community of Israel/Jacob is so described."

== Text ==
The original text was written in Hebrew language. This chapter is divided into 25 verses.

=== Textual witnesses ===
Some early manuscripts containing the text of this chapter in Hebrew are of the Masoretic Text tradition, which includes the Codex Cairensis (895), the Petersburg Codex of the Prophets (916), Aleppo Codex (10th century), Codex Leningradensis (1008).

Fragments containing parts of this chapter were found among the Dead Sea Scrolls (3rd century BC or later):

- 1QIsa^{a}: complete
- 4QIsa^{g} (4Q61): extant verses 14‑25
- 4QIsa^{h} (4Q62): extant verses 2, 4‑11
- 4QIsa^{i} (4Q62^{a}): extant verses 4‑11

There is also a translation into Koine Greek known as the Septuagint, made in the last few centuries BCE. Extant ancient manuscripts of the Septuagint version include Codex Vaticanus (B; $\mathfrak{G}$^{B}; 4th century), Codex Sinaiticus (S; BHK: $\mathfrak{G}$^{S}; 4th century), Codex Alexandrinus (A; $\mathfrak{G}$^{A}; 5th century) and Codex Marchalianus (Q; $\mathfrak{G}$^{Q}; 6th century).

== Parashot ==
The parashah sections listed here are based on the Aleppo Codex. Isaiah 42 is a part of the Consolations (Isaiah 40–66). {P}: open parashah; {S}: closed parashah.

{P} 42:1-4 {P} 42:5-9 {P} 42:10-13 {S} 42:14-17 {P} 42:18-25 [43:1-10 {S}]

== Verse 1 ==
"Behold! My Servant whom I uphold,
My Elect One in whom My soul delights!
I have put My Spirit upon Him;
He will bring forth justice to the Gentiles."

- Cross references: Isaiah 44:1, Jeremiah 30:10, Matthew 12:18

The Synoptic Gospels each allude to verse 1 in their accounts of the Baptism of Jesus, when the Holy Spirit descends like a dove upon Jesus and a "voice from heaven" acclaims Him as "My Beloved Son, in whom I am well pleased." (Matthew 3:17; Mark 1:11; Luke 3:22).

== Verse 3 ==
A bruised reed shall he not break, and the smoking flax shall he not quench: he shall bring forth judgment unto truth.

In Isaiah 36:6, Sennacherib, king of Assyria, had referred to Egypt as a "broken reed", criticising Israel's dependence on Egypt during the reign of king Hezekiah.

- "Smoking" or "dimly burning"
- "Quench" or "extinguish" from the Hebrew root: k-b-h (כבה, kabah, "to be quenched or extinguished, to go out"), is also used in Isaiah 1:31 and Isaiah 66:24 for: "the fire that shall not be quenched"; Isaiah 34:10: 'the fire devouring Edom "will not be quenched"'; as well as in 43:17: 'those who oppose the LORD'S path are "quenched like a wick"'.

== Verse 4 ==
He shall not fail nor be discouraged, till he have set judgment in the earth: and the isles shall wait for his law.

- "Be discouraged": from Hebrew: יָר֔וּץ, yā-rūts, "bruised", from the root word "crushed" (רָצַץ, ratsats), used to describe "crushed reed" (or "bruised reed") and "dim (כָּהָה, kahah) wick" (or "smoking flax") in verse 3, repeated here for rhetorical effect.
- "Isles" (KJV):from Hebrew: אִיִּ֥ים, ’î-yîm, "coastlands" (ESV; MEV; NET; NKJV); "islands" (NIV); "distant lands beyond the sea."(NLT)
- "His law" (KJV, ASV, NASB, NIV): from Hebrew: תוֹרָת֖וֹ, ṯō-w-rā-ṯōw, "his decrees" (NET), "his instruction" (NLT).

== Verse 7 ==
To open the blind eyes, to bring out the prisoners from the prison, and them that sit in darkness out of the prison house.

- "Blind eyes": both physical and spiritual (Isaiah 29:18; 32:3; 35:5; 42:16, 18, 19; John 9:39), here may specially be for spiritual blindness by the comment of verses 16–19 (cf. Paul's calling in Acts 26:18). This is in contrast to Isaiah's own mission (Isaiah 6:10).
- "To bring out the prisoners from the prison": cf. Isaiah 61:1-2. For different aspects of "prison", see "prisoners of hope" in Zechariah 9:11, and the "spirits in prison" in 1 Peter 3:19.

== New Testament ==
In Matthew 12:17–21, Isaiah 42:1–4 is cited as a fulfillment of Isaiah's prophecies in the life and work of Jesus Christ:

And great multitudes followed Him, and He healed them all. Yet He warned them not to make Him known, that it might be fulfilled which was spoken by Isaiah the prophet, saying:

"Behold! My Servant whom I have chosen,

My Beloved in whom My soul is well pleased!

I will put My Spirit upon Him,

And He will declare justice to the Gentiles.

He will not quarrel nor cry out,

Nor will anyone hear His voice in the streets.

A bruised reed He will not break,

And smoking flax He will not quench,

Till He sends forth justice to victory;

And in His name Gentiles will trust."

== Islamic interpretation ==
Muslim tradition holds that Isaiah 42 predicted the coming of a servant associated with Qedar, the second son of Ishmael and who went on to live his life in Arabia (see Isaiah 42:11). Isaiah 42:11 also mentions that the people of "Sela" - interpreted here as the mountain of Sela near present-day Medina, Saudi Arabia - would "sing for joy" and "shout from the mountain tops", and so interpret this passage as prophesising the coming of Prophet Muhammad and his migration to Medina which was rejoiced by the Ansār and the Muhajirūn.

== See also ==
- Christian messianic prophecies
- Christianity and Judaism
- Jewish messianism
- Messianic prophecies of Jesus
- New Covenant
- Related Bible parts: Isaiah 44, Isaiah 49, Isaiah 50, Isaiah 52, Isaiah 53, Jeremiah 30, Matthew 3; Matthew 12, Mark 1, Luke 3

== Sources ==
- Coggins, R (2007). "22. Isaiah". In Barton, John; Muddiman, John (eds.). The Oxford Bible Commentary (first (paperback) ed.). Oxford University Press. pp. 433–486. ISBN 978-0199277186.
- Würthwein, Ernst (1995). The Text of the Old Testament. Translated by Rhodes, Erroll F. Grand Rapids, MI: Wm. B. Eerdmans. ISBN 0-8028-0788-7.
