= Isaiah 60 =

Book of Isaiah, chapter 60

- ← chapter 59 chapter 61 →
- The Great Isaiah Scroll, the best preserved of the biblical scrolls found at Qumran from the second century BC, contains all the verses in this chapter.
- Book: Book of Isaiah
- Hebrew Bible part: Nevi'im
- Order in the Hebrew part: 5
- Category: Latter Prophets
- Christian Bible part: Old Testament
- Order in the Christian part: 23

Isaiah 60 is the sixtieth chapter of the Book of Isaiah in the Hebrew Bible or the Old Testament of the Christian Bible. This book contains the prophecies attributed to the prophet Isaiah, and is one of the Books of the Prophets. Chapters 56–66 are often referred to as Trito-Isaiah, with chapters 60–62, "three magnificent chapters", often seen as the "high-point" of Trito-Isaiah. Here, the prophet "hails the rising sun of Jerusalem’s prosperity".

== Text ==
The original text was written in Hebrew language. This chapter is divided into 22 verses. Some early biblical manuscripts containing the text of this chapter in Hebrew are of the Masoretic Text tradition, which includes the Codex Cairensis (895), the Petersburg Codex of the Prophets (916), Aleppo Codex (10th century), and Leningrad Codex (1008). Fragments containing parts of this chapter were found among the Dead Sea Scrolls (3rd century BCE or later)

- 1QIsa^{a}: complete
- 1QIsa^{b}: complete
- 4QIsa^{h} (4Q62): extant: verses 20–22

There is also a translation into Koine Greek known as the Septuagint, made in the last few centuries BCE. Extant ancient manuscripts of the Septuagint version include Codex Vaticanus (B; $\mathfrak{G}$^{B}; 4th century), Codex Sinaiticus (S; BHK: $\mathfrak{G}$^{S}; 4th century), Codex Alexandrinus (A; $\mathfrak{G}$^{A}; 5th century) and Codex Marchalianus (Q; $\mathfrak{G}$^{Q}; 6th century).

== Parashot ==
The parashah sections listed here are based on the Aleppo Codex. Isaiah 60 is a part of the Consolations (Isaiah 40–66). {S}: closed parashah.

{S} 60:1-22 {S}

== Contents and commentary ==
Biblical commentator Richard Coggins contrasts the opening verses of this chapter with Isaiah's vision in chapter 6, where God's glory, which the prophet beheld in his vision, was said to cover "the whole earth". In chapter 60, the "glory of the LORD" rises over the saved community of Israel, while the rest of the earth, and the rest of the earth's population, appear to remain in darkness. Light does come to other nations, but "only by way of Israel".

=== Verse 3 ===
The Gentiles shall come to your light,

And kings to the brightness of your rising.

The gentiles, or the nations, are those of Israel's biblical past (see verse 6), rather than those who in more recent times had overrun and ruled over Israel (the Assyrians, Babylonians and Persians). Cross-references include Isaiah 2:3, Isaiah 11:10, Isaiah 43:6, Isaiah 49:22: See, I will beckon to the nations, and Isaiah 66:12.

=== Verse 6 ===
The multitude of camels shall cover your land,

The dromedaries of Midian and Ephah;

All those from Sheba shall come;

They shall bring gold and incense,

And they shall proclaim the praises of the Lord.

The English Standard Version refers to young camels in place of dromedaries. The gold and incense mentioned here provide "part of the literary background" to the visit of the Magi recorded in the New Testament in Matthew 2.

=== Verse 8 ===
Who are these that come flying as a cloud, and as doves to their dove-cotes?

This and the following verse (the ships of Tarshish) refer to the ships of the Mediterranean, turning the prophet's focus from the east to the west.

== Uses ==
=== Music ===
The King James Version of verses 1–3 from this chapter are cited as texts in the English-language oratorio "Messiah" by George Frideric Handel (HWV 56).

== See also ==
- Adoration of the Magi
- Christian messianic prophecies
- Christianity and Judaism
- Nativity of Jesus
- Jewish messianism
- Messianic prophecies of Jesus
- New Covenant, Replacement theology
- Related Bible parts: Psalm 72, Isaiah 2, Isaiah 11, Isaiah 43, Isaiah 49, Isaiah 66, Matthew 2

== Bibliography ==
- Würthwein, Ernst (1995). The Text of the Old Testament. Translated by Rhodes, Erroll F. Grand Rapids, MI: Wm. B. Eerdmans. ISBN 0-8028-0788-7.
