= Isaiah 34 =

Book of Isaiah, chapter 34

- ← chapter 33 chapter 35 →
- The Great Isaiah Scroll, the best preserved of the biblical scrolls found at Qumran from the second century BC, contains all the verses in this chapter.
- Book: Book of Isaiah
- Hebrew Bible part: Nevi'im
- Order in the Hebrew part: 5
- Category: Latter Prophets
- Christian Bible part: Old Testament
- Order in the Christian part: 23

Isaiah 34 is the thirty-fourth chapter of the Book of Isaiah in the Hebrew Bible or the Old Testament of the Christian Bible. This book contains the prophecies attributed to the prophet Isaiah, and is one of the Books of the Prophets. The Jerusalem Bible groups chapters 28-35 together as a collection of "poems on Israel and Judah", although this chapter is addressed to all nations and to Edom in particular.

== Text ==
The original text was written in the Hebrew language. This chapter is divided into 17 verses.

=== Textual witnesses ===
Some early manuscripts containing the text of this chapter in Hebrew are found among the Dead Sea Scrolls, i.e., the Isaiah Scroll (1Qlsa^{a}; complete; 356-100 BCE), and of the Masoretic Text tradition, which includes Codex Cairensis (895 CE), the Petersburg Codex of the Prophets (916), Aleppo Codex (10th century), Codex Leningradensis (1008).

There is also a translation into Koine Greek known as the Septuagint, made in the last few centuries BCE. Extant ancient manuscripts of the Septuagint version include Codex Vaticanus (B; $\mathfrak{G}$^{B}; 4th century), Codex Sinaiticus (S; BHK: $\mathfrak{G}$^{S}; 4th century), Codex Alexandrinus (A; $\mathfrak{G}$^{A}; 5th century) and Codex Marchalianus (Q; $\mathfrak{G}$^{Q}; 6th century).

== Parashot ==
The parashah sections listed here are based on the Aleppo Codex. Isaiah 34 is a part of the Prophecies about Judah and Israel (Isaiah 24–35). {S}: closed parashah.

{S} 34:1-17 {S}

== Judgment on the nations (34:1–4) ==
Verses 1—4 give a horrifying picture of cosmic disaster that brings to an end not just enemy nations but also the 'host of heaven' and the skies.

=== Verse 1 ===
Come near, ye nations, to hear; and hearken, ye people:

let the earth hear, and all that is therein;

the world, and all things that come forth of it.

This introductory summons recalls Psalm 49:1, painting a picture of cosmic disaster in a way of an apocalypse.

== Judgment on Edom (34:5–17) ==
Starting verse 5, the judgment is specifically for Edom, who according to the tradition of Genesis 25:29–34, should have seen with Israel as brothers, but ending up having a bitter hatred with one another.

=== Verse 10 ===
It shall not be quenched night nor day;

the smoke thereof shall go up for ever:

from generation to generation it shall lie waste;

none shall pass through it for ever and ever.

- "Quenched": from the Hebrew root: k-b-h (כבה, kabah, "to be quenched or extinguished, to go out"), is also used in Isaiah 1:31 and 66:24 for: "the fire that shall not be quenched"; of the servant in 42:3, that "a dimly burning wick ('smoking flax') he will not quench"; as well as in 43:17: 'those who oppose the LORD'S path are "quenched like a wick"'.

=== Verse 14 ===
The wild beasts of the desert shall also meet with the jackals,

And the wild goat shall bleat to its companion;

Also the night creature shall rest there,

And find for herself a place of rest.

- "Jackals" (KJV: "the wild beasts of the island"): literally, "howling creatures"
- "Night creature" (KJV: "screech owl"): translated from Hebrew: לִילִית, lilith, in this context certainly refers to 'some type of wild animal or bird', and appears to be related to לַיְלָה, laylah (meaning "night"). Some interpret it as the name of a female night demon, on the basis of an apparent Akkadian cognate used as the name of a demon. Later Jewish legends also identified "Lilith" as a demon.

== See also ==
- Edom
- Zion
- Related Bible parts: Isaiah 63:1-6, Hosea 9, Nahum 1, Matthew 24, Revelation 6, Revelation 16, Revelation 19, Revelation 20

== Sources ==
- Coggins, R (2007). "22. Isaiah". In Barton, John; Muddiman, John (eds.). The Oxford Bible Commentary (first (paperback) ed.). Oxford University Press. pp. 433–486. ISBN 978-0199277186.
- Würthwein, Ernst (1995). The Text of the Old Testament. Translated by Rhodes, Erroll F. Grand Rapids, MI: Wm. B. Eerdmans. ISBN 0-8028-0788-7.
