= Isaiah 43 =

Book of Isaiah, chapter 43

- ← chapter 42 chapter 44 →
- The Great Isaiah Scroll, the best preserved of the biblical scrolls found at Qumran from the second century BC, contains all the verses in this chapter.
- Book: Book of Isaiah
- Hebrew Bible part: Nevi'im
- Order in the Hebrew part: 5
- Category: Latter Prophets
- Christian Bible part: Old Testament
- Order in the Christian part: 23

Isaiah 43 is the forty-third chapter of the Book of Isaiah in the Hebrew Bible or the Old Testament of the Christian Bible. This book contains the prophecies attributed to the prophet Isaiah, and is one of the Books of the Prophets.

Chapters 40–55 are known as "Deutero-Isaiah" and date from the time of the Israelites' exile in Babylon. This chapter "refers mainly to the promised deliverance from Babylon". "But now", the opening words of this chapter, reverse the tone of the latter part of Isaiah 42, connecting the two chapters. In Isaiah 42:18–25, the prophet has rebuked the people of Israel for their blindness and deafness; in Isaiah 43:8 he calls for "the blind people who have eyes, and the deaf who have ears" to hear the proclamation of a "new Exodus".

== Text ==
The original text was written in the Hebrew language. This chapter is divided into 28 verses.

=== Textual witnesses ===
Some early manuscripts containing the text of this chapter in Hebrew are of the Masoretic Text tradition, which includes the Codex Cairensis (895), the Petersburg Codex of the Prophets (916), Aleppo Codex (10th century), Codex Leningradensis (1008).

Fragments containing parts of this chapter were found among the Dead Sea Scrolls (3rd century BC or later):

- 1QIsa^{a}: complete
- 1QIsa^{b}: extant: verses 2–14, 20‑21, 23-27
- 4QIsa^{b} (4Q56): extant: verses 12‑15
- 4QIsa^{g} (4Q61): extant: verses 1–4, 17-24

There is also a translation into Koine Greek known as the Septuagint, made in the last few centuries BCE. Extant ancient manuscripts of the Septuagint version include Codex Vaticanus (B; $\mathfrak{G}$^{B}; 4th century), Codex Sinaiticus (S; BHK: $\mathfrak{G}$^{S}; 4th century), Codex Alexandrinus (A; $\mathfrak{G}$^{A}; 5th century) and Codex Marchalianus (Q; $\mathfrak{G}$^{Q}; 6th century).

== Parashot ==
The parashah sections listed here are based on the Aleppo Codex. Isaiah 43 is a part of the Consolations (Isaiah 40–66). {P}: open parashah; {S}: closed parashah.

[{P} 42:18-25] 43:1-10 {S} 43:11-13 {S} 43:14-15 {S} 43:16-21 {S} 43:22-28 {P}

== The Lord will redeem his people (verses 1–7) ==
This section contains an oracle of salvation, with the repetition of 'Do not fear' in verses 1 and 5 to emphasize the message of reassurance, that YHWH had made the people of Israel part of his family and just as in the past, he is active in delivering them from every kind of danger in the future.

=== Verse 1 ===
But now thus says the Lord,
he who created you, O Jacob,

he who formed you, O Israel:

"Fear not, for I have redeemed you;

I have called you by name, you are mine."

- "Have redeemed you": NCV: “saved you”; CEV: “rescued you”; NLT: “ransomed you"; NET Bible: "will protect you". This is the act of a goel or "kinsman redeemer" (in Hebrew: גֹּאֵל, goʾel) who is 'a protector of the extended family's interests'.

=== Verse 6 ===
I will say to the north, Give up;

and to the south, Keep not back:

bring my sons from far,

and my daughters from the ends of the earth;

- Cross reference: Isaiah 2:3; Isaiah 11:10; Isaiah 49:22; Isaiah 60:3; Isaiah 66:12

== The Lord declares his sovereignty (verses 8–13) ==
In this section the language of a trial returns with the demand for Israel to bear witness to YHWH's deeds, although they are blind and deaf (cf. Isaiah 42:18), to declare the incomparability of YHWH.

=== Verse 10 ===
"You are My witnesses," says the Lord,
"And My servant whom I have chosen,
That you may know and believe Me,
And understand that I am He.
Before Me there was no God formed,
Nor shall there be after Me.

- "Nor shall there be after Me": Hebrew: "and after me, there will not be"; NASB "there will be none after Me."

== The Lord will do something new (verses 14–21) ==
The oracle in this section commands the hearers not to remember the former things as they will pale into insignificance before 'the new thing' that YHWH will do in the future with his saving power.

=== Verse 17 ===
Which bringeth forth the chariot and horse, the army and the power;

they shall lie down together, they shall not rise:

they are extinct, they are quenched as tow.

- "Quenched": from the Hebrew root: k-b-h (כבה, kabah, "to be quenched or extinguished, to go out"), is also used in Isaiah 1:31 and Isaiah 66:24 for: "the fire shall not be quenched"; Isaiah 34:10: 'the fire devouring Edom "will not be quenched"'; as well as of the servant in 42:3, that "a dimly burning wick ('smoking flax') he will not quench".
- Natural tow (in the King James Version) is a broken fibre, removed during the processing of flax, hemp, or jute. Other texts generally use the image of being "quenched like a wick".

=== Verse 18 ===
Remember not the former things,
nor consider the things of old.

"The former things" refers to "events that had been predicted and fulfilled in the past (41:22; 42:9; 43:9; 46:9; 48:3)", in particular to the event of "the Exodus", in contrast to the predicted "new Exodus" which God will perform differently so that it should be "allowed to stand in its own right" (cf. Jeremiah 23:7–8). Verna Holyhead notes that the prophet does not want the people "to forget and discount God's faithfulness", but to appreciate that God will do greater things in the future even than the deeds of the past.

== The Lord rebukes his unfaithful people (verses 22–28) ==
In verses 22–24 YHWH condemns the people for the failure to participate in worship, which seems to be in contrast with what was condemned earlier in Isaiah 1:10—17, that is, 'misplaced enthusiasm for worship' (also similarly condemned in other prophetic passages (Amos 5:18-24; Hosea 6:6; Micah 6:6-8), but this section is 'concerned with the worship of other gods', as emphasized by the repetition of the word 'me' (8 times in 3 verses). Verses 25–28 clarify that the condemnation 'is to be seen in the context of the trial' and the whole community is not free from blame.

=== Verse 24 ===
You have bought Me no sweet cane with money,
Nor have you satisfied Me with the fat of your sacrifices;
But you have burdened Me with your sins,
You have wearied Me with your iniquities.

- "Sweet cane" (Hebrew: qâneh) is also mentioned in Jeremiah 6:20 as coming from a “far country”. Skinner, in the Cambridge Bible for Schools and Colleges, suggests that this refers to calamus odoratus (Plin. 12:12, 48) with scientific name Acorus calamus, a product of India, but grown also in Arabia and Syria. NIV renders it "calamus"; NCV, TEV, NLT "incense"; CEV "spices."
- "Nor have you satisfied Me": Hebrew: "you did not saturate me"; NASB "Neither have you filled Me."

=== Verse 26 ===
Put Me in remembrance;

let us plead together;
state your cause, that you may be justified.

"State your cause, that you may be justified" is translated from Hebrew, literally: "you tell in order that you may be right".

== See also ==
- Babylon
- Egypt
- Ethiopia
- Israel
- Jacob
- Seba
- Related Bible parts: Isaiah 41, Jeremiah 6

== Sources ==
- Coggins, R (2007). "22. Isaiah". In Barton, John; Muddiman, John (eds.). The Oxford Bible Commentary (first (paperback) ed.). Oxford University Press. pp. 433–486. ISBN 978-0199277186.
- Oswalt, John N. (1998). The Book of Isaiah, Chapters 40–66. New international commentary on the Old Testament. Wm. B. Eerdmans Publishing. ISBN 978-0802825346.
- Würthwein, Ernst (1995). The Text of the Old Testament. Translated by Rhodes, Erroll F. Grand Rapids, MI: Wm. B. Eerdmans. ISBN 0-8028-0788-7.
