= Isaiah 44 =

Book of Isaiah, chapter 44

- ← chapter 43 chapter 45 →
- The Great Isaiah Scroll, the best preserved of the biblical scrolls found at Qumran from the second century BC, contains all the verses in this chapter.
- Book: Book of Isaiah
- Hebrew Bible part: Nevi'im
- Order in the Hebrew part: 5
- Category: Latter Prophets
- Christian Bible part: Old Testament
- Order in the Christian part: 23

Isaiah 44 is the forty-fourth chapter of the Book of Isaiah in the Hebrew Bible or the Old Testament of the Christian Bible. This book contains the prophecies attributed to the prophet Isaiah, and is a part of the Books of the Prophets.

== Text ==
The original text was written in Hebrew language. This chapter is divided into 28 verses.

=== Textual witnesses ===
Some early manuscripts containing the text of this chapter in Hebrew are of the Masoretic Text tradition, which includes the Codex Cairensis (895), the Petersburg Codex of the Prophets (916), Aleppo Codex (10th century), Codex Leningradensis (1008).

Fragments containing parts of this chapter were found among the Dead Sea Scrolls (3rd century BC or later):

- 1QIsa^{a}: complete
- 1QIsa^{b}: extant: verses 21-28
- 4QIsa^{b} (4Q56): extant: verses 19-28

There is also a translation into Koine Greek known as the Septuagint, made in the last few centuries BCE. Extant ancient manuscripts of the Septuagint version include Codex Vaticanus (B; $\mathfrak{G}$^{B}; 4th century), Codex Sinaiticus (S; BHK: $\mathfrak{G}$^{S}; 4th century), Codex Alexandrinus (A; $\mathfrak{G}$^{A}; 5th century) and Codex Marchalianus (Q; $\mathfrak{G}$^{Q}; 6th century).

== Parashot ==
The parashah sections listed here are based on the Aleppo Codex. Isaiah 44 is a part of the Consolations (Isaiah 40–66). {P}: open parashah; {S}: closed parashah.

{P} 44:1-5 {P} 44:6-20 {S} 44:21-23 {S} 44:4-28 {P}

== Verse 1 ==
“Yet hear now, O Jacob My servant,

And Israel whom I have chosen. (NKJV)

Cross reference: Isaiah 42:1, Jeremiah 30:10

== Verse 2 ==
Thus saith the Lord that made thee,

and formed thee from the womb, which will help thee;

Fear not, O Jacob, my servant;

and thou, Jesurun, whom I have chosen.

The word Jesurun is used in the King James Version; most modern translations use the word Jeshurun.

== Verse 6 ==
"Thus saith the Lord, the King of Israel,

And his Redeemer, the Lord of hosts:

I am the First and I am the Last;

and beside Me there is no God.

Cross reference: Revelation 1:8:

“I am the Alpha and the Omega, the Beginning and the End,” says the Lord, “who is and who was and who is to come.

This verse contains the first clear statement of monotheism.

== Verses 9-20 ==
The process of manufacturing idols is "described in minute detail, showing what an expenditure of human strength and contrivance is involved in the production of these useless deities".

== Verses 21-28 ==
=== Verse 22 ===
I have blotted out, like a thick cloud, your transgressions, and like a cloud, your sins.

- "Blotted out": The impact of the past wrongdoing has now been removed completely.

=== Verse 28 ===
That saith of Cyrus, He is my shepherd,

and shall perform all my pleasure:

even saying to Jerusalem, Thou shalt be built;

and to the temple, Thy foundation shall be laid.

The mention of the deliverer of Israel, Cyrus by name in this verse (also in 45:1) becomes one of the main grounds for the theory of two Isaiahs.

== See also ==
- Alpha and Omega
- Cyrus the Great
- Related Bible parts: Psalm 23, Isaiah 40, Isaiah 43, Isaiah 45, Revelation 1

== Sources ==
- Coggins, R (2007). "22. Isaiah". In Barton, John; Muddiman, John (eds.). The Oxford Bible Commentary (first (paperback) ed.). Oxford University Press. pp. 433–486. ISBN 978-0199277186.
- Würthwein, Ernst (1995). The Text of the Old Testament. Translated by Rhodes, Erroll F. Grand Rapids, MI: Wm. B. Eerdmans. ISBN 0-8028-0788-7.
