= Holy Spirit in Judaism =

In Judaism, the holy spirit (Hebrew: רוח הקודש, Ruach Ha-Kodesh) is conceived of as the divine force, quality, and influence of God over the universe or over God's creatures, in given contexts.

== Hebrew Bible ==
=== "Holy spirit" ===
The term "holy spirit" appears three times in the Hebrew Bible:

- Psalm 51 refers to "Your holy spirit" (ruach kodshecha).
- Chapter 63 of the Isaiah refers twice to "His holy spirit" (ruach kodsho) in successive verses.

Psalm 51 contains a triple parallelism between different types of "spirit":

Fashion a pure heart for me, O God; create in me a steadfast spirit (רוּחַ נָכֹון). Do not cast me out of Your presence, or take Your holy spirit (רוּחַ קָדְשְׁךָ) away from me. Let me again rejoice in Your help; let a vigorous spirit (רוּחַ נְדִיבָה) sustain me.

=== "Spirit of God" ===
Variations of a similar term, "spirit of God", also appear in various places in the Hebrew Bible. The Hebrew noun ruacḥ (רוח) can refer to "breath", "wind", or some invisible moving force ("spirit").

The following are some examples of the word ruacḥ (in reference to God's "spirit") in the Hebrew scriptures:

- Genesis 1:2: "a wind from God sweeping over the water"
- 1 Samuel 16:13: "and the spirit of the LORD gripped David from that day on."
- Psalm 143:10: "Let Your gracious spirit lead me on level ground."
- Isaiah 42:1: "Behold My servant, I will support him, My chosen one, whom My soul desires; I have placed My spirit upon him, he shall promulgate justice to the nations."
- Isaiah 44:3: "So will I pour My spirit on your offspring, My blessing upon your posterity."
- Joel 2:28: "I will pour out My spirit on all flesh; Your sons and daughters shall prophesy."

== Rabbinic literature ==
The term ruach haqodesh is found frequently in talmudic and midrashic literature. In some cases it signifies prophetic inspiration, while in others it is used as a hypostatization or a metonym for God. The rabbinical understanding of the holy spirit has a certain degree of personification, but it remains, "a quality belonging to God, one of his attributes". The idea of God as a duality or trinity is shituf (polytheistic).

=== Nature ===
What the Bible generally calls "spirit of God" is called in the Talmud and Midrash "holy spirit" due to the disinclination to the use of the Tetragrammaton. It is probably owing to this fact that the Shekhinah is often referred to instead of the holy spirit. It is said of the former, as of the holy spirit, that it rests upon a person. The difference between the two in such cases has not yet been determined.

Although the holy spirit is often named instead of God, it was conceived as being something distinct. The spirit was among the ten things that were created on the first day. Though the nature of the holy spirit is really nowhere described, the name indicates that it was conceived as a kind of wind that became manifest through noise and light. As early as Ezekiel 3:12 it is stated, "the spirit took me up, and I heard behind me a voice of a great rushing," the expression "behind me" characterizing the unusual nature of the noise. The Shekhinah made a noise before Samson like a bell. When the holy spirit was resting upon him, his hair gave forth a sound like a bell, which could be heard from afar. It imbued him with such strength that he could uproot two mountains and rub them together like pebbles, and could cover leagues at one step.

Although the lights which accompanied the noise are not expressly mentioned, the frequently recurring phrase "he beheld (hetzitz be-) the holy spirit" suggests that he upon whom the spirit rested saw a light. The holy spirit gleamed in the court of Shem, of Samuel, and of King Solomon. It "glimmered" in Tamar (Genesis 38:18), in the sons of Jacob (Genesis 42:11), and in Moses (Exodus 2:12), i.e., it settled upon these individuals. Like everything that comes from heaven, the holy spirit is described as being composed of light and fire. When it rested upon Pinchas, his face burned like a torch.

From the day that Joseph was sold, the holy spirit left Jacob, who saw and heard only indistinctly. When the Temple was destroyed and Israel went into exile, the holy spirit returned to heaven; this is indicated in Ecclesiastes 12:7: "the spirit shall return unto God". The spirit talks sometimes with a masculine and sometimes with a feminine voice, as the word ruach is both masculine and feminine, the holy spirit was conceived as being sometimes a man and sometimes a woman.

=== Individuals possessing the holy spirit ===
The holy spirit dwells only among a worthy generation, and the frequency of its manifestations is proportionate to the worthiness. There was no manifestation of it in the time of the Second Temple, while there were many during the time of Elijah. According to Job 28:25, the holy spirit rested upon the Prophets in varying degrees, some prophesying to the extent of one book only, and others filling two books. Nor did it rest upon them continually, but only for a time. The stages of development, the highest of which is the holy spirit, are as follows: zeal, integrity, purity, holiness, humility, fear of sin, the holy spirit. The holy spirit conducts Elijah, who brings the dead to life. Pious individuals act through the holy spirit; whoever teaches the Torah in public partakes of the holy spirit. When Pinchas sinned the holy spirit departed from him. Abiathar was deposed from office as High Priest when he was deserted by the holy spirit without which the Urim and Thummim could not be consulted.

In Biblical times the holy spirit was widespread, resting on those who, according to the Bible, displayed a propitious activity; thus it rested on Eber and (according to Joshua 2:16) even on Rahab. It was necessary to reiterate frequently that Solomon wrote his three books (Proverbs, Song of Songs, and Ecclesiastes) under the inspiration of the holy spirit, because there was a continual opposition not only to the wise king personally, but also to his writings. A teacher of the Law says that probably for this reason the holy spirit rested upon Solomon in his old age only.

The holy spirit rested not only on the children of Israel who crossed the Red Sea, but, toward the end of the time of the Second Temple, occasionally on common people; for "if they are not prophets, they are at least the sons of prophets". The holy spirit is at times identified with the spirit of prophecy. Sifre remarks: "'I will put My words into his mouth,' means 'I put them into his mouth, but I do not speak with him face to face'; know, therefore, that henceforth the holy spirit is put into the mouths of the Prophets." The "knowledge of God" is the holy spirit. The division of the country by lot among the tribes was likewise effected by means of the holy spirit.

=== Works inspired by the holy spirit ===
The visible results of the activity of the holy spirit are the books of the Bible, all of which are believed (in Jewish tradition) to have been composed under its inspiration. All the Prophets spoke "in the holy spirit"; and the most characteristic sign of the presence of the holy spirit is the gift of prophecy, in the sense that the person upon whom it rests beholds the past and the future. With the death of the last three prophets (Haggai, Zechariah, and Malachi), the holy spirit ceased to manifest itself in Israel, and only the Bat Kol remained available to the sages. Although the holy spirit was not continually present, and did not rest for any length of time upon any individual, yet there were cases in which it appeared and made knowledge of the past and of the future possible.

Frequently, in rabbinical literature, a single Biblical verse is described as having been spoken by the holy spirit (for example, verses in which God speaks in the first person).

=== Non-Jews and the holy spirit ===
The opposite of the holy spirit is the impure spirit (ruach tum'ah; lit. "spirit of impurity"). The holy spirit rests on the person who seeks the Shekhinah, while the impure spirit rests upon him who seeks impurity. On the basis of II Kings 3:13, the statement is made (perhaps as a polemic against Jesus) that the holy spirit rests only upon a happy soul, although such a line of reasoning is problematic to explain the cases of Elijah, Jeremiah, among others, who certainly faced difficult circumstances. Among the pagans Balaam, from being a mere interpreter of dreams, rose to be a magician and then a possessor of the holy spirit. But the holy spirit did not appear to him except at night, all pagan prophets being in possession of their gift only then. The Torah includes the Balaam section in order to show why the holy spirit was taken from the non-Jew—i.e., because Balaam desired to destroy a whole people without cause. A very ancient source explains, based on Deuteronomy 18:15, that in the Holy Land the gift of prophecy is not granted to the non-Jew or in the interest of the non-Jew, nor is it given outside the Holy Land even to Jews. In the Messianic time, however, the holy spirit will (according to Joel 2:28–29) be poured out upon all Israel; i.e., all the people will be prophets. According to Tanna Devei Eliyahu the holy spirit will be poured out equally upon Jews and pagans, both men and women, freemen and slaves.

== Relationship to other Jewish concepts ==
The Shekhinah (Biblical Hebrew: שכינה šekīnah; also Romanized Shekina(h), Schechina(h), Shechina(h)) is the English transliteration of a Hebrew word meaning "dwelling" or "settling" and denotes the dwelling or settling of the divine presence of God. This term does not occur in the Bible, and is from rabbinic literature.

Rashi taught that quasi-Sefirah Da'at is ruach haQodesh.

== See also ==
- Biblical inspiration
- Holy Spirit, general article
  - Holy Spirit in Christianity
  - Holy Spirit (Christian denominational variations)
  - Holy Spirit in Islam
