= Isaiah 41 =

Book of Isaiah, chapter 41

- ← chapter 40 chapter 42 →
- The Great Isaiah Scroll, the best preserved of the biblical scrolls found at Qumran from the second century BC, contains all the verses in this chapter.
- Book: Book of Isaiah
- Hebrew Bible part: Nevi'im
- Order in the Hebrew part: 5
- Category: Latter Prophets
- Christian Bible part: Old Testament
- Order in the Christian part: 23

Isaiah 41 is the forty-first chapter of the Book of Isaiah in the Hebrew Bible or the Old Testament of the Christian Bible and the second chapter of the section known as "Deutero-Isaiah" (Isaiah 40–55), dating from the time of the Israelites' exile in Babylon. This book contains the prophecies attributed to the prophet Isaiah, and is one of the Books of the Prophets.

== Text ==
The original text was written in Hebrew language. This chapter is divided into 29 verses.

=== Textual witnesses ===
Some early manuscripts containing the text of this chapter in Hebrew are of the Masoretic Text tradition, which includes the Codex Cairensis (895), the Petersburg Codex of the Prophets (916), Aleppo Codex (10th century), Codex Leningradensis (1008).

Fragments containing parts of this chapter were found among the Dead Sea Scrolls (3rd century BC or later):

- 1QIsa^{a}: complete
- 1QIsa^{b}: extant: verses 4-27
- 4QIsa^{b} (4Q56): extant: verses 8-11
- 5Q^{3} (5QIsa): extant: verses 25

There is also a translation into Koine Greek known as the Septuagint, made in the last few centuries BCE. Extant ancient manuscripts of the Septuagint version include Codex Vaticanus (B; $\mathfrak{G}$^{B}; 4th century), Codex Sinaiticus (S; BHK: $\mathfrak{G}$^{S}; 4th century), Codex Alexandrinus (A; $\mathfrak{G}$^{A}; 5th century) and Codex Marchalianus (Q; $\mathfrak{G}$^{Q}; 6th century).

== Parashot ==
The parashah sections listed here are based on the Aleppo Codex. Isaiah 41 is a part of the Consolations (Isaiah 40–66). {P}: open parashah; {S}: closed parashah.

{S} 41:1-7 {S} 41:8-13 {S} 41:14-16 {S} 41:17-20 {P} 41:21-24 {P} 41:25-29 {P}

== Verse 2 ==
"Who has stirred up one from the east ...?"

J. Skinner, in the Cambridge Bible for Schools and Colleges, describes this reference as "unquestionably" pointing to Cyrus. The Amplified Bible and the Jerusalem Bible both specify Cyrus here. However, some Jewish exegetes have applied the verse to Abraham; Reformation theologian John Calvin makes the same connection:

[The prophet] mentions Abraham; for he might have enumerated other works of God, but selected an example appropriate to his subject; for ... Abraham, whom God had brought out of Chaldea ...

== Verse 10 ==
Fear thou not; for I am with thee: be not dismayed; for I am thy God:

I will strengthen thee; yea, I will help thee; yea, I will uphold thee with the right hand of my righteousness.

This verse has inspired many well-known hymns, among them:

- How Firm a Foundation
- The Right Hand of God
- Guide Me, O Thou Great Jehovah
- Just a Closer Walk with Thee

== Verse 13 ==
For I the Lord thy God will hold thy right hand, saying unto thee, Fear not; I will help thee.

This verse has inspired many well-known hymns, among them:

- Precious Lord, Take My Hand
- He Leadeth Me
- Lead Me, Guide Me

== Verse 14 ==
Do not be afraid, you worm Jacob

John Wycliffe's translation, "worm of Jacob", uses the appositive genitive syntax. There is no reference to the worm in the Septuagint version:

Fear not, Jacob, and thou Israel few in number.

== See also ==
- Christian messianic prophecies
- Messianic prophecies of Jesus
- Related Bible parts: Isaiah 40, Isaiah 42

== Bibliography ==
- Würthwein, Ernst (1995). The Text of the Old Testament. Translated by Rhodes, Erroll F. Grand Rapids, MI: Wm. B. Eerdmans. ISBN 0-8028-0788-7.
