= Isaiah 2 =

Book of Isaiah, chapter 2

- ← chapter 1 chapter 3 →
- The Great Isaiah Scroll, the best preserved of the biblical scrolls found at Qumran from the second century BC, contains all the verses in this chapter.
- Book: Book of Isaiah
- Hebrew Bible part: Nevi'im
- Order in the Hebrew part: 5
- Category: Latter Prophets
- Christian Bible part: Old Testament
- Order in the Christian part: 23

Isaiah 2 is the second chapter of the Book of Isaiah in the Hebrew Bible or the Old Testament of the Christian Bible. This book contains the prophecies attributed to the prophet Isaiah, and is one of the Books of the Prophets.

== Text ==
The original text was written in Hebrew language. This chapter is divided into 22 verses.

=== Textual witnesses ===
Some early manuscripts containing the text of this chapter in Hebrew are of the Masoretic Text tradition, which includes the Codex Cairensis (895), the Petersburg Codex of the Prophets (916), Aleppo Codex (10th century), Codex Leningradensis (1008).

Fragments containing parts of this chapter were found among the Dead Sea Scrolls (3rd century BC or later):

- 1QIsa^{a}: complete
- 4QIsa^{a} (4Q55): extant: verses 7-10
- 4QIsa^{b} (4Q56): extant: verses 3-16
- 4QIsa^{f} (4Q60): extant: verses 1-3
- 4QIsa^{l} (4Q65): extant: verses 1-4

There is also a translation into Koine Greek known as the Septuagint, made in the last few centuries BCE. Extant ancient manuscripts of the Septuagint version include Codex Vaticanus (B; $\mathfrak{G}$^{B}; 4th century), Codex Sinaiticus (S; BHK: $\mathfrak{G}$^{S}; 4th century), Codex Alexandrinus (A; $\mathfrak{G}$^{A}; 5th century) and Codex Marchalianus (Q; $\mathfrak{G}$^{Q}; 6th century).

=== Old Testament references ===
Micah 4:1–3 is very similar to Isaiah 2:2-4.

== Parashot ==
The parashah sections listed here are based on the Aleppo Codex. Isaiah 2 is a part of the Prophecies about Judah and Israel (Isaiah 1-12). {P}: open parashah.

{P} 2:1-4 {P} 2:5-11 {P} 2:12-22 {P}

== The mountain of the Lord's house (verses 1–4) ==
This part is the beginning of an oracle which comprises chapters 2-4, with the basic theme of the glorious future of Jerusalem. The oracle in these four verses bears a close similarity to Micah 4:1–3 but with a different conclusion.

=== Verse 1 ===
The word that Isaiah the son of Amoz saw concerning Judah and Jerusalem.

This new and "somewhat unexpected" superscription, inserted here, may serve to emphasize the originality of this prophecy as Isaiah's, as the subsequent words of oracle (verses 2–4) can also be found, with minor differences, in the Book of Micah; alternatively, it may be read as a sectional heading for chapters 2-12, comparable with the introductory line in Isaiah 13:1, which refers to a new oracle.

=== Verse 2 ===
And it shall come to pass in the last days, that the mountain of Jehovah's house shall be established in the top of the mountains, and shall be exalted above the hills; and all nations shall flow unto it.

Other translations refer to "the mountain of the LORD's temple. Richard Coggins comments that Mount Zion is "in fact not at all a spectacular mountain".

=== Verse 3 ===
And many people shall go and say, Come ye, and let us go up to the mountain of JEHOVAH, to the house of the God of Jacob; and he will teach us of his ways, and we will walk in his paths: for out of Zion shall go forth the law, and the word of JEHOVAH from Jerusalem.

- Cross reference: Isaiah 11:10; Isaiah 43:6; Isaiah 49:22; Isaiah 60:3; Isaiah 66:12

=== Verse 4 ===
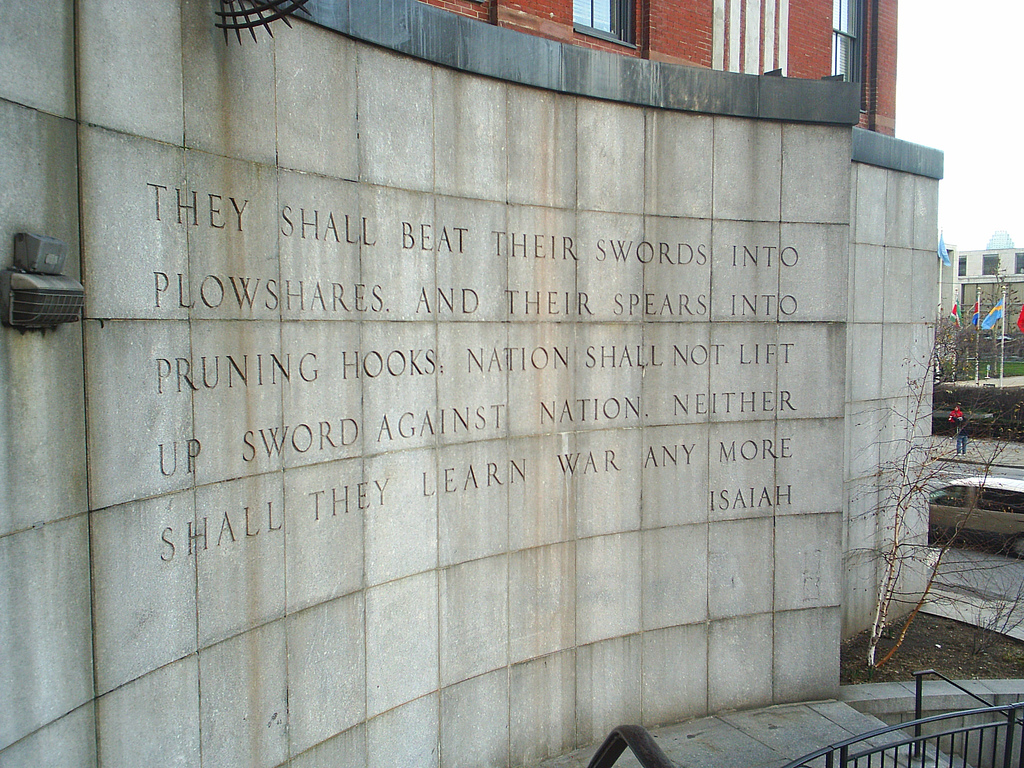
Bible verse Isaiah 2:4 (KJV) written on a wall across the street from the headquarters of the United Nations in New York City

And he shall judge among the nations, and shall rebuke many people: and they shall beat their swords into plowshares, and their spears into pruninghooks: nation shall not lift up sword against nation, neither shall they learn war any more.

- Cross reference: Micah 4:3

Many speeches and movements concerned with peace and the adaptation of military technology to peaceful uses have adopted the phrase "swords into plowshares". The verse is a reversal of Joel 3:10, where the ploughshares and pruning hooks are to become swords and spears, as it is related to 'the need for continued conflict'.

== The day of Jehovah (verses 5–22) ==
This section contains an oracle about "the day of Jehovah" which brings together two basic themes in the book of Isaiah: "the vanity of human self-confidence" and "the folly of worshipping false gods".

=== Verse 5 ===
O house of Jacob, come ye, and let us walk in the light of Jehovah.

The first part of this verse in Hebrew: "בית יעקב לכו ונלכה" Beit Ya'akov Lekhu Venelkha ("House of Jacob, let us go [up]") is the basis of the acronym "Bilu" (Hebrew בילו) which became the name of a nineteenth-century movement in Israel.

=== Verse 6 ===
Therefore thou hast forsaken thy people the house of Jacob, because they be replenished from the east, and are soothsayers like the Philistines, and they please themselves in the children of strangers.

- "They be replenished from the east" (King James Version) or "They are filled with eastern ways" (New King James Version): This phrase is rendered in the Revised Version as "they be filled with customs from the east", which is consistent with the following words:

... and of soothsayers like the Philistines.

This verse starts the actual new section, following verse 5 which is only linked by the phrase 'house of Jacob'.

=== Verse 22 ===
Cease ye from man, whose breath is in his nostrils: for wherein is he to be accounted of ?

The New King James Version renders this verse:

Sever yourselves from such a man, whose breath is in his nostrils; for of what account is he?

This verse is not found in the Septuagint, and could be a later insertion in Isaiah's prophecy.

== See also ==
- Christian messianic prophecies
- Guns into Plowshares
- Jewish messianism
- Messianic prophecies of Jesus
- Starry Plough (flag) or Plough flag
- Swords into ploughshares
- Related Bible parts: Isaiah 51, Micah 2, Micah 4, Ephesians 2

== Sources ==
- Coggins, R (2007). "22. Isaiah". In Barton, John; Muddiman, John (eds.). The Oxford Bible Commentary (first (paperback) ed.). Oxford University Press. pp. 433–486. ISBN 978-0199277186.
- Ulrich, Eugene, ed. (2010). The Biblical Qumran Scrolls: Transcriptions and Textual Variants. Brill. ISBN 9789004181830.
- Würthwein, Ernst (1995). The Text of the Old Testament. Translated by Rhodes, Erroll F. Grand Rapids, MI: Wm. B. Eerdmans. ISBN 0-8028-0788-7.
