= Vision (spirituality) =

Something seen in a dream, trance, or religious ecstasy

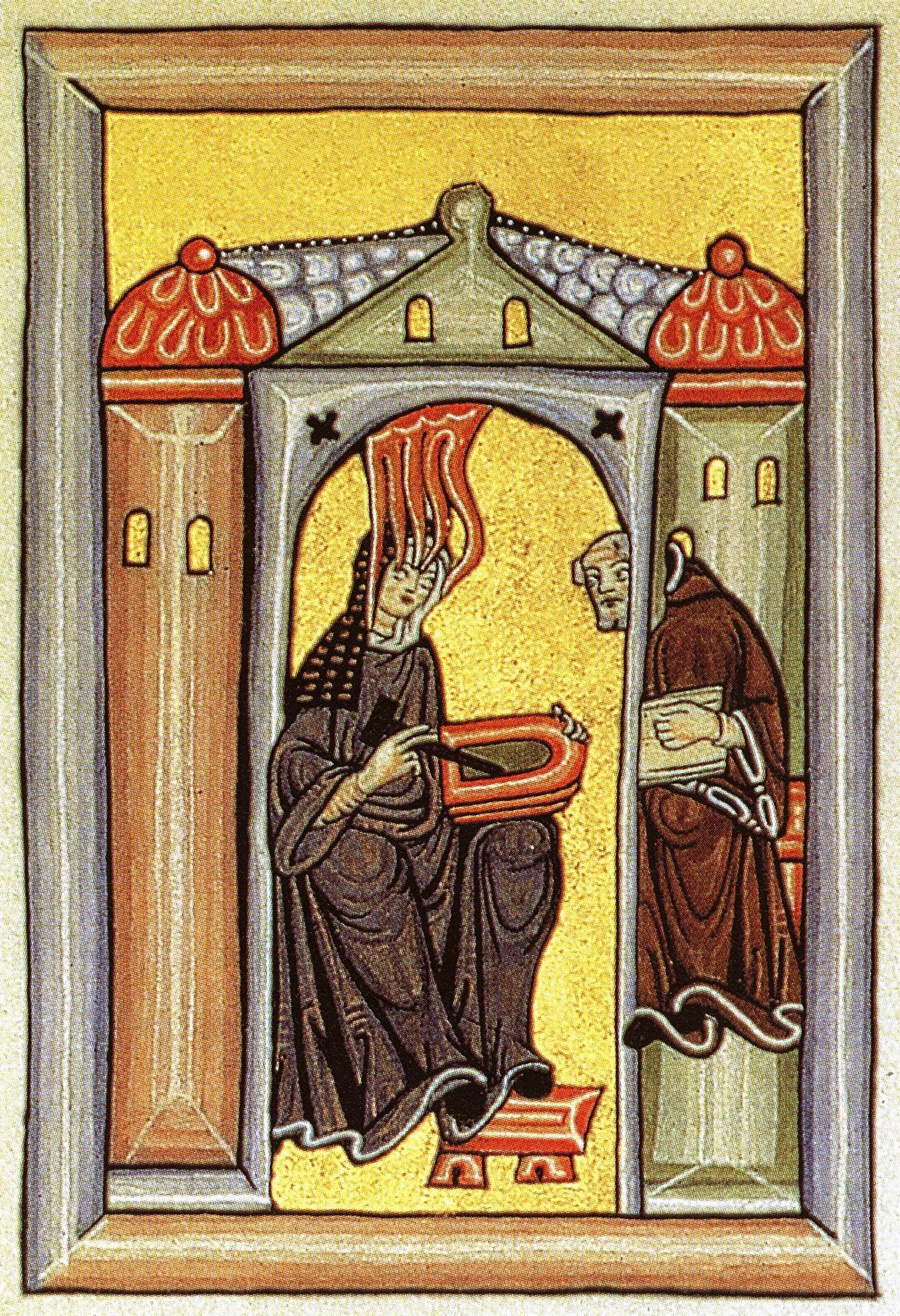
Illumination from Liber Scivias, showing Hildegard of Bingen receiving a vision, dictating to her scribe and sketching on a wax tablet

A vision is experienced in a dream, trance, or religious ecstasy, especially a supernatural appearance that conveys a revelation. Visions generally have more clarity than dreams, but fewer psychological connotations. Visions typically emerge from spiritual traditions and may provide a lens into human nature and reality. Prophecy is often associated with visions.

== Categories ==
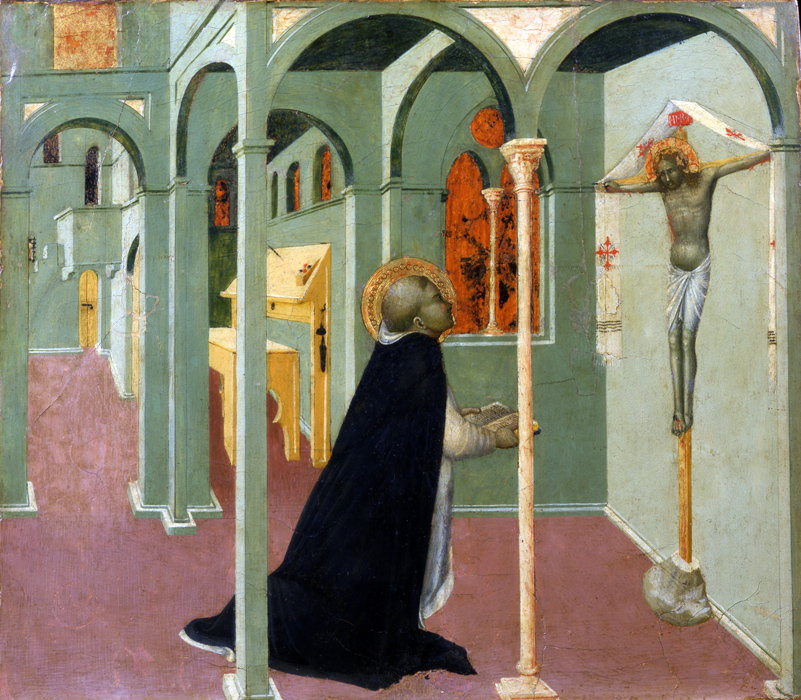
Vision of Thomas Aquinas in the Vatican Museum

Evelyn Underhill distinguishes and categorizes three types of visions:

1. Intellectual Visions – The Catholic dictionary defines these as supernatural knowledge in which the mind receives an extraordinary grasp of some revealed truth without the aid of sensible impressions, and mystics describe them as intuitions that leave a deep impression.
2. Imaginary – In Teresa of Avila's The Interior Castle, an imaginary vision is defined as one where nothing is seen or heard by the senses of seeing or hearing, but where the same impression is received that would be produced upon the imagination by the senses if some real object were perceived by them. Niels Christian Hvidt refers to them as visions recognized through mechanisms of the human psyche that are made up of things a soul has acquired through contact with reality.
3. Corporeal – A supernatural manifestation of an object to the eyes of the body. It may take place in two ways: either a figure really present strikes the retina and there determines the physical phenomenon of the vision, or an agent superior to man directly modifies the visual organ and produces in the composite a sensation equivalent to that which an external object would produce. Underhill refers to this vision type as "little else than an uncontrolled externalization of inward memories, thoughts, or intuitions"

== Examples ==
Visions listed in approximate chronological order, although some dates may be in dispute:

- The visions of Jeremiah in the first chapter of the Book of Jeremiah, where he sees a branch of an almond tree, and then "a boiling pot from the north".
- Vision of Isaiah in the first chapter of the Book of Isaiah, predicting the siege of Jerusalem and destruction of the first temple.
- Vision of God in the first chapter of the Book of Ezekiel (6th century BC)
- Vision of a heavenly figure "like a son of man" in Daniel 7:13 (6th century / 2nd century BC)
- Post-resurrection appearances of Jesus
- Paul the Apostle's vision of Jesus on the road to Damascus (1st century)
- Marian apparitions (visions or visitations of Mary, mother of Jesus) (1st century AD – present)
- Visions of the afterlife in the martyr accounts of Perpetua and Felicity (2nd century AD)
- Constantine's vision of Christ's sign (312 AD)
- Saint Fursey’s visions of angelic figures taking him through heaven and hell (7th century AD)
- Jakob Böhme's vision (1600 AD), in which he observed the beauty of a beam of sunlight in a pewter dish
- René Descartes' series of dreams on the night of 11 November 1619 set the course of his life in science
- Blaise Pascal's vision of 23 November 1654 reinvigorated his spiritual commitment
- Emanuel Swedenborg's visions formed the basis of a newly revealed doctrine (beginning in the 1740s)
- Joseph Smith's First Vision (1820), including Throne-Theophany of Lehi in the First Book of Nephi in 1 Nephi 1:8–11 (6th century BC)
- The Three Witnesses: Oliver Cowdery, David Whitmer and Martin Harris stated that they were shown the Book of Mormon's golden plates by an angel on 28 June 1829. They also reported hearing a voice from heaven declaring that they were translated miraculously. With over 150 documented statements, it is the most well-documented vision in history.
- Ramakrishna had several visions of religious figures including Kali, Sita, Krishna, Jesus, and Muhammed. (mid/late 19th century)
- Nat Turner's vision of 12 February 1831, in which he viewed an eclipse of the sun as a black man's hand covering the solar orb, interpreting it as a sign to launch his slave rebellion.

== See also ==
- Apparitional experience
- Beatific vision
- Divine embodiment
- Epiphany (feeling)
- Kashf
- Private revelation
- Theophany
- Vision quest
