= Isaiah 1 =

First chapter of the Book of Isaiah in the Hebrew Bible

- ← Song 8 chapter 2 →
- The Great Isaiah Scroll, the best preserved of the biblical scrolls found at Qumran from the second century BC, contains all the verses in this chapter.
- Book: Book of Isaiah
- Hebrew Bible part: Nevi'im
- Order in the Hebrew part: 5
- Category: Latter Prophets
- Christian Bible part: Old Testament
- Order in the Christian part: 23

Isaiah 1 is the first chapter of the Book of Isaiah, one of the Book of the Prophets in the Hebrew Bible and a book of the Old Testament of the Christian Bible. In this "vision of Isaiah concerning Judah and Jerusalem", the prophet calls the nation to repentance and predicts the destruction of Solomon's Temple in the 587 BCE siege of Jerusalem. This chapter provides an introduction to the issues of sin, judgement, and hoped-for restoration which form the overarching structure of the whole book. It concludes (verse 31) with "a reference to the burning of those who trust in their own strength", in a fire which cannot be "quenched" (Hebrew root: k-b-h), a relatively rare word which is also used in the last verse of the book (verse 66:24: "their fire shall not be quenched"), thereby linking together beginning and ending of this whole book. It is traditionally read on the Shabbat Chazon immediately preceding the Tisha B'Av (9th of Av) fast day.

== Text ==
The original text was written in Hebrew language. This chapter is divided into 31 verses.

=== Textual witnesses ===
Some early manuscripts containing the text of this chapter in Biblical Hebrew are of the Masoretic Text tradition, which includes the Codex Cairensis (895), the Petersburg Codex of the Prophets (916), Aleppo Codex (10th century), Codex Leningradensis (1008).

Fragments containing parts of this chapter were found among the Dead Sea Scrolls (3rd century BCE or later):

- 1QIsa^{a}: complete
- 4QIsa^{a} (4Q55): extant: verses 1‑3
- 4QIsa^{b} (4Q56): extant: verses 1‑6
- 4QIsa^{f} (4Q60): extant: verses 10‑16, 18‑31
- 4QIsa^{j} (4Q63): extant: verses 1‑6

There is also a translation into Koine Greek known as the Septuagint, made in the last few centuries BCE. Extant ancient manuscripts of the Septuagint version include Codex Vaticanus (B; $\mathfrak{G}$^{B}; 4th century), Codex Sinaiticus (S; BHK: $\mathfrak{G}$^{S}; 4th century), Codex Alexandrinus (A; $\mathfrak{G}$^{A}; 5th century) and Codex Marchalianus (Q; $\mathfrak{G}$^{Q}; 6th century).

== Parashot ==
The parashah sections listed here are based on the Aleppo Codex. Isaiah 1 is a part of the Prophecies about Judah and Israel (Isaiah 1-12). {P}: open parashah; {S}: closed parashah.

1:1-9 {P} 1:10-17 {S} 1:18-20 {P} 1:21-23 {S} 1:24-31 {P}

== Structure ==
The New King James Version organises this chapter as follows:

- Isaiah 1:1 = Subtitle or superscription: the vision of Isaiah
- Isaiah 1:2–20 = The Wickedness of Judah
- Isaiah 1:21–31 = The Degenerate City

== Superscription (1:1) ==
The vision of Isaiah the son of Amoz, which he saw concerning Judah and Jerusalem in the days of Uzziah, Jotham, Ahaz, and Hezekiah, kings of Judah.

This introductory verse of the Book of Isaiah is closely comparable to the opening verses of the books of Jeremiah, Hosea, Amos, Micah, and Zephaniah.

- "Vision" (Biblical Hebrew: חָזוֹן, romanized: chăzôn; from the verb חזה, châzâh, 'to see' or 'to behold'): Introducing the whole book as a vision in the title (see Obadiah 1, Nahum 1:1, Amos 1:1, Micah 1:1, & Habakkuk 1:1), as well as in 2 Chronicles 32:32: Now the rest of the acts of Hezekiah, and his goodness, behold they are written in the vision of Isaiah.
- "The son of Amoz": not of Amos the prophet. Jewish tradition has a note that Amoz, the father of Isaiah, was the brother of Amaziah of Judah, making Isaiah a member of the royal family.

According to the Christian Pulpit Commentary, the prophecies of Isaiah "concern primarily the kingdom of Judah, not that of Israel". This verse "is probably best understood as the heading of the first great collection of prophecies" in chapters 1-12. Chapter 13 initiates a proclamation against Babylon.

== The great accusation (1:2–4) ==
Isaiah calls the people of Judah "a thoughtless people".

=== Verse 2 ===
Hear, O heavens, and give ear, O earth;

for the LORD has spoken:

"Children have I reared and brought up,

but they have rebelled against me."

Isaiah's opening words recall those of Moses in Deuteronomy 32:1:

"Give ear, O heavens, and I will speak;
And hear, O earth, the words of my mouth.

It forms Isaiah's introduction in the style of the Song of Moses. The New Century Version combines these two exhortations into one:

Heaven and earth, listen, because the LORD is speaking.

=== Verse 3 ===
"The ox knows its owner,

and the donkey its master's crib,

but Israel does not know,

my people do not understand."

This verse has played an important part in Christian Christmas tradition, along with a number of other verses in Isaiah which are treated as pointing forward to the time of Jesus, and, although not mentioned in the gospels, "the ox and the donkey/ass" are often connected with accounts of the birth of Jesus. The animals in the Christmas crib are first mentioned in the New Testament apocryphal Gospel of Pseudo-Matthew (dated to the eighth or ninth century CE), where it is said that Mary, mother of Jesus "put her child in a manger, and an ox and an ass worshipped him. Then was fulfilled that which was spoken through the prophet Isaiah: 'The ox knows his owner and the ass his master's crib'".

== The devastation of Judah (1:5–9) ==
Isaiah uses images of the sick individual (verses 5–6) and the desolate nation (verses 7–8) to portray the sinfulness of his nation. The "daughter of Zion" (i.e., the city of Jerusalem) remained an isolated stronghold when Sennacherib, the king of Assyria, attacked the fortified cities of Judah in 701 BCE.

== Pious corruption and its cleansing (1:10–20) ==
Considered "the most powerful and sustained" prophetic outburst at religious unreality, (Note: See 1 Samuel 15:22; Jeremiah 7:21–23; Hosea 6:6; Amos 5:21–24; and Micah 6:6–8) the vehemence of this prophecy is built up together in its form and content. First, God rejected the offerings, then the offerers (verses 11–12), the specific accusation in the lurid conclusion of verse 15 ("Your hands are full of blood"), followed by the command to "have done with evil" in "eight thunderous calls", ending in the reminder of the life-and-death alternatives similar to Deuteronomy 30:15–20.

=== Verse 11 ===
I have had enough of burnt offerings of rams
And the fat of fed cattle.
I do not delight in the blood of bulls,
Or of lambs or goats.

Anglican bishop Robert Lowth translates the first portion of the verse as "I am cloyed with the burnt offerings of rams".

According to the Torah, burnt offerings formed a part of the required sacrifice on all great occasions, including Passover, the Feast of Weeks, at the Feast of Tabernacles, the Feast of Trumpets, and on Yom Kippur. They were commanded as the sole sacrifice for a trespass offering, too.

=== Verses 16–17 ===
Wash you, make you clean;
put away the evil of your doings from before mine eyes;
cease to do evil;
Learn to do well;
seek judgment, relieve the oppressed, judge the fatherless, plead for the widow.

=== Verse 18 ===
Come now, and let us reason together, saith the LORD:

though your sins be as scarlet, they shall be as white as snow;
though they be red like crimson, they shall be as wool.

The phrase "reason together" has a tone of "legal argument"; similar wording appears in Isaiah 43:26.

== God's lament and resolve (1:21–31) ==
The theme of this part is the vanished glory as in a funeral dirge, lamenting the moral loss of justice, but not concerning the wealth.

=== Verse 25 ===
[The Lord said:] "And I will turn my hand upon thee,

and purely purge away thy dross,
and take away all thy tin:

- "And purely purge away": "And will smelt away... as with lye" (ESV) or "and thoroughly 'refine with lye'".

=== Verse 26 ===
[The Lord said:] "And I will restore your judges as at the first,

and your counselors as at the beginning.

Afterward you shall be called the city of righteousness,

the faithful city."

The King James Version and American Standard Version translate שָׁפט (shaphat) as "judges"; the New International Version interprets it as "leaders."

=== Verses 29–31 ===
The Jerusalem Bible separates verses 29–31 as an oracle "against tree worship", suggesting that the prophet "possibly has Samaria in mind".

==== Verse 29 ====
For they shall be ashamed of the oaks which ye have desired, and ye shall be confounded for the gardens that ye have chosen.

- "Oaks", or "terebinths" (Pistacia palaestina), may refer to the "oaks" of Isaiah 57:5.
- "Which ye have desired" or "which give you such pleasure".

==== Verse 30 ====
For ye shall be as an oak whose leaf fadeth, and as a garden that hath no water.

- "Garden" may refer to the "gardens" in Isaiah 65:3.

==== Verse 31 ====
And the strong shall be as tow, and the maker of it as a spark, and they shall both burn together, and none shall quench them.

- "Quench": Illusion of a fire ("spark") which cannot be 'quenched', from the Hebrew root k-b-h (כָּבָה, kavah, 'to be quenched or extinguished, to go out'), links this verse (the beginning chapter) to the last verse (of the ending chapter) of the whole book (Isaiah 66:24; "their fire shall not be quenched). Moreover, it is also used in three other places: (1) of the servant in Isaiah 42:3, that "a dimly burning wick ('smoking flax') he will not quench"; (2) that the fire devouring Edom "will not be quenched"; and (3) in Isaiah 43:17 (those who oppose the LORD's path are "quenched like a wick").

== See also ==
- Ahaz
- Haazinu
- Hezekiah
- In the Bleak Midwinter
- Isaiah, son of Amoz
- Jerusalem
- Jotham
- Kingdom of Judah
- Nativity scene
- Sodom and Gomorrah
- Uzziah
- Zion
- Related Bible parts: Genesis 19, Deuteronomy 32, 2 Kings 18-21, Psalm 22, Romans 3, Romans 9

== Sources ==
- Coggins, R (2007). "22. Isaiah". In Barton, John; Muddiman, John (eds.). The Oxford Bible Commentary (first (paperback) ed.). Oxford University Press. pp. 433–486. ISBN 978-0199277186.
- Coogan, Michael David (2007). Coogan, Michael David; Brettler, Marc Zvi; Newsom, Carol Ann; Perkins, Pheme (eds.). The New Oxford Annotated Bible with the Apocryphal/Deuterocanonical Books: New Revised Standard Version, Issue 48 (Augmented 3rd ed.). Oxford University Press. ISBN 9780195288810.
- Kidner, Derek (1994). "Isaiah". In Carson, D. A.; France, R. T.; Motyer, J. A.; Wenham, G. J. (eds.). New Bible Commentary: 21st Century Edition (4, illustrated, reprint, revised ed.). Inter-Varsity Press. pp. 629–670. ISBN 9780851106489.
- Ulrich, Eugene, ed. (2010). The Biblical Qumran Scrolls: Transcriptions and Textual Variants. Brill.
- Würthwein, Ernst (1995). The Text of the Old Testament. Translated by Rhodes, Erroll F. Grand Rapids, MI: Wm. B. Eerdmans. ISBN 0-8028-0788-7.
