= Kreuz, auf das ich schaue =

1982 Christian hymn

- Christian hymn
- Written: 1982
- Text: by Eckart Bücken
- Language: German
- Based on: Isaiah 2:2-5
- Melody: by Lothar Graap
- Composed: 1982

"Kreuz, auf das ich schaue" (Cross that I look at) is a Christian hymn with words in German written by Eckart Bücken in 1982, with a melody by Lothar Graap. It appeared in Protestant and Catholic hymnals, and other songbooks.

== History ==
Eckart Bücken, a Protestant pastor, wrote the text of "Kreuz, auf das ich schaue" in 1982, reflecting the Cross. Lothar Graap composed a melody the same year.

The song became part of the Protestant hymnal Evangelisches Gesangbuch as EG 598, and of the Catholic hymnal Gotteslob as GL 270. It is also part of other songbooks.
