= Jeshurun =

Poetic name for Israel used in the Hebrew Bible

Jeshurun (Hebrew: יְשֻׁרוּן Yəšurūn) is a poetic name for Israel used in The Bible.

== Etymology ==
A hypocoristicon of the name Israel (יִשְׂרָאֵל Yiśrāʾēl). The vocalization of this name reflects the Phoenician Shift, so may be reborrowed from a dialect spoken by non-Israelite Canaanite speakers. From the Hebrew root י-שׂ-ר (*י-שׁ-ר in Phoenician) with hypocoristic suffix ון- replacing אֵל 'God'.

== Biblical accounts ==
Jeshurun appears four times in the Hebrew Bible: three times in Deuteronomy and once in Isaiah as a poetic name for Israel:

- 'But Jeshurun grew fat and kicked; you grew fat, you grew thick'. (Deuteronomy 32:15)
- 'Moses commanded a law for us, a heritage of the congregation of Jacob. He was King in Jeshurun, when the leaders of the people were gathered, all the tribes of Israel together'. (Deuteronomy 33:4–5)
- 'There is no one like the God of Jeshurun, who rides the heavens to help you'. (Deuteronomy 33:26)
- ‘Fear not, O Jacob My servant, and thou, Jeshurun, whom I have chosen'. (Isaiah 44:2).

The word Jeshurun may have a relationship to the same root as the Hebrew word meaning 'upright' or 'righteous', yashar. Numbers appears to use the word yashar (in its plural form yesharim) as a play on the word "Jeshurun" to refer to the people of Israel. (Numbers 23:10). Joshua 10:13 refers to a Book of Jasher (or Book of Jashar), translated in some versions as "the Book of the Upright".

== Classical interpretation ==
In the Midrash, Rabbi Berekiah in the name of Rabbi Simon interpreted Jeshurun to mean the Patriarch Israel. (Genesis Rabbah 77:1.) Similarly, Rabbi Berekiah in the name of Rabbi Judah b. Rabbi Simon interpreted Jeshurun as "the noblest and best among you." (Genesis Rabbah 77:1.)

Aha bar Jacob stated that the breastplate of the High Priest of Israel contained the Hebrew words "The tribes of Jeshurun," thus supplying the otherwise missing Hebrew letter teth in the word "Shivtei" ("tribes"). (See Babylonian Talmud, Yoma 73b for full explanation of "otherwise missing"; see also Exodus Rabbah 38:9.)

== Modern interpretation ==
The Reformer John Calvin reflected that "by using the word 'upright' for Israel, [the author] ironically taunts them with having departed from rectitude, and, reminding them of the high dignity conferred upon them, more severely reproves their sin of unfaithfulness".

Nineteenth century theologian Charles H. Waller argued that "Jeshurun is a diminutive—a term of endearment: either 'the child of the upright', or 'the beloved Israel'". He suggested that "the letters of the diminutive of Israel, if slightly abbreviated, would make 'Jeshurun'". However, Joseph Benson noted that "some consider the word as being derived from שׁור, shur, to see, and think the appellation was given them because they were so highly favoured with divine manifestations". Benson himself dismissed this view, suggesting that "it is much more probable that it is derived from ישׁר, jashar, to be right, upright, or righteous, and that they are called Jeshurun, because they were a people professing righteousness, and were governed by righteous laws".
