= Sela (Saudi Arabia) =

Hill in Saudi Arabia

- سلع; Mount Selaʾ
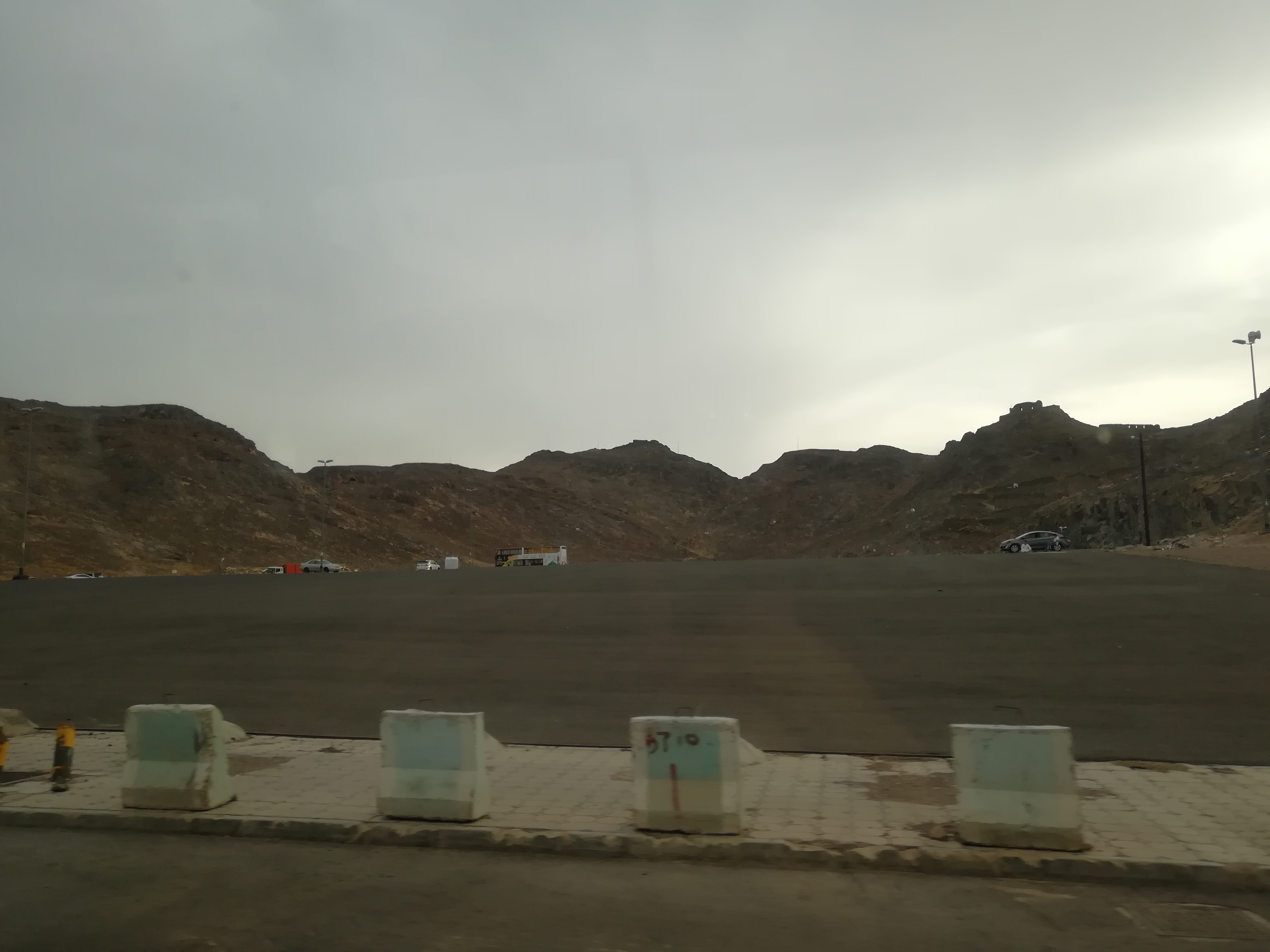

Highest point
- Coordinates: 24°28′30″N 39°35′58″E

Geography
- Location: Medina, Saudi Arabia

Selaʾ (Arabic: سلع) is a mountain in Medina in modern Saudi Arabia.

== Description ==
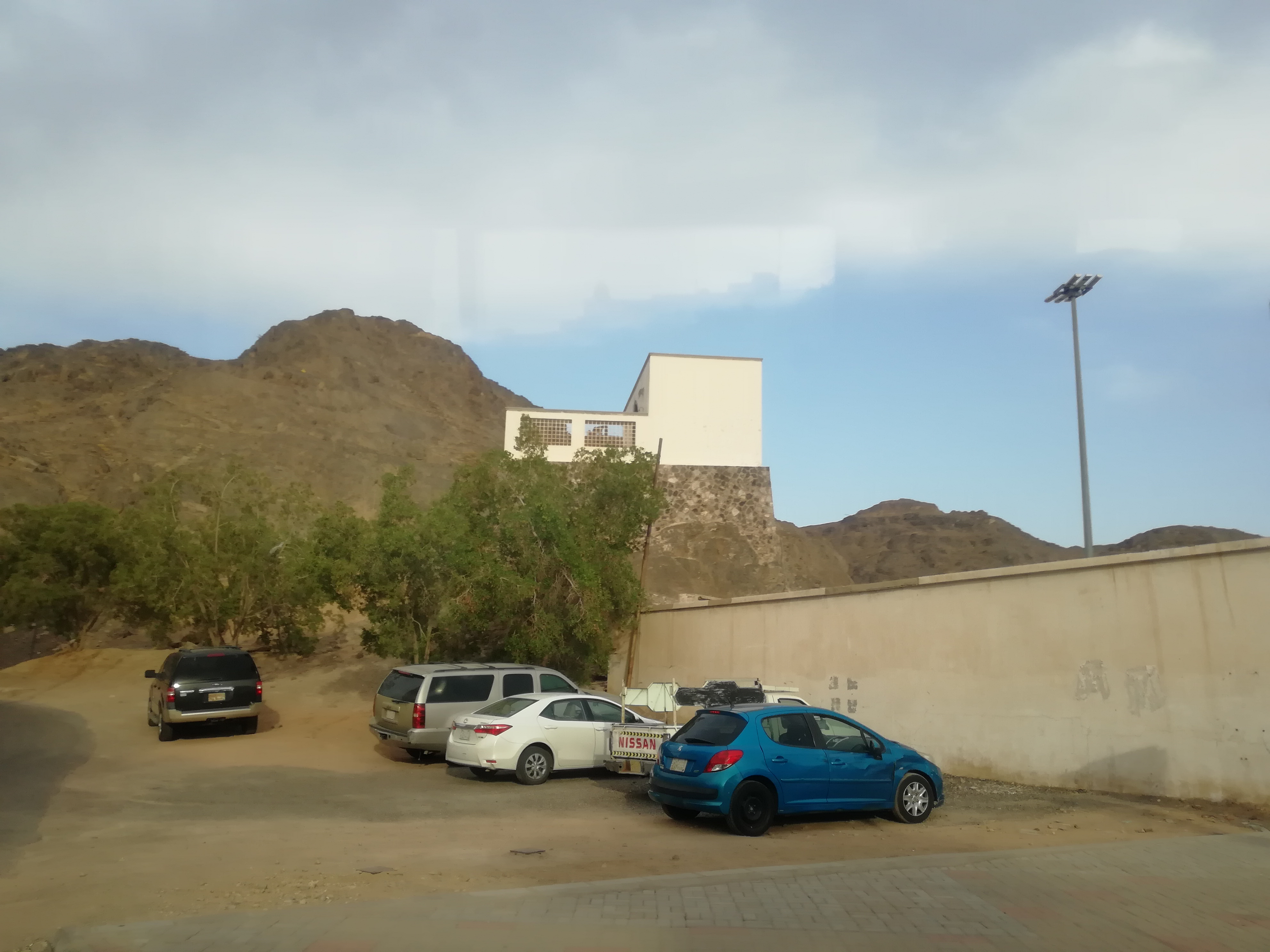
Jabal Sela and Fatah Mosque, in the area of the Seven Mosques in the Hejaz

Mount Selaʾ in the "District of the Seven Mosques" in city of Medina Municipality in Saudi Arabia. Sela means "sliced", because the mountain looks as if it is sliced several times.

The Islamic prophet Muhammad in the Battle of the Trench prayed to God for victory on Mount Sela. Mount Sela was mentioned in several Hadith of the stories of Muhammad such as The Prayer for Rain, The forgiveness of Kaʾb bin Mālik.

Sela is mentioned by al-Ḥamdāni in his book Geography of Arabian Peninsula as part of Medina city in his time 150 years after Muhammad. His name and the name of his companions Umar and Ali are inscribed on a stone on top of the mountain.

== See also ==
- Arabian Peninsula
  - Sarat Mountains
    - Hijaz Mountains
