= Isaiah 66 =

Book of Isaiah, chapter 66

- ← chapter 65 Jeremiah 1 →
- The Isaiah Scroll, the best preserved of the biblical scrolls found at Qumran from the second century BC, contains all the verses in this chapter.
- Book: Book of Isaiah
- Hebrew Bible part: Nevi'im
- Order in the Hebrew part: 5
- Category: Latter Prophets
- Christian Bible part: Old Testament
- Order in the Christian part: 23

Isaiah 66 is the sixty-sixth and final chapter of the Book of Isaiah in the Hebrew Bible or the Old Testament of the Christian Bible. This book contains the prophecies attributed to the prophet Isaiah, and is one of the Nevi'im. Chapters 56–66 are often referred to as Trito-Isaiah. This chapter contains an oracle delivered after the Second Temple had been built following the Babylonian captivity, and warns against "an unduly materialistic" approach to the worship of God.

== Text ==
The original text was written in Hebrew language. This chapter is divided into 24 verses.

=== Textual witnesses ===
Some early manuscripts containing the text of this chapter in Hebrew are of the Masoretic Text tradition, which includes the Codex Cairensis (895), the Petersburg Codex of the Prophets (916), Aleppo Codex (10th century), Codex Leningradensis (1008).

Fragments containing parts of this chapter were found among the Dead Sea Scrolls (3rd century BC or later):

- 1QIsa^{a}: complete
- 1QIsa^{b}: extant verses 1‑24
- 4QIsa^{b} (4Q56): extant verse 24
- 4QIsa^{c} (4Q57): extant verses 20‑24

There is also a translation into Koine Greek known as the Septuagint, made in the last few centuries BCE. Extant ancient manuscripts of the Septuagint version include Codex Vaticanus (B; $\mathfrak{G}$^{B}; 4th century), Codex Sinaiticus (S; BHK: $\mathfrak{G}$^{S}; 4th century), Codex Alexandrinus (A; $\mathfrak{G}$^{A}; 5th century) and Codex Marchalianus (Q; $\mathfrak{G}$^{Q}; 6th century).

== Parashot ==
The parashah sections listed here are based on the Aleppo Codex. Isaiah 66 is a part of the Consolations (Isaiah 40–66). {S}: closed parashah.

{S} 66:1-4 {S} 66:5-9 {S} 66:10-11 {S} 66:12-14 {S} 66:15-24 {end of book}

== Worshippers, welcome and unwelcome (66:1–5) ==
This part contains the rebuke to "ecclesiasticism" – 'the spirit that would build human walls around God' (verses 1–2a; cf. 2 Samuel 7:6–7; Acts 7:48–50, 54 and 'breed unreality' (verse 3) and 'intolerance' (verse 5). It is not a protest against the rebuilding of the temple, because it was the command of God (Haggai 1:2–11).

== The last intervention (66:6–17) ==
The focus of this section is the end time, where the nation ... brought forth in a moment (cf. 1 Corinthians 15:51–52) with a final divine intervention.

=== Verse 12 ===
For thus saith the LORD,

Behold, I will extend peace to her like a river, and the glory of the Gentiles like a flowing stream:
then shall ye suck, ye shall be borne upon her sides, and be dandled upon her knees.

- Cross reference for "glory of the Gentiles": Isaiah 2:3; Isaiah 11:10; Isaiah 43:6; Isaiah 49:22; Isaiah 60:3

=== Verse 17 ===
They that sanctify themselves and purify themselves to go unto the gardens, behind one in the midst,

eating swine's flesh, and the detestable thing, and the mouse,

shall be consumed together, saith the LORD.

The Jerusalem Bible describes this verse as "a fragment condemning pagan mysteries" linked with verses 3 and 4.

== The nations gathered in (66:18–24) ==
God states his purpose for the world to gather the nations (verse 18) with his means to carry it out into Jerusalem (verses 19–21), to witness the final glory and perdition. In Christian apocalyptic view, this can be connected to the first and second comings (or only the second coming) of Jesus Christ.

=== Verse 19 ===
And I will set a sign among them,

and I will send those that escape of them unto the nations,

to Tarshish, Pul, and Lud, that draw the bow,

to Tubal, and Javan, to the isles afar off,

that have not heard my fame, neither have seen my glory;

and they shall declare my glory among the Gentiles.

The names listed here represent the distant outposts of the world as it was known to Israel at the time. All five locations, Tarshish, Pul (or Put), Lud, Tubal, and Javan, are also mentioned in Ezekiel 27.

=== Verse 24 ===
And they shall go forth,

and look upon the carcases of the men that have transgressed against me:

for their worm shall not die,

neither shall their fire be quenched;

and they shall be an abhorring unto all flesh.

This is virtually the only passage to speak of lasting judgment, and comparable to "hell", which is described by Jesus as the place "where their worm does not die and the fire is not quenched" in Mark 9:48.

- "Quench": Illusion of a fire which cannot be 'quenched', from the Hebrew root: k-b-h (כבה, kabah, "to be quenched or extinguished, to go out"), links this verse (the last verse of the ending chapter) to the last verse of the beginning chapter of the whole book (Isaiah 1:31: "none shall quench"). Moreover, it is also used in three other places: (1) of the servant in Isaiah 42:3, that "a dimly burning wick ('smoking flax') he will not quench"; (2) that 'the fire devouring Edom "will not be quenched"' (34:10), and (3) 'those who oppose the LORD's path are "quenched like a wick"' (43:17).

== See also ==
- Javan
- Lud
- Mothering Sunday#Mediaeval origin
- Pul
- Tarshish
- Tubal
- Related Bible parts: Mark 9, Revelation 20

== Sources ==
- Coggins, R. (2007). "22. Isaiah". In Barton, John; Muddiman, John (eds.). The Oxford Bible Commentary (first (paperback) ed.). Oxford University Press. pp. 433–486. ISBN 978-0199277186.
- Kidner, Derek (1994). "Isaiah". In Carson, D. A.; France, R. T.; Motyer, J. A.; Wenham, G. J. (eds.). New Bible Commentary: 21st Century Edition (4, illustrated, reprint, revised ed.). Inter-Varsity Press. pp. 629–670. ISBN 9780851106489.
- Würthwein, Ernst (1995). The Text of the Old Testament. Translated by Rhodes, Erroll F. Grand Rapids, MI: Wm. B. Eerdmans. ISBN 0-8028-0788-7.
