= Isaiah 40 =

Book of Isaiah, chapter 40

- ← chapter 39 chapter 41 →
- The Great Isaiah Scroll, the best preserved of the biblical scrolls found at Qumran from the second century BC, contains all the verses in this chapter.
- Book: Book of Isaiah
- Hebrew Bible part: Nevi'im
- Order in the Hebrew part: 5
- Category: Latter Prophets
- Christian Bible part: Old Testament
- Order in the Christian part: 23

Isaiah 40 is the fortieth chapter of the Book of Isaiah in the Hebrew Bible, and the first chapter of the section known as "Deutero-Isaiah" (Isaiah 40-55), dating from the time of the Israelites' exile in Babylon. This book contains the prophecies attributed to the prophet Isaiah, and is one of the Books of the Prophets in the Tanakh (Hebrew Bible). Parts of this chapter are cited in all four canonical Gospels of the Christian Bible.

== Text ==
The original text was written in Hebrew language. This chapter is divided into 31 verses.

=== Textual witnesses ===
Some early manuscripts containing the text of this chapter in Hebrew are of the Masoretic Text tradition, which includes the Codex Cairensis (895), the Petersburg Codex of the Prophets (916), Aleppo Codex (10th century), Codex Leningradensis (1008).

Fragments containing parts of this chapter were found among the Dead Sea Scrolls (3rd century BC or later):

- 1QIsa^{a}: complete
- 1QIsa^{b}: extant verses 1-4
- 4QIsa^{b} (4Q56): extant verses 1‑4, 22‑26
- 5Q^{3} (5QIsa): extant verses 16, 18‑19

There is also a translation into Koine Greek known as the Septuagint, made in the last few centuries BCE. Extant ancient manuscripts of the Septuagint version include Codex Vaticanus (B; $\mathfrak{G}$^{B}; 4th century), Codex Sinaiticus (S; BHK: $\mathfrak{G}$^{S}; 4th century), Codex Alexandrinus (A; $\mathfrak{G}$^{A}; 5th century) and Codex Marchalianus (Q; $\mathfrak{G}$^{Q}; 6th century).

=== New Testament references ===
- Isaiah 40:1–5: Matthew 3:1–12; Mark 1:1–8; Luke 3:1–20; John 1:19–28
- Isaiah 40:6–8: 1 Peter 1:22–25
- Isaiah 40:9–31: Romans 11:33–36

== Parashot ==
The parashah sections listed here are based on the Aleppo Codex. Isaiah 40 is a part of the Consolations (Isaiah 40–66). {P}: open parashah; {S}: closed parashah.

{P} 40:1-2 {S} 40:3-5 {P} 40:6-8 {S} 40:9-11 {S} 40:12-16 {P} 40:17-20 {S} 40:21-24 {S} 40:25-26 {S} 40:27-31 {S}

== Structure ==
John Skinner, in the Cambridge Bible for Schools and Colleges commentary, refers to verses 1-11 as the prologue (to Deutero-Isaiah).

== Prepare the Way for the LORD (40:1–5) ==
=== Verse 1 ===
Comfort,

comfort my people,
says your God.

- "Your": The pronominal suffix is second masculine plural, may refer to "God’s people" or "unidentified heralds commanded to comfort Jerusalem".

=== Verse 2 ===
Speak tenderly to Jerusalem, and cry to her

that her warfare is ended,

that her iniquity is pardoned,

that she has received from the Lord's hand

double for all her sins.

In the Septuagint this passage is addressed to the priests.

=== Verse 3 ===
The voice of him that crieth in the wilderness, Prepare ye the way of the Lord, make straight in the desert a highway for our God.

This verse is cited in all four gospels in New Testament as fulfilled in the person of John the Baptist, who prepared for the coming of Jesus Christ the Lord (Matthew 3:1–3; Mark 1:2–5; Luke 3:2–6; John 1:23). John himself confessed that the verse pertains to him:

He [John the Baptist] said, "I am the voice of one crying out in the wilderness, 'Make straight the way of the Lord,' as the prophet Isaiah said".

Some English translations associate the reference to "the wilderness" with "the voice which cries out": examples include the King James Version and New King James Version, the Geneva Bible, Wycliffe's translation, the Darby Bible and Brenton's translation of the Septuagint. In more recent translations, "the wilderness" is associated with the place where the way of the Lord is to be prepared: examples include the ASV, Common English Bible, Contemporary English Version, English Standard Version, Jerusalem Bible, Revised Standard Version and New Revised Standard Version:

A voice cries:

"In the wilderness prepare the way of the Lord".

=== Verse 4 ===
Every valley shall be exalted, and every mountain and hill shall be made low: and the crooked shall be made straight, and the rough places plain:

Cited in Luke 3:5.

=== Verse 5 ===
And the glory of the Lord shall be revealed, and all flesh shall see it together:
for the mouth of the Lord hath spoken it.

Cited in Luke 3:6.

== The Enduring Word (40:6–8) ==
=== Verse 6 ===
The voice said, Cry.

And he said, What shall I cry?

All flesh is grass,

and all the goodliness thereof is as the flower of the field:

- "All flesh is grass" (Hebrew: כל־הבשר חציר kāl-ha-bā-shār khā-tsîr compare to Isaiah 37:27 and see also Job 5:25; Psalm 90:5; Psalm 92:7; Psalm 103:15. is answering the question, "What shall I cry?" (also see Job 8:12; Job 14:2; Psalm 37:2).

Cited in 1 Peter 1:24.

=== Verse 7 ===
The grass withers, the flower fades

because the Spirit of the Lord blows upon it;
surely the people are grass.

- "Spirit of the Lord": can also rendered as "wind of Jehovah" (Psalm 103:16) or may refer to the "withering east wind of those countries sent by Jehovah" (Jonah 4:8).

=== Verse 8 ===
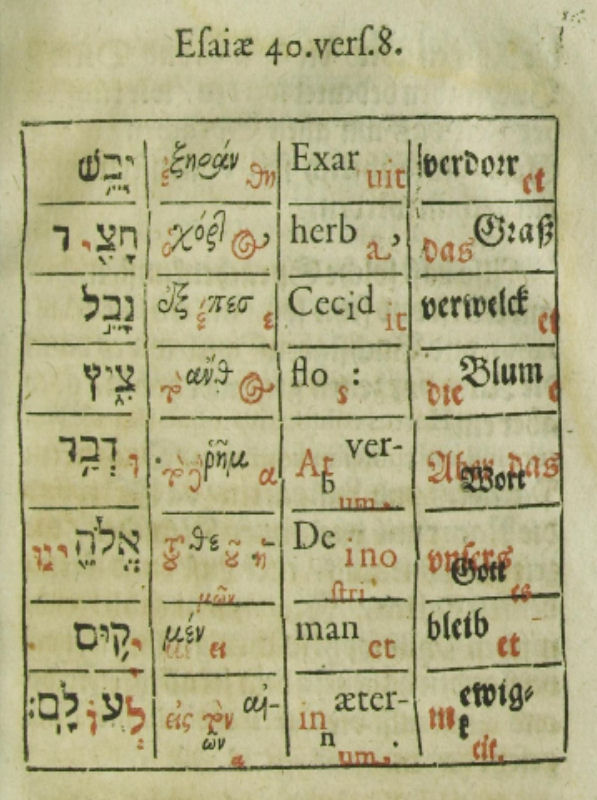
Isaiah 40:8 in Hebrew, Greek, Latin and German, with the verse analysed word-by-word (from Elias Hutter, 1602).

The grass withers, the flower fades,

but the word of our God shall stand forever.

Cited together with Isaiah 40:6 in 1 Peter 1:24–25.

== Here Is Your God! (40:9–31) ==
=== Verse 13 ===
Who has directed the Spirit of the Lord,

Or as His counselor has taught Him?

- Cross reference: Jeremiah 23:18
- Cited in Romans 11:34

=== Verse 22 ===
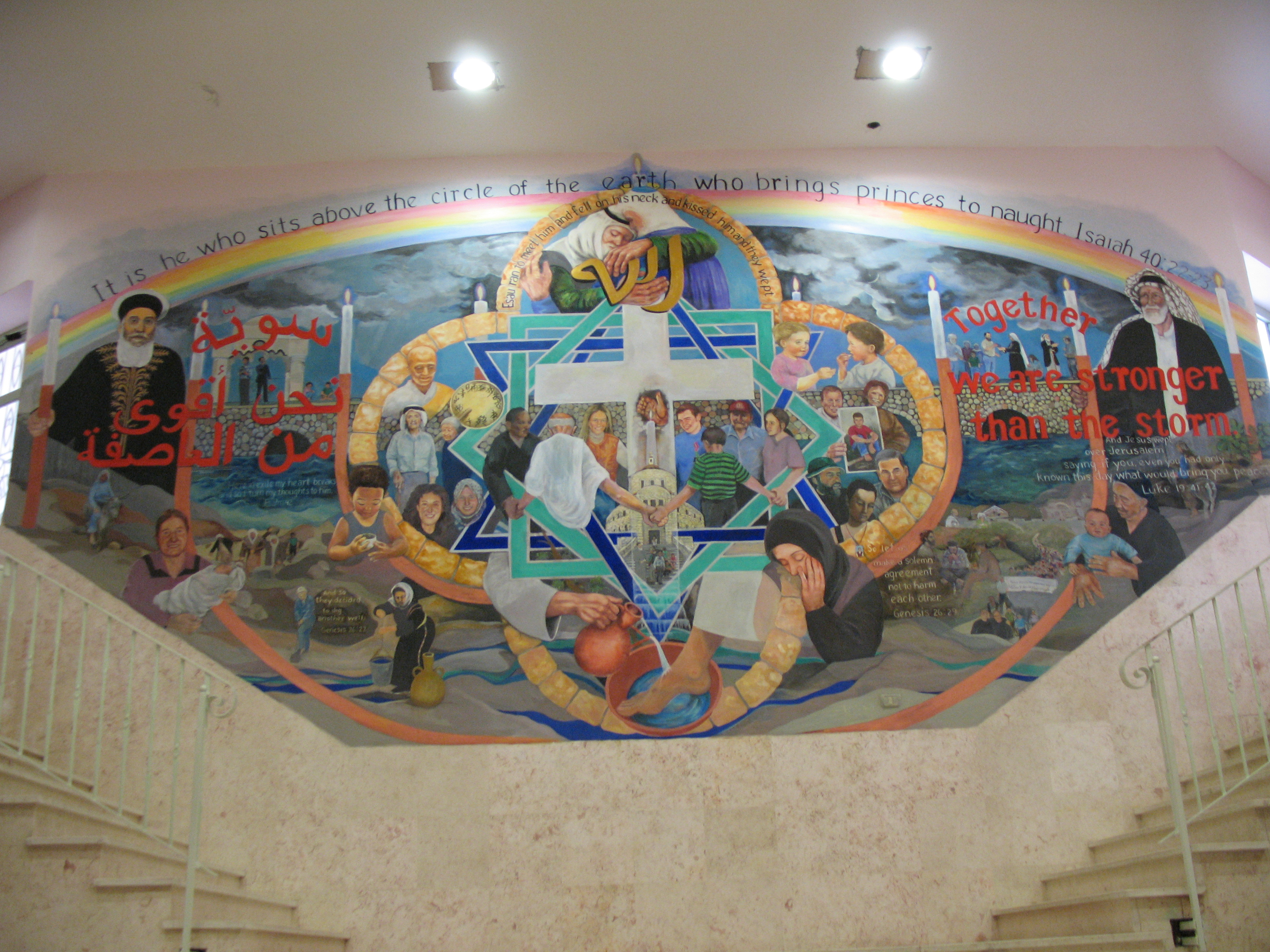
Mural in Church of the Sermon on the Mount (on the campus of Mar Elias Educational) with the text from Isaiah 40:22 by Dianne Roe.

It is he who sits above the circle of the earth,

and its inhabitants are like grasshoppers;

who stretches out the heavens like a curtain,

and spreads them like a tent to dwell in;

Westermann notes the similarity of parts of this verse to other Bible verses: verse 22a vs. Job 34:13b and verse 22b vs. Psalm 104:2b. This verse contains several rare words – such as דֹּק֙, doq ("curtain"), and מָתַח, mathach ("spread, stretch"), which are only found here, as well as ח֣וּג, chug ("circle"), which are only found in a few other verses (Proverbs 8:27; Job 22:14; Job 26:10) – suggesting "well-defined, distinctive traditions."

- "Circle" (of the earth): is translated from the Hebrew word חוּג, chug, which also denotes "horizon, circuit, vault of the heavens"; while the Gesenius Lexicon also adds "sphere". (Note: "a circle, sphere, used of the arch or vault of the sky.") It can refer to
  - the full circuit – the seen and unseen halves – of the stars across the dome of the sky, or
  - the vault of heaven (Job 22:14) extending "in a half-circle from horizon to horizon", or
  - a circular observable horizon (cf. Proverbs 8:27; Job 26:10)

It is to emphasize the range of God’s authority "over everything the eye can see in every direction, even to the distant ends of the earth," but not necessarily refer to the "circular nature of the earth."
Rashi mentions an expression with the same root in Isaiah 44:13 "and with a compass (וּבַמְּחוּגָה)" to view this word as a "circle" (as made by a compass). A newer edition of the Douay–Rheims Bible renders it as "globe" – and so does the Spanish version of the Jubilee Bible (el globo, although the English version renders as "circle") – but an older edition of the Douay-Reims renders it as "compasse" (original spelling in 1582 CE).

== Uses ==
=== Modern literature ===
A part of the Hebrew text of Isaiah 40:4 was used by Shmuel Yosef Agnon as the title for his 1912-novella, "Vehaya Ha'akov Lemishor" ("The Crooked Shall Be Made Straight").

=== Music ===
The King James Version of verses 1–5, 9 and 11 from this chapter is cited as texts in the English-language oratorio "Messiah" by George Frideric Handel (HWV 56).

== See also ==
- All flesh is grass
- Christian messianic prophecies
- John the Baptist
- Messianic prophecies of Jesus
- Related Bible parts: Exodus 19, Jeremiah 23, Matthew 3, Mark 1, Luke 3, John 1, Romans 11, 1 Peter 1, 1 Peter 5

== Sources ==
- Brown, Francis; Briggs, Charles A.; Driver, S. R. (1994). The Brown-Driver-Briggs Hebrew and English Lexicon (reprint ed.). Hendrickson Publishers. ISBN 978-1565632066.
- Gesenius, H. W. F. (1979). Gesenius' Hebrew and Chaldee Lexicon to the Old Testament Scriptures: Numerically Coded to Strong's Exhaustive Concordance, with an English Index. Translated by Tregelles, Samuel Prideaux (7th ed.). Baker Book House.
- Oswalt, John (1998). The Book of Isaiah, Chapters 40-66. (Volume 2 of The Book of Isaiah). New International Commentary on the Old Testament. Vol. 23. Wm. B. Eerdmans Publishing. ISBN 9780802825346.
- Smith, Gary V. (2009). Isaiah 40-66. New American commentary. Vol. 15. B&H Publishing Group. ISBN 9780805401448.
- Westermann, Claus (1969). Isaiah 40-66. Old Testament Library. Westminster John Knox Press. ISBN 9780664226459.
- Würthwein, Ernst (1995). The Text of the Old Testament. Translated by Rhodes, Erroll F. Grand Rapids, MI: Wm. B. Eerdmans. ISBN 0-8028-0788-7.
