= Codex Babylonicus Petropolitanus =

Masoretic manuscript of Hebrew Bible

Codex Babylonicus Petropolitanus (or The Petersburg Codex of the Prophets), designated by V^{p}, is an old Masoretic manuscript of Hebrew Bible, especially the Latter Prophets, using Babylonian vocalization. This codex contains the books of Isaiah, Jeremiah, Ezekiel, and the Minor Prophets, with both the small and the large Masora.

== Description ==
The codex consists of 225 folios, with each folio divided lengthwise into two columns with 21 lines in each column, except in folio 1a and folio 224a-b, which exhibit epigraphs. Two lines of Masorah Magna are placed in the lower margin of each page, whereas the Masorah Parva appear in the center space between the columns. The vowel-points are superlinear following the so-called Babylonian system.

The characters are square, written with a reed using 'thick and shiny' ink. The left side of a column is irregular, as the scribe didn't use elongated letters. The scribe provides the verse divisions using two perpendicular dots.

It was discovered in 1839 by Abraham Firkowitsch, who claimed to find it in the synagogue of Chufut-Kale in the Crimea. It is currently housed at the National Library of Russia in Saint Petersburg.

The date of the manuscript (A.D. 916) appears in the colophon. This manuscript is valuable not only due to its age (as one of the oldest Hebrew Bible manuscripts), but also because it is an important witness to the Babylonian pointing system, which was unknown to scholars for centuries until its discovery. Comparative studies with contemporary manuscripts showed that the codex uses the Eastern signs yet actually "follows the Western tradition in its consonantal text and its pointing." It is first published by H. L. Strack in 1876 (in a facsimile edition) and annotated for print editions, among others, in 1971 (hardcover).

== See also ==
- Aleppo Codex
- Codex Cairensis
- Leningrad Codex
- List of Hebrew Bible manuscripts
