= Codex Marchalianus =

6th-century Greek manuscript

The inter-relationship between various significant ancient manuscripts of the Old Testament. LXX denotes the original Septuagint.

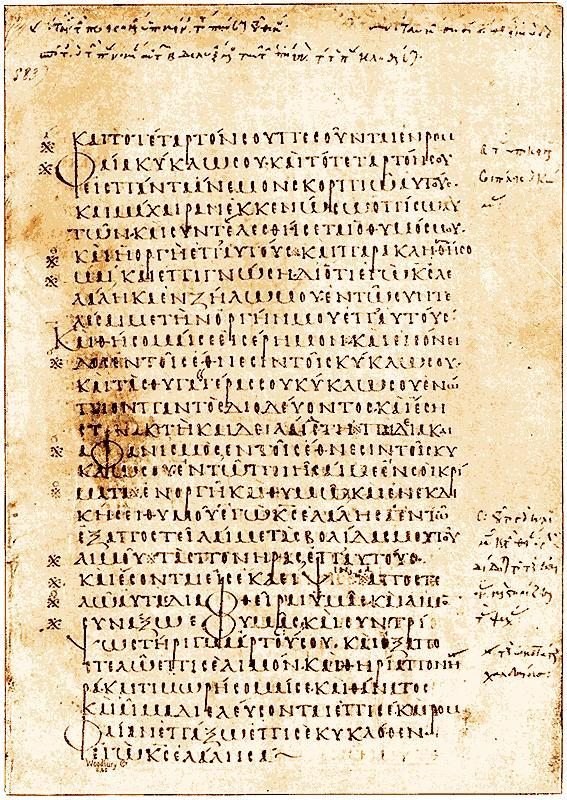
Page of the codex with text of Ezek 5:12–17

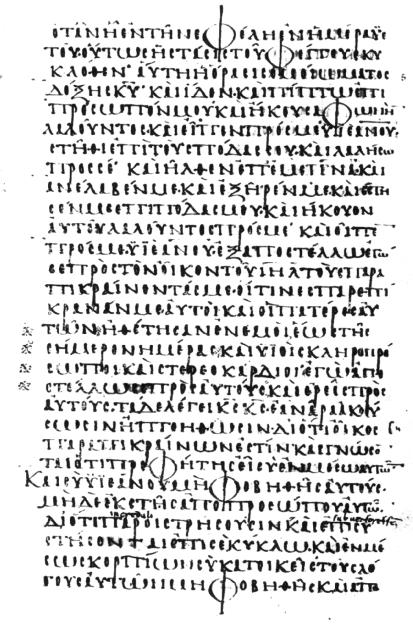
Folio 283 of the codex with text of Ezek 1:28–2:6

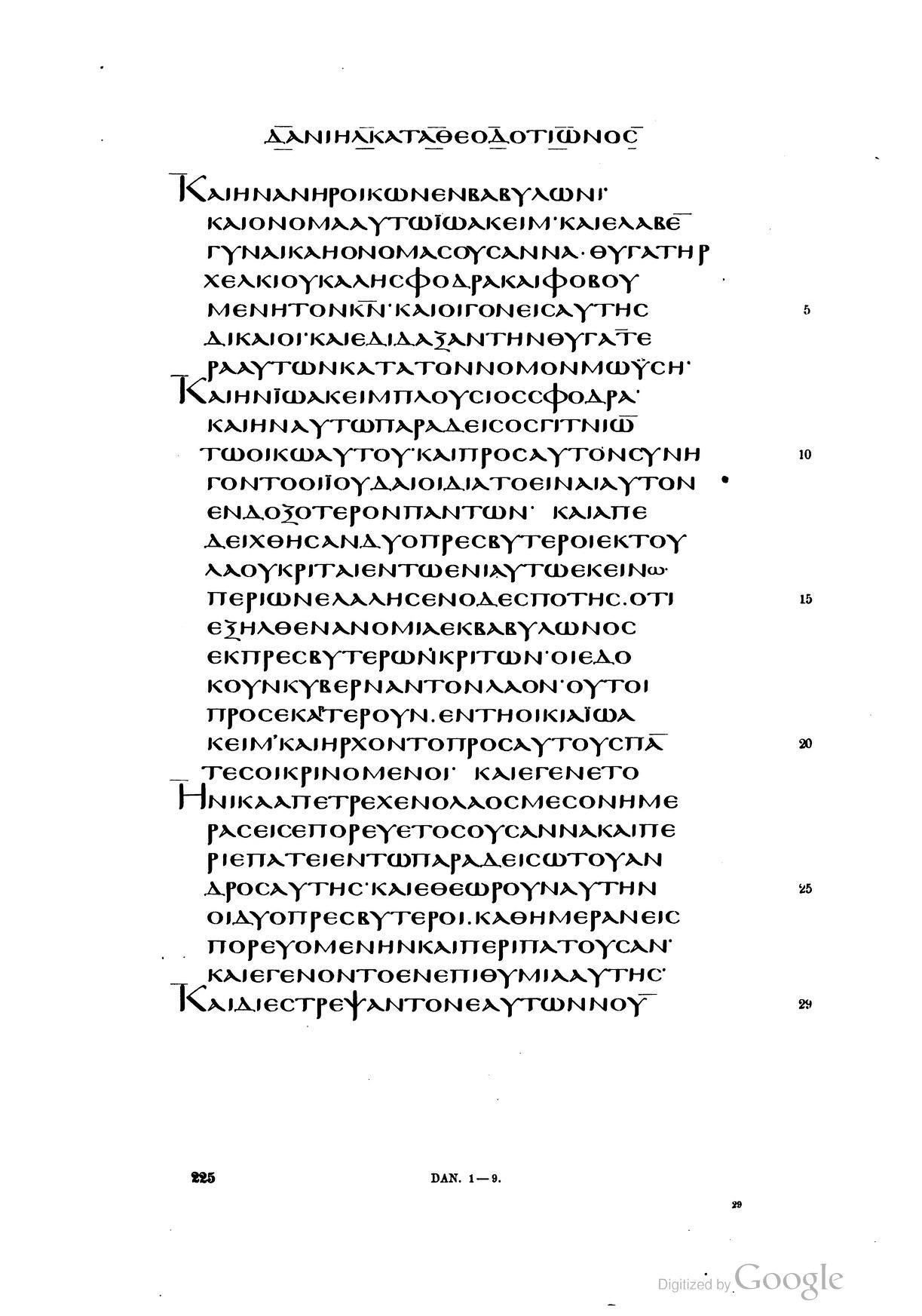
Daniel 1–9 in Tischendorf's facsimile edition (1869)

Codex Marchalianus, designated by siglum Q, is a 6th-century Greek manuscript copy of the Greek version of the Hebrew Bible (Tanakh or Old Testament) known as the Septuagint. It is now in the Vatican Library. The text was written on vellum in uncial letters. Palaeographically it has been assigned to the 6th century. Marginal annotations were later added to the copy of the Scripture text, the early ones being of importance for a study of the history of the Septuagint.

Its name was derived from a former owner, René Marchal.

== Description ==
The manuscript is an in quarto volume, arranged in quires of five sheets or ten leaves each, like Codex Vaticanus or Codex Rossanensis. It contains text of the Twelve Prophets, Book of Isaiah, Book of Jeremiah with Baruch, Lamentations, Epistle of Jeremiah, Book of Ezekiel, Book of Daniel, with Susanna and Bel. The order of the 12 Prophets is unusual: Hosea, Amos, Micah, Joel, Obadiah, Jonah, Nahum, Habakkuk, Zephaniah, Haggai, Zechariah, and Malachi. The order of books is the same as in Codex Vaticanus. The Book of Daniel represents the Theodotion version.

In its present state, the manuscript consists of 416 parchment leaves, but the first twelve contain patristic matter, and did not form a part of the original manuscript. The leaves measure 11 x 7 inches (29 x 18 cm). The writing is in one column per page, 29 lines per column, and 24–30 letters in line. It is written in bold uncial of the so-called Coptic style.

In the first half of the 19th century it was thought to be one of the oldest manuscripts of the Septuagint. It is generally agreed that Codex Marchalianus belongs to a well-defined textual family with Hesychian characteristics, a representative of the Hesychian recension (along with the manuscripts A, 26, 86, 106, 198, 233).

== Marginal notes ==
Some notes were added in the margins of the manuscript's Septuagint text in 6th-century uncial letters, some of them added quite soon by the same scribe who wrote the patristic material now placed at the beginning of the manuscript, but many are in a minuscule script, perhaps as late as the 13 century, which led Swete to classify the manuscript as of the 12th century. Images of pages with early notes in uncials of smaller size and of the much more abundant medieval notes in minuscules can in seen in an article by Marieke Dhont.

The marginal notes indicate Hexaplaric corrections of the Hesychian text

In the margins of Ezekiel and Lamentations they add about seventy items of an onomasticon. In their comment on the two verses Ezekiel 1:2 and 11:1, they use Ιαω, a phonetic transliteration into Greek letters of Hebrew יהוה, as an indirect reference to the Tetragrammaton. Several other marginal notes, not the text itself, give ΠΙΠΙ in the same way.

In Isaiah 45:18 Codex Marchalianus has Ἐγώ εἰμι, ("I am"), as does the Greek Septuagint in general. In the margin, this text was "corrected" to "I am the Lord", adding Κύριος ("the Lord") and making it conform to the Masoretic Text אני יהוה.

== History of the codex ==
The manuscript was written in Egypt not later than the 6th century. It seems to have remained there till the ninth, since the uncial corrections and annotations as well as text exhibit letters of characteristically Egyptian form. From Egypt it was carried before the 12th century to South Italy, and thence into France, where it became the property of the Abbey of St. Denys near Paris. René Marchal (hence name of the codex) obtained the manuscript from the Abbey of St. Denys. From the library of Marchal it passed into the hands of Cardinal La Rochefoucauld, who in turn presented it to the College de Clermont, the celebrated Jesuit house in Paris. Finally, in 1785, it was purchased for the Vatican Library, where it is now housed.

The codex was known by Bernard de Montfaucon and Giuseppe Bianchini. The text of the codex was used by J. Morius, Wettstein, an Montfaucon. It was collated for James Parsons, and edited by Tischendorf in the fourth volume of his Nova Collectio 4 (1869), pp. 225–296, and in the ninth volume of his Nova Collectio 9 (1870), pp. 227–248. Giuseppe Cozza-Luzi edited its text in 1890.

Ceriani classified the text in 1890 as a Hesychian recension, but Hexaplaric signs have been freely added, and the margins supply copious extracts from Aquila, Symmachus, Theodotion, and the Septuaginta of the Hexapla.

The codex is housed in the Vatican Library (Vat. gr. 2125).

== See also ==
- Early Christian art and architecture
