= Biblia Hebraica (Kittel) =

Editions of the Hebrew Bible edited by Rudolf Kittel

Biblia Hebraica series
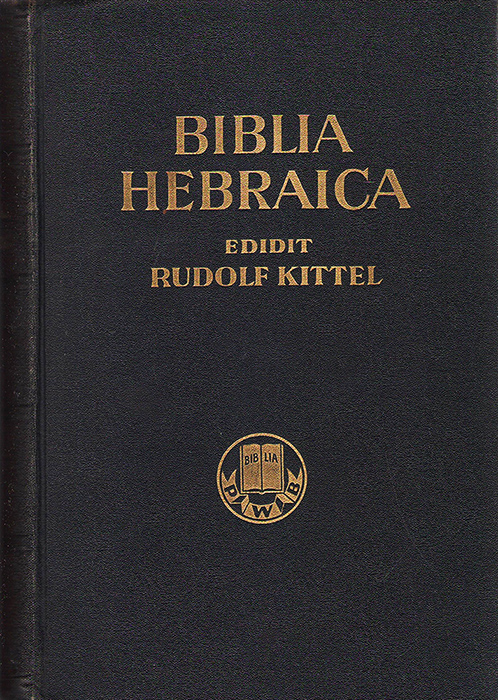
- BHK Biblia Hebraica Kittel (1. - 3.); BHS Biblia Hebraica Stuttgartensia (4.); BHQ Biblia Hebraica Quinta (5.)
- Edited by: Rudolf Kittel, Paul Kahle
- Language: Biblical Hebrew, Biblical Aramaic
- Published: BH^{1}: 1906, BH^{2}: 1913, BH^{3}: 1937
- Followed by: Biblia Hebraica Stuttgartensia
- Website: https://www.academic-bible.com/en/home/scholarly-editions/hebrew-bible/bhk/

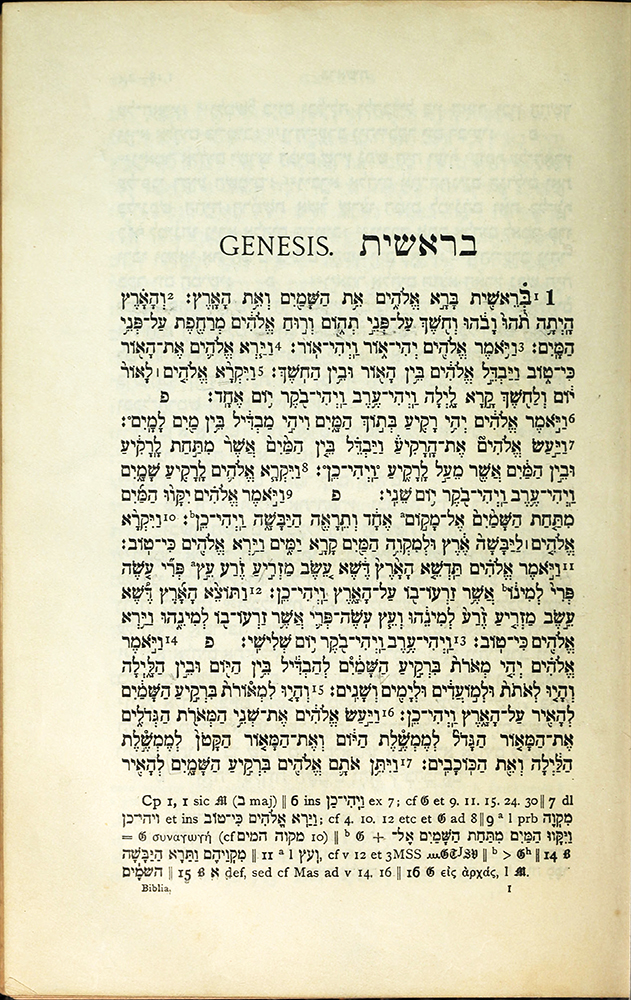
A sample page from the BH^{1} edition of Biblia Hebraica Kittel from 1909 (Genesis 1:1-17a).

Biblia Hebraica refers primarily to the three editions of the Hebrew Bible edited by Rudolf Kittel. When referenced, Kittel's Biblia Hebraica is usually abbreviated BH, or BHK (K for Kittel). When specific editions are referred to, BH^{1}, BH^{2} and BH^{3} are used. Biblia Hebraica is a Latin phrase meaning Hebrew Bible, traditionally used as a title for printed editions of the Tanakh. Less commonly, Biblia Hebraica may also refer to subsequent editions in the Biblia Hebraica series which build on the work of Kittel's editions.

== Editions by Kittel ==
The Old Testament scholar Rudolf Kittel from Leipzig started to develop a critical edition of the Hebrew Bible in 1901, which would later become the first of its kind. His first edition Biblia Hebraica edidit Rudolf Kittel (BH^{1}) was published as a two-volume work in 1906 under the publisher J. C. Hinrichs in Leipzig.

The second edition of Kittel's Biblia Hebraica (BH^{2}) appeared in 1913.

BH^{3} appeared in installments, from 1929 to 1937, with the first one-volume edition in 1937. Some of the references in the textual apparatus quote manuscripts that have been destroyed in the bombing of Leipzig during World War II and therefore no longer exist.

== Subsequent editions ==
The third edition was superseded by the Biblia Hebraica Stuttgartensia (BH^{4}), which appeared in installments from 1968 to 1976 and as a single volume in 1977. The current project in this tradition is the Biblia Hebraica Quinta (BH^{5}), which started in 2004 and will be completed after 2024.

== See also ==
- List of Hebrew Bible manuscripts
- Textual criticism of the Hebrew Bible
- Textual variants in the Hebrew Bible
