= Isaiah 58 =

Book of Isaiah, chapter 58

- ← chapter 57 chapter 59 →
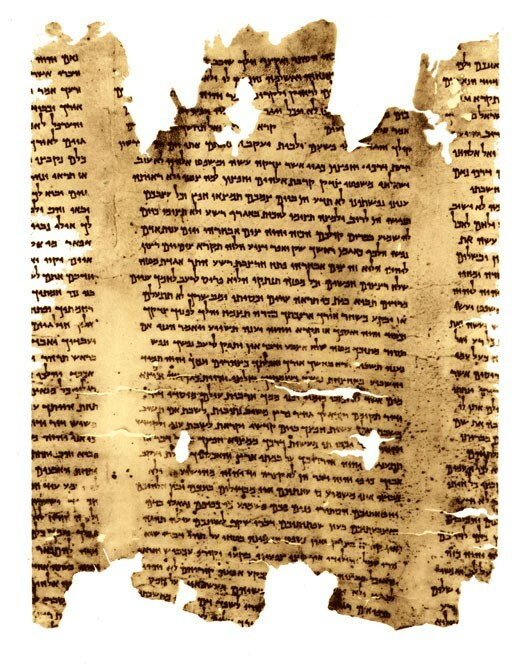
- Isaiah 57:17–59:9 in a part of Isaiah Scroll 1QIsa^{b} (made before 100 BCE) among the Dead Sea Scrolls at Qumran
- Book: Book of Isaiah
- Hebrew Bible part: Nevi'im
- Order in the Hebrew part: 5
- Category: Latter Prophets
- Christian Bible part: Old Testament
- Order in the Christian part: 23

Isaiah 58 is the fifty-eighth chapter of the Book of Isaiah in the Hebrew Bible or the Old Testament of the Christian Bible. This book contains the prophecies attributed to the prophet Isaiah, and is one of the Books of the Prophets. Chapters 56-66 are often referred to as Trito-Isaiah. This chapter contains a proclamation regarding "fasting that pleases God".

== Text ==
The original text was written in Hebrew language. This chapter is divided into 14 verses.

=== Textual witnesses ===
Some early manuscripts containing the text of this chapter in Hebrew are of the Masoretic Text tradition, which includes the Codex Cairensis (895), the Petersburg Codex of the Prophets (916), Aleppo Codex (10th century), Codex Leningradensis (1008).

Fragments containing parts of this chapter were found among the Dead Sea Scrolls (3rd century BCE or later):

- 1QIsa^{a}: with all verses (1–14)
- 1QIsa^{b} with all verses (1–14)
- 4QIsa^{d} (4Q58): extant verses 1–3, 5–7
- 4QIsa^{n} (4Q67): extant verses 13–14

There is also a translation into Koine Greek known as the Septuagint, made in the last few centuries BCE. Extant ancient manuscripts of the Septuagint version include Codex Vaticanus (B; $\mathfrak{G}$^{B}; 4th century), Codex Sinaiticus (S; BHK: $\mathfrak{G}$^{S}; 4th century), Codex Alexandrinus (A; $\mathfrak{G}$^{A}; 5th century) and Codex Marchalianus (Q; $\mathfrak{G}$^{Q}; 6th century).

== Parashot ==
The parashah sections listed here are based on the Aleppo Codex. Isaiah 58 is a part of the Consolations (Isaiah 40–66). {P}: open parashah.

{P} 58:1-14 {P}

== Verse 3 ==
Wherefore have we fasted, say they, and thou seest not?

wherefore have we afflicted our soul, and thou takest no knowledge?

Behold, in the day of your fast ye find pleasure,

and exact all your labours.

== Verse 12 ==
And they that shall be of thee shall build the old waste places:

thou shalt raise up the foundations of many generations;

and thou shalt be called, The repairer of the breach,

The restorer of paths to dwell in.

In some versions, "the old waste places" is translated as "ancient ruins": John Skinner, in the Cambridge Bible for Schools and Colleges, suggests that "the description of the ruins as 'ancient' suggests a period considerably later than the Exile (which only lasted half a century), although the argument is not one that can be rigorously pressed".

== See also ==
- Jacob
- Related Bible parts: Isaiah 61, Acts 15

== Bibliography ==
- Würthwein, Ernst (1995). The Text of the Old Testament. Translated by Rhodes, Erroll F. Grand Rapids, MI: Wm. B. Eerdmans. ISBN 0-8028-0788-7.
