= Isaiah 59 =

Book of Isaiah, chapter 59

- ← chapter 58 chapter 60 →
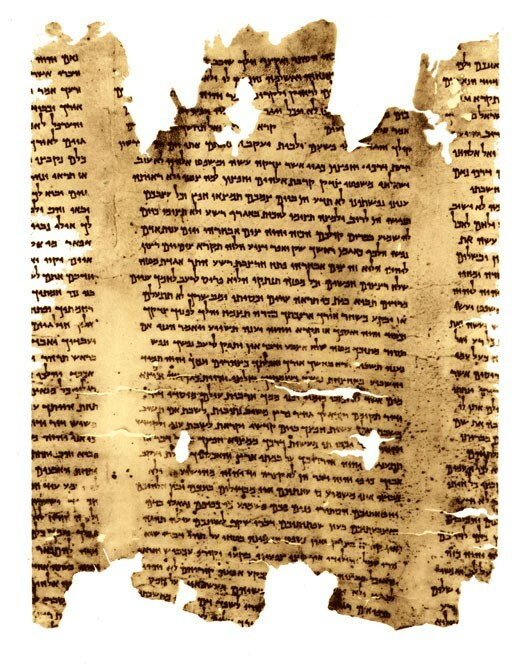
- Isaiah 57:17–59:9 in a part of Isaiah Scroll 1QIsa^{b} (made before 100 BCE) among the Dead Sea Scrolls at Qumran.
- Book: Book of Isaiah
- Hebrew Bible part: Nevi'im
- Order in the Hebrew part: 5
- Category: Latter Prophets
- Christian Bible part: Old Testament
- Order in the Christian part: 23

Isaiah 59 is the fifty-ninth chapter of the Book of Isaiah in the Hebrew Bible and the Old Testament of the Christian Bible. This book contains the prophecies attributed to the prophet Isaiah, and is one of the Books of the Prophets. Chapters 56–66 are often referred to as Trito-Isaiah.

== Text ==
The original text was written in Hebrew language. This chapter is divided into 21 verses.

=== Textual witnesses ===
Some early manuscripts containing the text of this chapter in Biblical Hebrew are of the Masoretic Text tradition, which includes the Codex Cairensis (895), the Petersburg Codex of the Prophets (916), Aleppo Codex (10th century), Codex Leningradensis (1008).

Fragments containing parts of this chapter were found among the Dead Sea Scrolls (3rd century BCE or later):

- 1QIsa^{a}: all verses
- 1QIsa^{b} : extant verses 1–8, 20–21
- 4QIsa^{h} (4Q62): extant verses 15–16

There is also a translation into Koine Greek known as the Septuagint, made in the last few centuries BCE. Extant ancient manuscripts of the Septuagint version include Codex Vaticanus (B; $\mathfrak{G}$^{B}; 4th century), Codex Sinaiticus (S; BHK: $\mathfrak{G}$^{S}; 4th century), Codex Alexandrinus (A; $\mathfrak{G}$^{A}; 5th century) and Codex Marchalianus (Q; $\mathfrak{G}$^{Q}; 6th century).

== Parashot ==
The parashah sections listed here are based on the Aleppo Codex. Isaiah 59 is a part of the Consolations (Isaiah 40–66). {P}: open parashah; {S}: closed parashah.

{P} 59:1-14 {S} 59:15-21 {S}

== Verse 1 ==
Behold, the Lord's hand is not shortened, that it cannot save;

neither his ear heavy, that it cannot hear:

== Verse 2 ==
But your iniquities have separated between you and your God,

and your sins have hid his face from you, that he will not hear.

== Verse 17 ==
For He put on righteousness as a breastplate,
And a helmet of salvation on His head;
He put on the garments of vengeance for clothing,
And was clad with zeal as a cloak.

- "Put on": from Hebrew root labash, "armed" or "clothed with armor"; this Hebrew term together with those of "helmet" (ko'ba), and "breastplate" (shiryon; "coat") are found in 1 Samuel 17:5.

The first two lines

"He put on (LXX: enedusato) righteousness as a breastplate (dikaiosunēn thōraka), and a helmet of salvation (perikephalaian sōtēriou) on His head"

are alluded to in the Christian New Testament's 1 Thessalonians 5:8:

"Putting on (Greek: endusamenoi) the breastplate of faith and love (thōraka pisteōs kai agapēs), and as a helmet the hope of salvation (perikephalaian elpida sōtērias)"

wherein Paul the Apostle changes "the breastplate of righteousness" to "the breastplate of faith and love", and adds "hope" to "the helmet of salvation".

The same lines are also alluded in Wisdom 5:18, which is presumably dependent on Isaiah:

"He will put on righteousness as a breastplate (endusetai thōraka dikaiosunēn), and he will don true judgement instead of a helmet."

== Verse 21 ==
As for me, this is my covenant with them, saith the Lord;

My spirit that is upon thee, and my words which I have put in thy mouth,
shall not depart out of thy mouth,
nor out of the mouth of thy seed,
nor out of the mouth of thy seed's seed,

saith the Lord, from henceforth and for ever.

== See also ==
- Armor of God
- Jacob
- Zion
- Related Bible parts: John 16, Acts 1, Acts 2

== Bibliography ==
- Esler, Philip F. (2007). "71. 1 Thessalonians". In Barton, John; Muddiman, John (eds.). The Oxford Bible Commentary (first (paperback) ed.). Oxford University Press. pp. 1199–1212. ISBN 978-0199277186.
- Würthwein, Ernst (1995). The Text of the Old Testament. Translated by Rhodes, Erroll F. Grand Rapids, MI: Wm. B. Eerdmans. ISBN 0-8028-0788-7.
