= Isaiah 61 =

Book of Isaiah, chapter 61

- ← chapter 60 chapter 62 →
- The Great Isaiah Scroll, the best preserved of the biblical scrolls found at Qumran from the second century BC, contains all the verses in this chapter.
- Book: Book of Isaiah
- Hebrew Bible part: Nevi'im
- Order in the Hebrew part: 5
- Category: Latter Prophets
- Christian Bible part: Old Testament
- Order in the Christian part: 23

Isaiah 61 is the sixty-first chapter of the Book of Isaiah in the Hebrew Bible or the Old Testament of the Christian Bible. This book contains the prophecies attributed to the prophet Isaiah, and is one of the Books of the Prophets. Chapters 56-66 are often referred to as Trito-Isaiah. In chapters 60–62, "three magnificent chapters", the prophet "hails the rising sun of Jerusalem’s prosperity". According to Luke 4:17, Jesus, visiting the synagogue at Nazareth, was handed "the book of the prophet Isaiah" and "found the place" where the opening verses of this chapter were written. The New King James Version sub-titles this chapter "The Good News of Salvation". The speaker and message of this chapter have been linked with the Servant of Isaiah 40–55: although the word "servant" does not appear here, his actions are presented as actions of servanthood.

== Text ==
The original text was written in Hebrew. This chapter is divided into 11 verses. Some early manuscripts containing the text of this chapter in Hebrew are of the Masoretic Text tradition, which includes the Codex Cairensis (895), the Petersburg Codex of the Prophets (916), Aleppo Codex (10th century), Codex Leningradensis (1008).

Fragments containing parts of this chapter were found among the Dead Sea Scrolls (3rd century BC or later):

- 1QIsa^{a}: complete
- 1QIsa^{b}: extant: verses 1‑2
- 4QIsa^{b} (4Q56): extant: verses 1‑3
- 4QIsa^{h} (4Q62): extant: verses 1–2
- 4QIsa^{m} (4Q66): extant: verses 3–6

There is also a translation into Koine Greek known as the Septuagint, made in the last few centuries BCE. Extant ancient manuscripts of the Septuagint version include Codex Vaticanus (B; $\mathfrak{G}$^{B}; 4th century), Codex Sinaiticus (S; BHK: $\mathfrak{G}$^{S}; 4th century), Codex Alexandrinus (A; $\mathfrak{G}$^{A}; 5th century) and Codex Marchalianus (Q; $\mathfrak{G}$^{Q}; 6th century).

== Parashot ==
The parashah sections listed here are based on the Aleppo Codex. Isaiah 61 is a part of the Consolations (Isaiah 40–66). {P}: open parashah; {S}: closed parashah.

{S} 61:1–9 {P} 61:10–11 [62:1–9 {S}]

== Contents and commentary ==
=== Verse 1 ===
The Spirit of the Lord God is upon me;

because the Lord hath anointed me to preach good tidings unto the meek;

he hath sent me to bind up the brokenhearted,

to proclaim liberty to the captives,

and the opening of the prison to them that are bound;

- Cited in Luke 4:18
- "The Spirit of the Lord God" has been promised in Isaiah 11:2 to come upon God's chosen one, through God's anointing (Hebrew: משח, mashah, the root word for "Messiah").
- "The captives": The role of the Spirit-filled figure is to bring justice to the victims of injustice, as in Isaiah 11:4.

=== Verse 2 ===
To proclaim the acceptable year of the Lord,

and the day of vengeance of our God;

to comfort all that mourn;

- Cited in Luke 4:19
- "The acceptable year of the Lord" (RSV, ESV: "the year of the Lord's favor") and the "release" (KJV: "the opening of the prison"; Hebrew: פְּקַח־קֽוֹחַ, pə-qaḥ-qō-w-aḥ) recall the "Jubilee year" in Leviticus 25:8–13.
- "The day of vengeance" was previously mentioned in Isaiah 34:8.

=== Verse 4 ===
And they shall build the old wastes, they shall raise up the former desolations, and they shall repair the waste cities, the desolations of many generations.

Cross reference: Isaiah 58:12

=== Verse 10 ===
I will greatly rejoice in the Lord,
My soul shall be joyful in my God;
For He has clothed me with the garments of salvation,
He has covered me with the robe of righteousness,
As a bridegroom decks himself with ornaments,
And as a bride adorns herself with her jewels.

The bridegroom wears "a priestly crown", as Bishop Robert Lowth translates it, observing that it is "an allusion to the magnificent dress of the high-priest when performing his functions, and particularly to the mitre, and crown, or plate of gold on the front of it".

== See also ==
- Jubilee (biblical) (Hebrew yovel יובל)
- Jubilee (Christianity)
- Related Bible parts: Leviticus 25, Psalm 146, Isaiah 58, Ezekiel 46, Luke 4, Revelation 5

== Sources ==
- Coggins, R (2007). "22. Isaiah". In Barton, John; Muddiman, John (eds.). The Oxford Bible Commentary (first (paperback) ed.). Oxford University Press. pp. 433–486. ISBN 978-0199277186.
- Würthwein, Ernst (1995). The Text of the Old Testament. Translated by Rhodes, Erroll F. Grand Rapids, MI: Wm. B. Eerdmans. ISBN 0-8028-0788-7.
