= Isaiah 65 =

Book of Isaiah, chapter 65

- ← chapter 64 chapter 66 →
- The Great Isaiah Scroll, the best preserved of the biblical scrolls found at Qumran from the second century BC, contains all the verses in this chapter.
- Book: Book of Isaiah
- Hebrew Bible part: Nevi'im
- Order in the Hebrew part: 5
- Category: Nevi'im-Latter Prophets
- Christian Bible part: Old Testament
- Order in the Christian part: 23

Isaiah 65 is the sixty-fifth chapter of the Book of Isaiah in the Hebrew Bible and the Old Testament of the Christian Bible. This book contains the prophecies attributed to the prophet Isaiah, and is one of the Books of the Prophets. Chapters 56-66 are often referred to as Trito-Isaiah. According the Christian exegesis, this chapter refers to the vocation of the gentiles.

== Text ==
The original text was written in Hebrew language. This chapter is divided into 25 verses.

=== Textual witnesses ===
Some early manuscripts containing the text of this chapter in Hebrew are of the Masoretic Text tradition, which includes the Codex Cairensis (895), the Petersburg Codex of the Prophets (916), Aleppo Codex (10th century), Codex Leningradensis (1008).

Fragments containing parts of this chapter were found among the Dead Sea Scrolls (3rd century BC or later):

- 1QIsa^{a}: complete
- 1QIsa^{b}: extant: verses 17‑25
- 4QIsa^{b} (4Q56): extant: verses 1

There is also a translation into Koine Greek known as the Septuagint, made in the last few centuries BCE. Extant ancient manuscripts of the Septuagint version include Codex Vaticanus (B; $\mathfrak{G}$^{B}; 4th century), Codex Sinaiticus (S; BHK: $\mathfrak{G}$^{S}; 4th century), Codex Alexandrinus (A; $\mathfrak{G}$^{A}; 5th century) and Codex Marchalianus (Q; $\mathfrak{G}$^{Q}; 6th century).

== Parashot ==
The parashah sections listed here are based on the Aleppo Codex. Isaiah 65 is a part of the Consolations (Isaiah 40–66). {P}: open parashah; {S}: closed parashah.

{P} 65:1-7 {S} 65:8-12 {P} 65:13-25 {S}

== Verse 1 ==
I am sought of them that asked not for me;

I am found of them that sought me not:

I said, Behold me, behold me,

unto a nation that was not called by my name.

- "I am sought": rather, "inquired of", or "consulted" (compare Ezekiel 14:3; Ezekiel 20:3, 31). The Pulpit Commentary suggests that the application of the text by Saint Paul (Romans 10:20) to the calling of the Gentiles will be felt by all believers in inspiration to preclude the interpretation which supposes Israel to be the subject of verse 1 no less than of verses 2–7.
- "I am found of them": Paul has rendered this Romans 10:20, Ἐμφανὴς ἐγενόμην Emphanēs egenomēn - 'I was made manifest.' The idea is, that they obtained his favor.f
- "nation … not called by my name": that is, the Gentiles. God retorts in their own words (Isaiah 63:19) that their plea as being exclusively "called by His name" will not avail, for God's gospel invitation is not so exclusive (Romans 9:25; 1:16).The calling of the Gentiles, Isaiah 65:1. The Jews, for their incredulity, idolatry, and hypocrisy, rejected, Isaiah 65:2-7. A remnant shall be saved, Isaiah 65:8-10. Judgments on the wicked, and blessings on the godly, Isaiah 65:11-16. The flourishing and peaceable state of the new Jerusalem, Isaiah 65:17-25. R. Moses the priest, as Aben Ezra observes, interprets this of the nations of the world; and that the sense is, "even to the Gentiles that are not called by my name I am preached", which agrees with Paul's sense of them (Romans 10:20).

== Verse 11 ==
But you who abandon the LORD, who forget My holy mountain, who prepare a table for Fortune and fill bowls of mixed wine for Destiny,

- "Fortune" is translated from Hebrew: Gad, while "Destiny" is translated from Hebrew Meni; both are the deities of fate and good luck venerated by ancient Syrians, Arabs and Nabateans.

== Verse 17 ==
For, behold, I create new heavens and a new earth:

and the former shall not be remembered, nor come into mind.

- "Create new heavens and a new earth": Israel's God is a creator deity.

== Verse 25 ==
The wolf and the lamb shall feed together,

and the lion shall eat straw like the bullock:

and dust shall be the serpent's meat.

They shall not hurt nor destroy in all my holy mountain,

saith the Lord.

This verse alludes to Isaiah 11:6–9

== See also ==
- Judah
- Sharon
- The Wolf and the Lamb
- Valley of Achor
- Related Bible parts: Isaiah 63, Ezekiel 14, Romans 9, Romans 10

== Sources ==
- Coggins, R (2007). "22. Isaiah". In Barton, John; Muddiman, John (eds.). The Oxford Bible Commentary (first (paperback) ed.). Oxford University Press. pp. 433–486. ISBN 978-0199277186.
- Coogan, Michael David (2007). Coogan, Michael David; Brettler, Marc Zvi; Newsom, Carol Ann; Perkins, Pheme (eds.). The New Oxford Annotated Bible with the Apocryphal/Deuterocanonical Books: New Revised Standard Version, Issue 48 (Augmented 3rd ed.). Oxford University Press. ISBN 9780195288810.
- Würthwein, Ernst (1995). The Text of the Old Testament. Translated by Rhodes, Erroll F. Grand Rapids, MI: Wm. B. Eerdmans. ISBN 0-8028-0788-7.
