= Isaiah 64 =

Book of Isaiah, chapter 64

- ← chapter 63 chapter 65 →
- The Great Isaiah Scroll, the best preserved of the biblical scrolls found at Qumran from the second century BC, contains all the verses in this chapter.
- Book: Book of Isaiah
- Hebrew Bible part: Nevi'im
- Order in the Hebrew part: 5
- Category: Latter Prophets
- Christian Bible part: Old Testament
- Order in the Christian part: 23

Isaiah 64 is the sixty-fourth chapter of the Book of Isaiah in the Hebrew Bible or the Old Testament of the Christian Bible. This book contains the prophecies attributed to the prophet Isaiah, and is one of the Books of the Prophets. Chapters 56-66 are often referred to as Trito-Isaiah. This chapter contains "a prayer for help" in a format which T. K. Cheyne describes as "a liturgical psalm".

== Text ==
The original text was written in the Hebrew language. This chapter is divided into 12 verses. In Hebrew texts, Isaiah 64:1 is numbered as 63:19b, and verses 2-12 are numbered as verses 1–11.

=== Textual witnesses ===
Some early manuscripts containing the text of this chapter in Hebrew are of the Masoretic Text tradition, which includes the Codex Cairensis (895), the Petersburg Codex of the Prophets (916), Aleppo Codex (10th century), Codex Leningradensis (1008).

Fragments containing parts of this chapter were found among the Dead Sea Scrolls (3rd century BC or later):

- 1QIsa^{a}: complete
- 1QIsa^{b}: extant: verses 1, 6‑8
- 4QIsa^{b} (4Q56): extant: verses 5‑11

There is also a translation into Koine Greek known as the Septuagint, made in the last few centuries BCE. Extant ancient manuscripts of the Septuagint version include Codex Vaticanus (B; $\mathfrak{G}$^{B}; 4th century), Codex Sinaiticus (S; BHK: $\mathfrak{G}$^{S}; 4th century), Codex Alexandrinus (A; $\mathfrak{G}$^{A}; 5th century) and Codex Marchalianus (Q; $\mathfrak{G}$^{Q}; 6th century).

== Parashot ==
The parashah sections listed here are based on the Aleppo Codex. Isaiah 64 is a part of the Consolations (Isaiah 40–66). {P}: open parashah; {S}: closed parashah.

[{S} 63:7-19] 64:1-2 {S} 64:3-11 {P}

== Verse 8 ==
But now, O Lord, thou art our father;

we are the clay, and thou our potter;

and we all are the work of thy hand.

A similar message is found in Jeremiah 18:6:

“O house of Israel, can I not do with you as this potter?” says the Lord. “Look, as the clay is in the potter’s hand, so are you in My hand, O house of Israel!”

== See also ==
- Potter
- Related Bible parts: Isaiah 29, Isaiah 45, Isaiah 63, Jeremiah 18, Romans 9, Romans 11

== Bibliography ==
- Würthwein, Ernst (1995). The Text of the Old Testament. Translated by Rhodes, Erroll F. Grand Rapids, MI: Wm. B. Eerdmans. ISBN 0-8028-0788-7.
