= Acts 13 =

- ← chapter 12 chapter 14 →
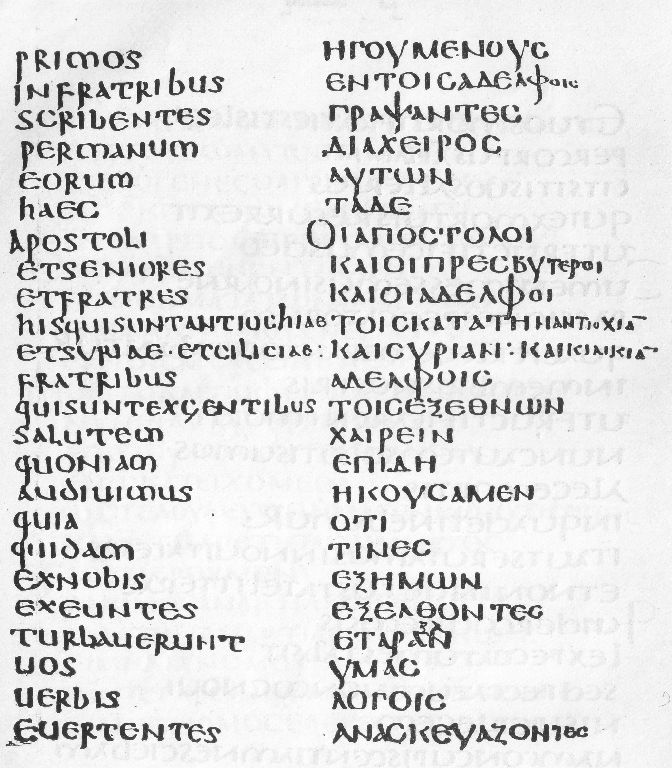
- Acts 15:22–24 in Latin (left column) and Greek (right column) in Codex Laudianus, written about AD 550.
- Book: Acts of the Apostles
- Category: Church history
- Christian Bible part: New Testament
- Order in the Christian part: 5

Acts 13 is the thirteenth chapter of the Acts of the Apostles in the New Testament of the Christian Bible. It records the first missionary journey of Paul and Barnabas to Cyprus and Pisidia. Early Christian tradition uniformly affirmed that Luke composed this book as well as the Gospel of Luke. Critical opinion on the tradition was evenly divided at the end of the 20th century. From this point onwards, except for the Council held in Jerusalem (Acts 15), Luke's narrative focusses on Paul, his ministry, and the events of his life.

== Text ==
The original text was written in Koine Greek. This chapter is divided into 52 verses.

=== Textual witnesses ===
Some early manuscripts containing the text of this chapter are:

- Codex Vaticanus (AD 325–350)
- Codex Sinaiticus (330–360)
- Codex Bezae (~400)
- Codex Alexandrinus (400–440)
- Codex Ephraemi Rescriptus (~450; extant verses 2–52)
- Codex Laudianus (~550)

=== Old Testament Citations Appearing in the Relevant New Testament Passages ===
The apostle Paul's "potted resume of Israel's history" in this chapter includes a number of Old Testament references:

- Acts 13:17: Exodus 1:1 and Exodus 13:14
- Acts 13:18: Exodus 13:16
- Acts 13:20: John 14:1 and Judges 3:9
- Acts 13:21: 1 Samuel 8:5
- Acts 13:22: Psalm 89:20; 1 Samuel 13:14
- Acts 13:23: Isaiah 11:1
- Acts 13:33: Psalm 2:7
- Acts 13:34: Isaiah 55:3
- Acts 13:35: Psalm 16:10
- Acts 13:36: Psalm 16:11
- Acts 13:38: 1 Kings 2:10
- Acts 13:40–41: Habakkuk 1:5
- Acts 13:47: Isaiah 49:6

=== New Testament references ===
- Acts 13:24: Matthew 3:1
- Acts 13:25: John 1:20
- Acts 13:28: Matthew 27:22
- Acts 13:30: Matthew 28:6
- Acts 13:33: Hebrews 1:5; 5:5
- Acts 13:51: Matthew 10:14

== Locations ==
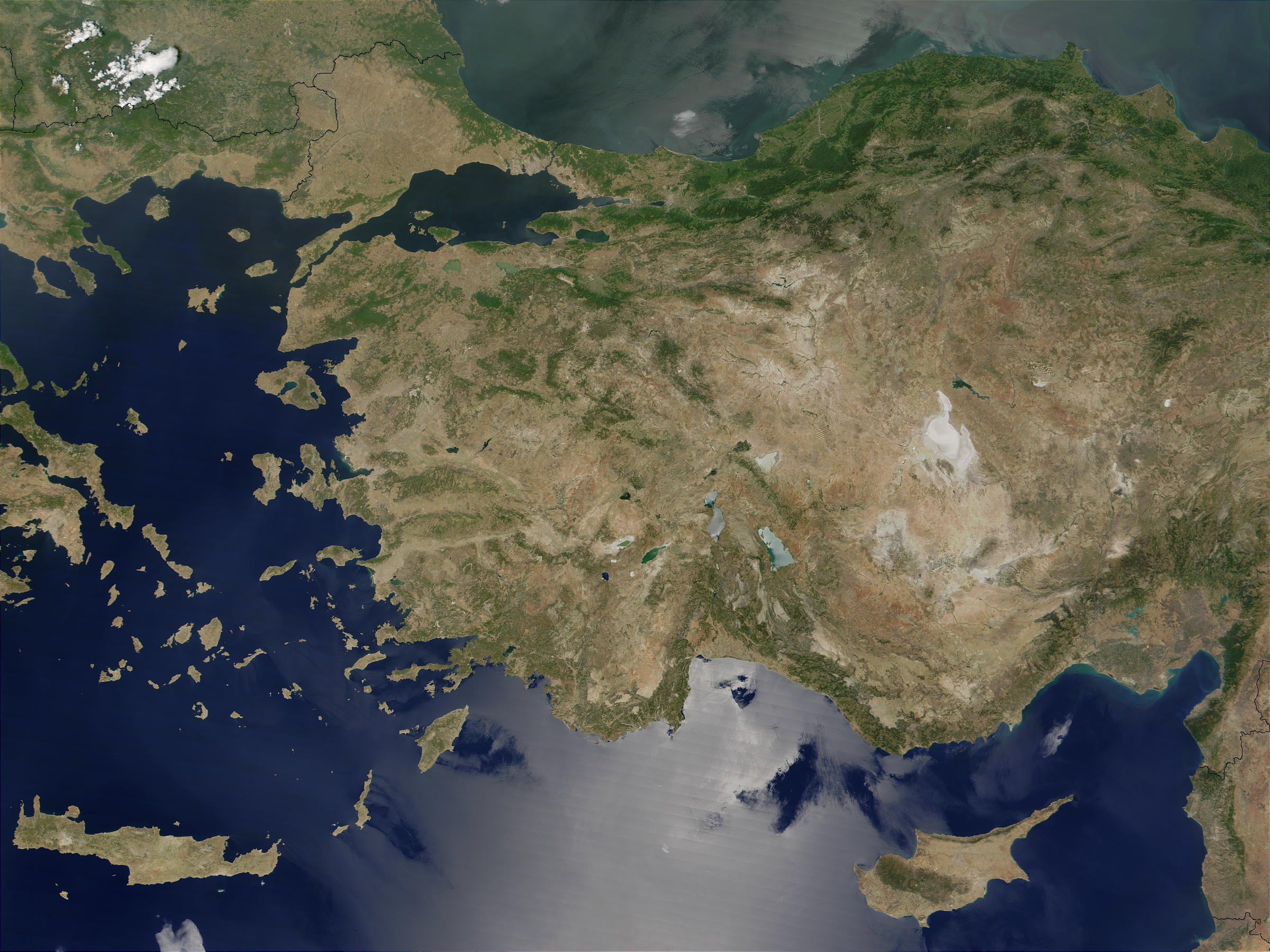
Places visited by Saul (Paul) and Barnabas (blue) and other places (red).

This chapter mentions the following places (in order of appearance):

- Antioch, Syria
- Seleucia (Greek: σελευκεια), i.e. Seleucia Pieria, the port serving Antioch
- Cyprus: Salamis, Paphos
- Perga, Pamphylia
- Jerusalem
- Antioch, Pisidia
- Iconium, Phrygia

== Timeline ==
The first missionary journey of Paul and Barnabas took place about AD 47–48.

== The church in Antioch (13:1–3) ==
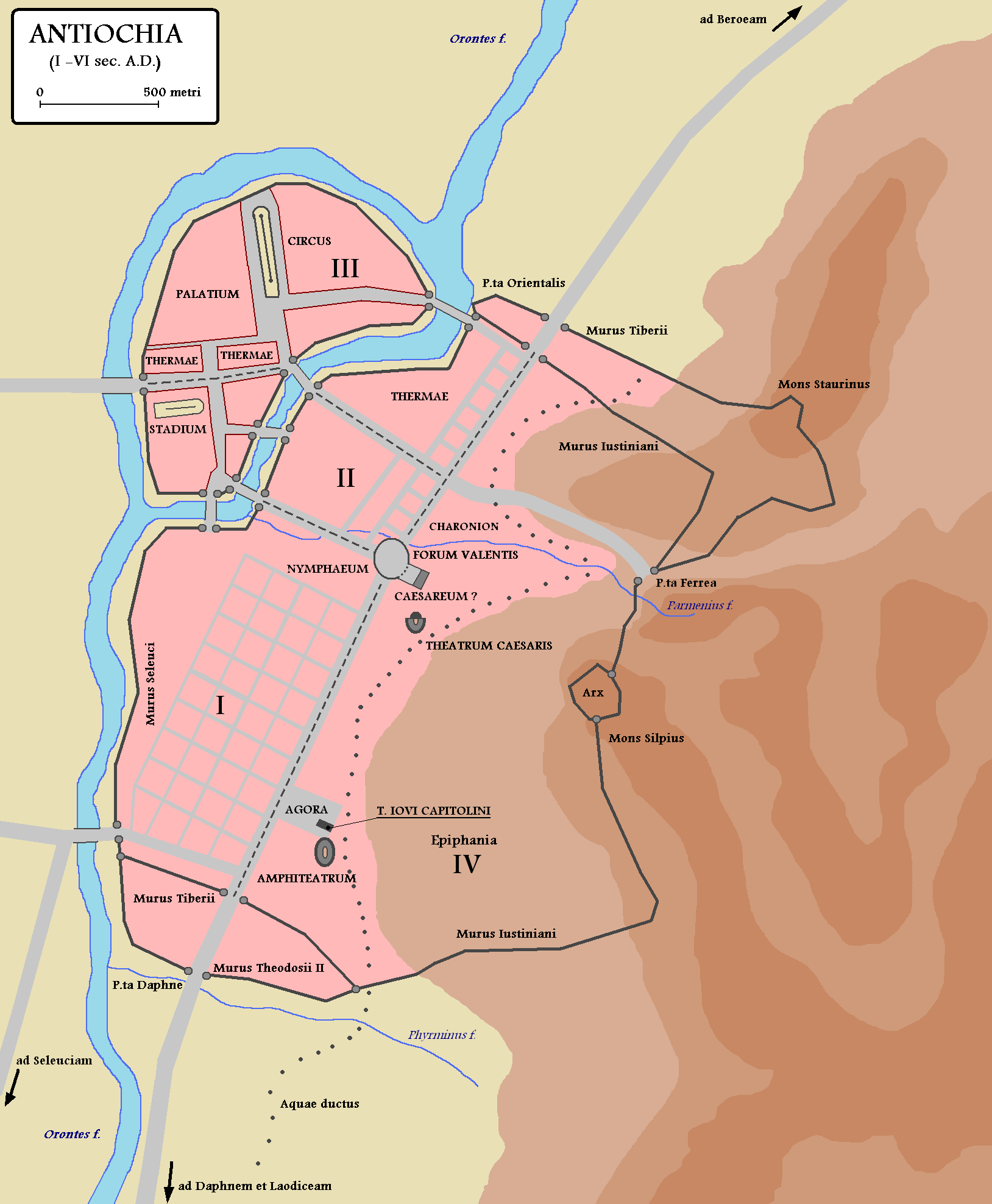
Map of Antiochia (Antioch) in Roman and early Byzantine times

This section opens the account of Paul's first missionary journey (Acts 13:1-14:28) which starts with a deliberate and prayerful step of the church in Antioch, a young congregation established by those who had been scattered from persecution in Jerusalem (Acts 11:20–26) and has grown into an active missionary church. Paul's mission was not his own initiative, but was undertaken at the command of the Holy Spirit (verses 2, 4), with the framework of prayer and fasting forming an inclusio at the end of this first journey (Acts 14:26).

=== Verse 1 ===
Now in the church that was at Antioch there were certain prophets and teachers:

Barnabas,
Simeon who was called Niger,
Lucius of Cyrene,
Manaen who had been brought up with Herod the tetrarch, and
Saul.

This Lucius of Cyrene is thought to be the same person as mentioned in Romans 16:21, or the same as Luke, the writer of the Gospel of Luke and the Acts of the Apostles. Heinrich Meyer observes that:

The order of the persons named is, without doubt, such as it stood in the original document: hence Barnabas and Saul are separated; indeed, Barnabas is placed first (the arrangement appears to have been made according to seniority) and Saul last; it was only by his missionary labours now commencing that the latter acquired in point of fact his superiority.

=== Verse 2 ===
As they ministered to the Lord and fasted, the Holy Spirit said, "Now separate to Me Barnabas and Saul for the work to which I have called them."

=== Verse 3 ===
Accordingly, after fasting and prayer, they placed their hands on them and dismissed them.

This ritual of laying on hands relates to the two apostles being commissioned for a specific task: it is not an ordination.

== Journey from Antioch to Cyprus (13:4–5) ==
The first main destination of the missionary journey is the island of Cyprus, Barnabas' home area (Acts 4:36). There were already believers who scattered due to the persecution in Jerusalem (Acts 11:19), but Barnabas and Saul came on a mission ('sent out by the Holy Spirit', verse 4) to visit formal meeting-places of Jewish communities they pass through (verse 5) to preach the gospel.

=== Verse 4 ===
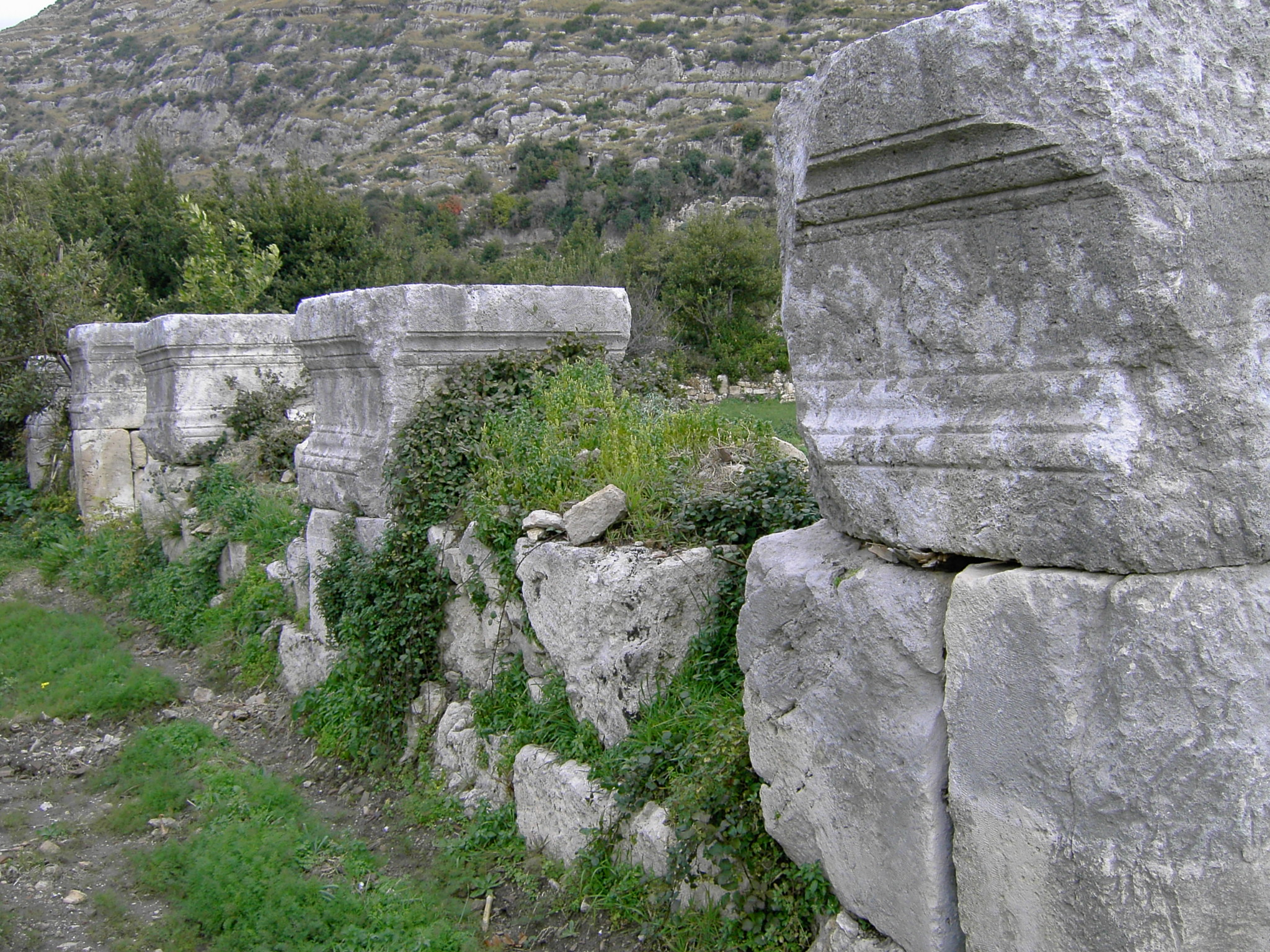
Remaining column plinths of possibly the main/harbour street at Seleucia, where Barnabas and Paul started their journey to Cyprus.

So, being sent out by the Holy Spirit, they went down to Seleucia, and from there they sailed to Cyprus.

- "They": Barnabas and Saul (Acts 13:2)

== The governor and the guru (13:6–12) ==
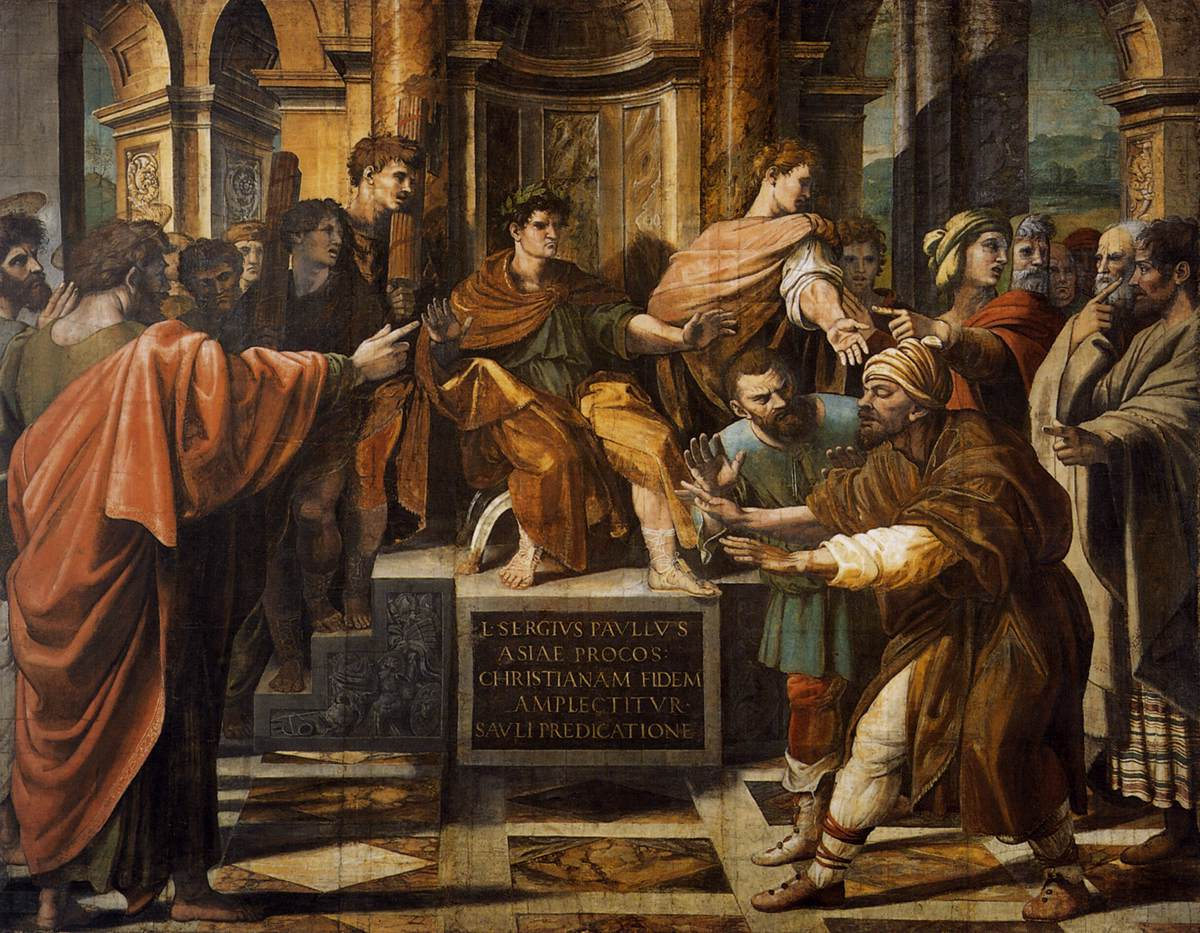
Elymas the sorcerer is struck blind before Sergius Paulus. Painting by Raphael from the Raphael Cartoons.

The account of Saul/Paul displaying the supernatural power of the Holy Spirit (verse 9) that led a proconsul into faith (verse 12) parallels Simon Peter's encounters with Simon Magus (Acts 8:14–24), and with Ananias and Sapphira (Acts 5:1–11). Paul sharply denounced Elymas using a prophetic language (verses 10–11) that resulted in the latter's blindness using words echoing Paul's own experience in Acts 9:8–9.

=== Verse 6 ===
Now when they had gone through the island to Paphos, they found a certain sorcerer, a false prophet, a Jew whose name was Bar-Jesus,

It is noted from his failure to recognize the truth of gospel (verse 8) that Elymas is a 'false prophet', using the term magus (verses 6, 8), which is always in negative sense in the book of Acts (Acts 8:5—13).

=== Verse 7 ===
who was with the proconsul, Sergius Paulus, an intelligent man. This man called for Barnabas and Saul and sought to hear the word of God.

The correct Greek title (anthupatos, proconsul) is used for a governor of a senatorial province. A 'Sergius Paulus' is mentioned in a Roman inscription as a holder of an office in Rome under Claudius (at about the same period) and his family also seems to have a tie to Pisidia.

=== Verse 9 ===
However, Saul (who is the same as Paul), full of the Holy Spirit, fixed his eyes on him

The change of name from Saul (a Hebrew name) to Paul (Latin name; verse 9) is appropriate as he moved deeper into "Gentile territory", and very common for diaspora Jews to have Greek or Latin names alongside their Hebrew names.

=== Verse 12 ===
Then the proconsul believed, when he saw what had been done, being astonished at the teaching of the Lord.

Luke presents Sergius Paulus as the first Gentile ruler to believe the gospel. Unlike Cornelius (Acts 10:2), there is no evidence that Sergius attended the temple or was a God-fearer. This pagan government official was amazed at the power of God and believed the truth.

== Journey from Cyprus to Pisidia (13:13-52) ==
It is customary for Paul to start his mission by visiting the local synagogue (verse 14). Paul's sermon in a synagogue of Antioch in Pisidia (13:16—41) serves as the centerpiece of a long and tightly constructed travel-and-mission account, moving into new places (13:13-14, 51; 14:6-7), then successively going back retracing each stage of the journey (14:21, 24–26). All the sites visited by Paul on this journey eventually fall within the territory of the Roman province of Galatia in the first century, so it could be assumed that 'these are the churches Paul addresses in the Epistle to the Galatians'.

=== Verse 13 ===
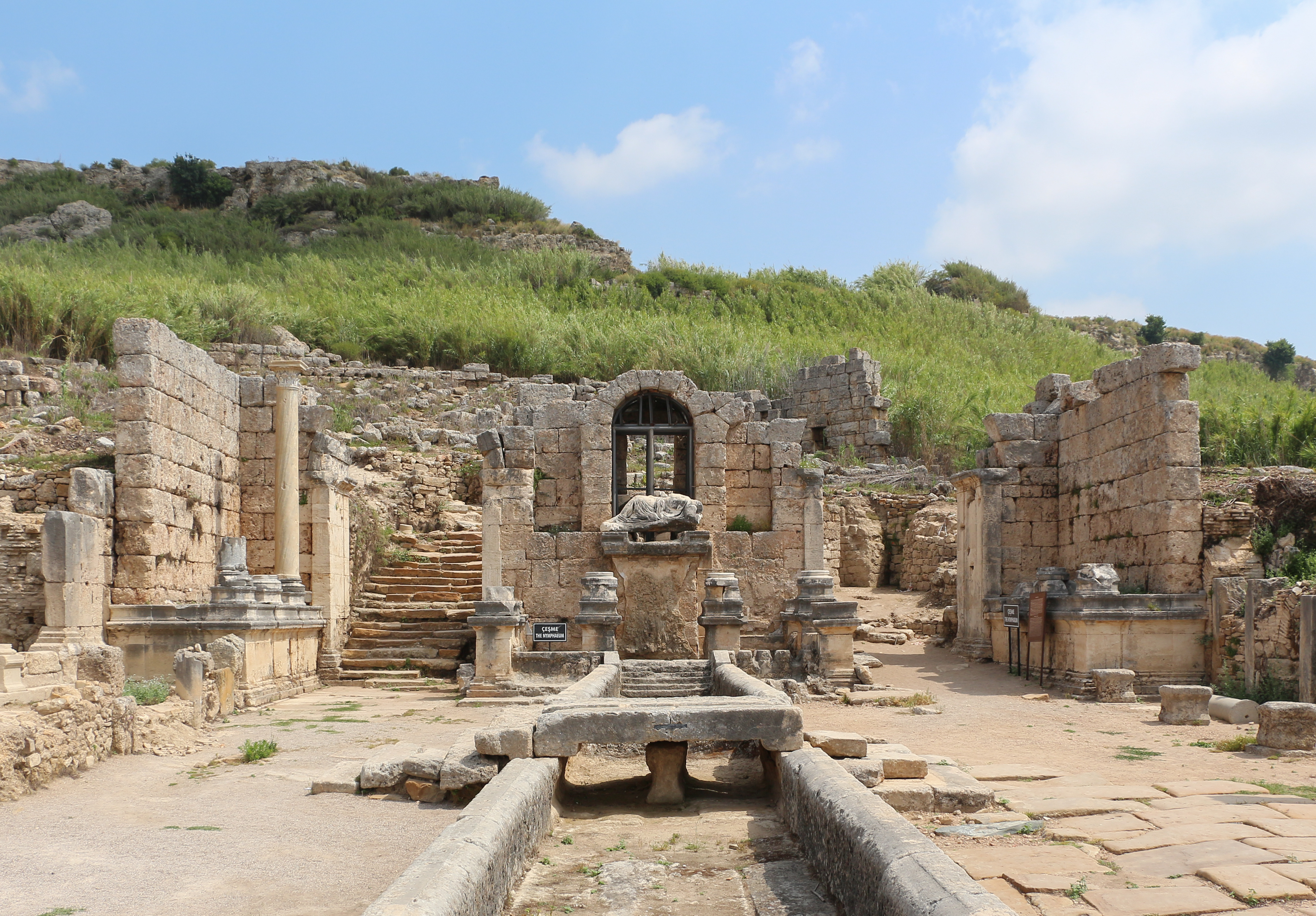
Ruins of the main street in Perga, capital of Pamphylia, where Paul and his party arrived after sailing from Paphos, Cyprus.

Now when Paul and his party set sail from Paphos, they came to Perga in Pamphylia; and John, departing from them, returned to Jerusalem.

This John, also mentioned in verse 5, was John Mark, the nephew of Barnabas (Acts 12:25). Whatever the trouble was between Paul and John Mark, it was enough for Paul not to want John Mark to accompany him on a later journey, which caused a rift between Paul and Barnabas (Acts 15:36–39). John Mark would prove faithful later in Paul's ministry (see 2 Timothy 4:11).

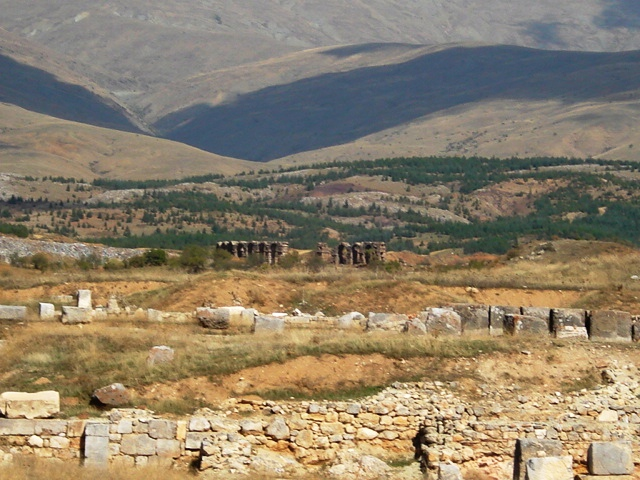
Ruins at Antioch of Pisidia

=== Verse 33 ===
God has fulfilled this for us their children, in that He has raised up Jesus. As it is also written in the second Psalm:

‘You are My Son,
Today I have begotten You.’

Citing Psalm 2:7, which is also quoted and used for exposition in Hebrews 1:5; 5:5.

=== Verse 34 ===
And as concerning that he raised him up from the dead,

now no more to return to corruption,

he said on this wise,
I will give you the sure mercies of David.

Citing Isaiah 55:3

== See also ==
- Antioch, Pisidia
- Antioch, Syria
- Barnabas
- David
- Elymas Bar-Jesus
- Iconium, Frygia
- Jerusalem
- John the Baptist
- John Mark
- Paphos, Cyprus
- Paul the Apostle
- Perga, Pamphylia
- Salamis, Cyprus
- Samuel
- Seleucia, Syria
- Sergius Paulus
- Via Sebaste
- Related Bible parts: Psalm 2, Isaiah 55, Habakkuk 1, Matthew 1, Matthew 3, Mark 1, Luke 3, John 1, Acts 1, Acts 9, Acts 11, Acts 12, Acts 14, Acts 15, Acts 22, Acts 26, Hebrews 1, Hebrews 5

== Sources ==
- Alexander, Loveday (2007). "62. Acts". In Barton, John; Muddiman, John (eds.). The Oxford Bible Commentary (first (paperback) ed.). Oxford University Press. pp. 1028–1061. ISBN 978-0199277186.
- Coogan, Michael David (2007). Coogan, Michael David; Brettler, Marc Zvi; Newsom, Carol Ann; Perkins, Pheme (eds.). The New Oxford Annotated Bible with the Apocryphal/Deuterocanonical Books: New Revised Standard Version, Issue 48 (Augmented 3rd ed.). Oxford University Press. ISBN 9780195288810.
- Kirkpatrick, A. F. (1901). The Book of Psalms: with Introduction and Notes. The Cambridge Bible for Schools and Colleges. Vol. Book IV and V: Psalms XC-CL. Cambridge: At the University Press.
