= 1QIsa (disambiguation) =

1QIsa may refer to:

- the Isaiah Scroll (1QIsa^{a}), a scroll containing the entire Book of Isaiah found at Qumran Cave 1
- 1QIsa^{b}, a fragmentary copy of the Book of Isaiah found at Qumran Cave 1
