= Acts 14 =

- ← chapter 13 chapter 15 →
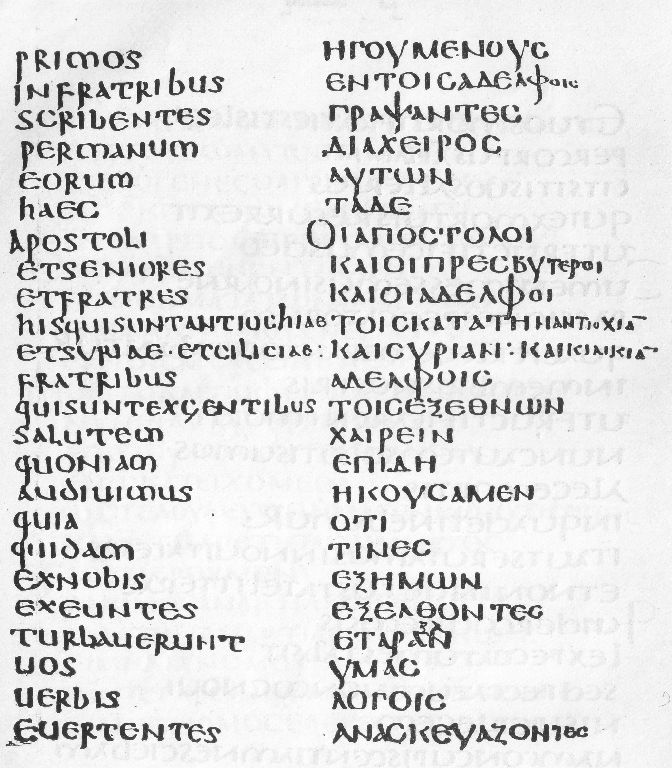
- Acts 15:22–24 in Latin (left column) and Greek (right column) in Codex Laudianus, written about AD 550.
- Book: Acts of the Apostles
- Category: Church history
- Christian Bible part: New Testament
- Order in the Christian part: 5

Acts 14 is the fourteenth chapter of the Acts of the Apostles in the New Testament of the Christian Bible. It records the first missionary journey of Paul and Barnabas to Phrygia and Lycaonia. Early Christian tradition uniformly affirmed that Luke composed this book as well as the Gospel of Luke. Critical opinion on the tradition was evenly divided at the end of the 20th century.

== Text ==
The original text was written in Koine Greek. This chapter is divided into 28 verses.

=== Textual witnesses ===
Some early manuscripts containing the text of this chapter are:

In Greek

- Codex Vaticanus (AD 325–350)
- Codex Sinaiticus (330–360)
- Codex Bezae (~400)
- Codex Alexandrinus (400–440)
- Codex Ephraemi Rescriptus (~450)
- Codex Laudianus (~550; complete)

In Latin

- Codex Laudianus (~550; complete)
- León palimpsest (7th century; extant verses 21–28).

=== Old Testament references ===
- Acts 14:15: Genesis 1:1 and Psalm 146:6
- Acts 14:16: Psalm 81:13

=== New Testament references ===
- Acts 14:15: Revelation 14:7
- Acts 14:19: 2 Corinthians 11:25

== Locations ==
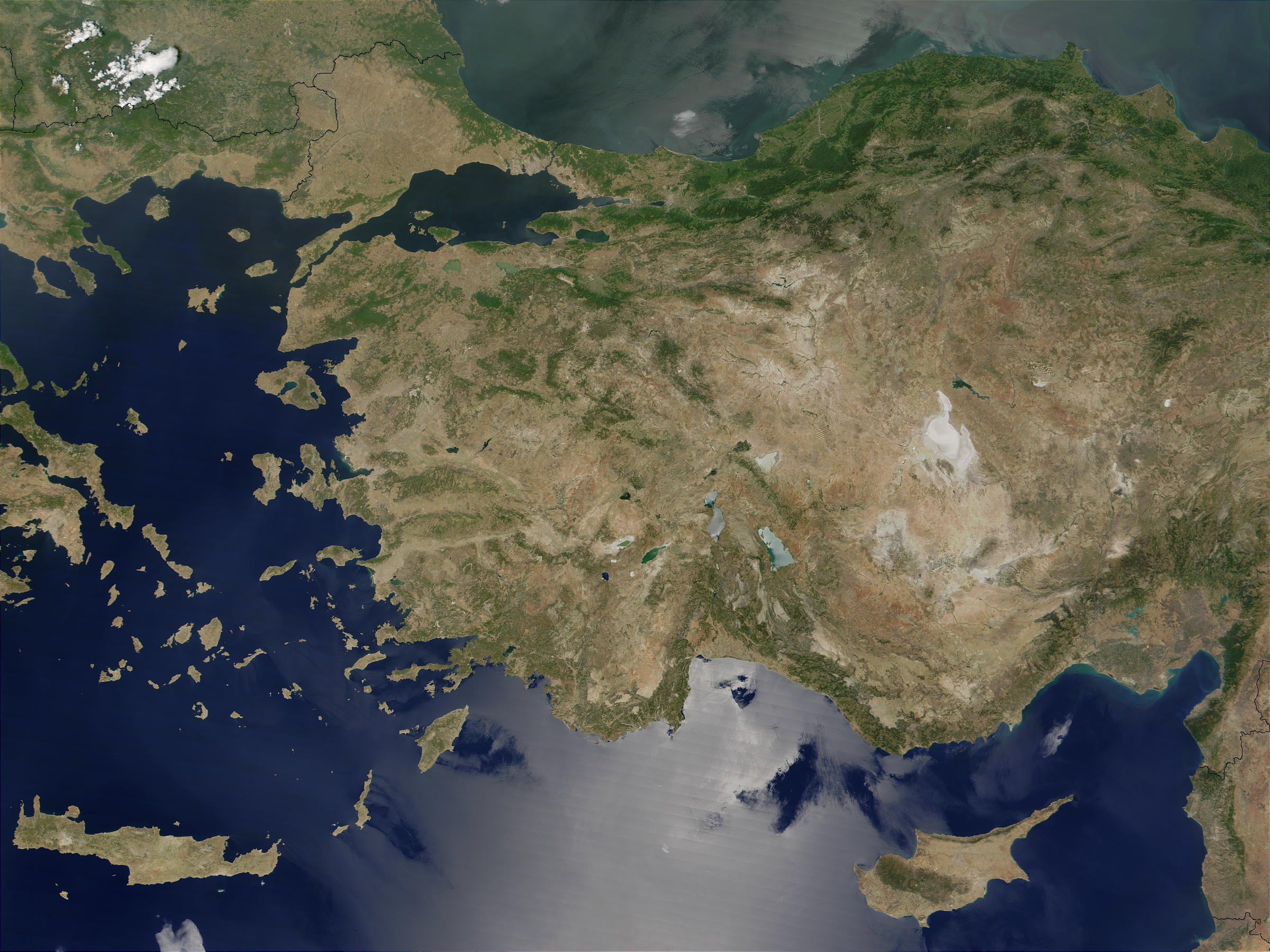
Places mentioned in (blue dots) and related to (red dots) this chapter.

This chapter mentions the following places (in order of appearance):

- Iconium, Phrygia
- Lystra and Derbe, cities of Lycaonia
- Antioch, Pisidia
- Perga, Pamphylia
- Attalia
- Antioch, Syria

== Timeline ==
The first missionary journey of Paul and Barnabas took place about AD 47–48.

== Preaching in Iconium (verses 1-7) and Lystra (verses 8–20) ==
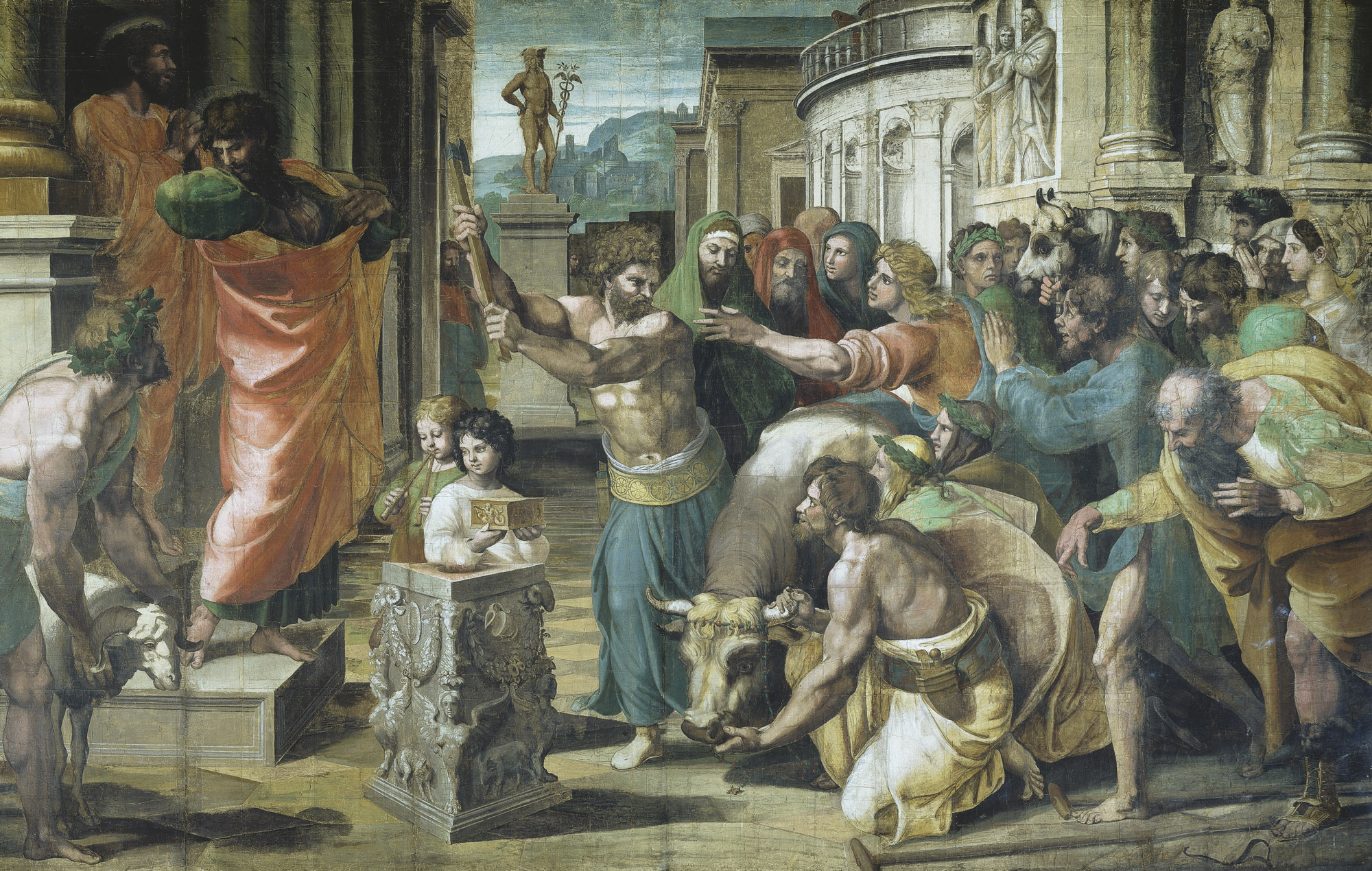
The Sacrifice at Lystra by Raphael, 1515.

Paul and his companions went out of Antioch in Pisidia to the east, apparently following the Roman road (Via Sebaste) which connects the Roman colonies of Antioch, Iconium (modern: Konya; 150 kilometres (93 mi) to the southeast) and Lystra (30 km further to the southwest). Although the initial responses of both Jews and Greeks in the Iconium synagogue is positive (verse 1), the account focuses less on the church's foundation story, and more on the repeated opposition from "unbelieving Jews" or (in the aorist tense) "Jews who had decided against belief" in these cities.

=== Verse 8 ===
At Lystra there was a crippled man, lame from birth, who had never walked.

This man's needs and circumstances match those of the man healed by Peter and John in Acts 3:2. Theologians Matthias Schneckenburger, Ferdinand Christian Baur, and Eduard Zeller considered that this narrative originated "from an imitation of the narrative of the earlier Petrine miracle in chapter 3".

=== Verse 11 ===
Now when the people saw what Paul had done, they raised their voices, saying in the Lycaonian language, "The gods have come down to us in the likeness of men!"

The Roman poet Ovid told of an ancient legend in which Zeus and Hermes came to the Phrygian hill country disguised as mortals seeking lodging. After being turned away from a thousand homes, they found refuge in the humble cottage of an elderly couple. In appreciation for the couple's hospitality, the gods transformed the cottage into a temple with a golden roof and marble columns. All the houses of the inhospitable people were then destroyed. This ancient legend may be the reason that the people treated Paul and Barnabas as gods. After witnessing the healing of the cripple, they did not want to make the same mistake as their ancestors. Ancient inscriptions confirm the existence of the local pre-Greek language ("Lycaonian") in that period, as well as the joint worship of Zeus and Hermes in the area.

=== Verses 19-20 ===
^{19} But Jews came from Antioch and Iconium, and having persuaded the crowds, they stoned Paul and dragged him out of the city, supposing that he was dead. ^{20} But when the disciples gathered about him, he rose up and entered the city, and on the next day he went on with Barnabas to Derbe.

With verse 19 there is an "abrupt return" to summary mode and to the theme of Christian persecution. Although the stoning of Paul was undertaken by "Jews from Antioch and Iconium", Henry Alford suggests that "they stoned him, not in the Jewish method, but tumultuously and in the streets, dragging him out of the city afterwards". Paul refers to the event in 2 Corinthians 11:25. But when the disciples gathered about Paul, he "rose up" (Greek: αναστας, anastas, as in the Resurrection of Jesus). The meaning here does not imply a "miraculous" recovery; rather, it shows "the protection and support" around him, which "gives Paul the strength to rise up and continue his apostolic mission".

Paul and Barnabas departed the next day for Derbe (Greek: εξηλθεν ... εις δερβην; 100 kilometres (62 mi) to the southeast of Lystra). Many translations render this text as 'and on the next day he went on with Barnabas to Derbe', implying they traveled within one day, but as it is about 60 miles from Lystra to the likely site of Derbe, Bastian van Elderen has stated that Acts 14:20 must be translated as 'on the next day he set out with Barnabas towards (or for) Derbe'.

== Returning to Pisidia (verses 21–23) ==
From Derbe, Paul and Barnabas began the journey back to Antioch, Pisidia, while consolidating the newly planted churches along the way: 'strengthening the soul and encouraging believers to remain in the faith (verse 22) in person as Paul later does with his letters (cf. 1 Thessalonians 2:14–16; 3:2–4). The term "Elders" (Greek: πρεσβυτέρους, presbyterous) is used by Paul as church officials in the Pastoral epistles (Titus 1:5; 1 Timothy 5:17,19), along with another term episkopoi (Acts 20:28; cf. Philippians 1:1).

== The journey home from Pisidia to Syria (verses 24–28) ==
This section records the conclusion of the journey, tracing the traversed region along the land road until reaching Attalia, where they sailed to Seleucia, the sea port of Antioch in Syria (verses 24–26). The missionary church received a 'formal report' on the accomplished work (verses 26–27), especially the opening of a 'door of faith' for the Gentiles (cf. 2 Corinthians 2:12).

== See also ==
- Antioch, Pisidia
- Antioch, Syria
- Attalia
- Barnabas
- Derbe, Lycaonia
- Hermes
- Iconium, Frygia
- Lystra, Lycaonia
- Perga, Pamphylia
- Paul the Apostle
- Timothy
- Zeus
- Other related Bible parts: Acts 13, 2 Timothy 3

== Sources ==
- Alexander, Loveday (2007). "62. Acts". In Barton, John; Muddiman, John (eds.). The Oxford Bible Commentary (first (paperback) ed.). Oxford University Press. pp. 1028–1061. ISBN 978-0199277186.
- Coogan, Michael David (2007). Coogan, Michael David; Brettler, Marc Zvi; Newsom, Carol Ann; Perkins, Pheme (eds.). The New Oxford Annotated Bible with the Apocryphal/Deuterocanonical Books: New Revised Standard Version, Issue 48 (Augmented 3rd ed.). Oxford University Press. ISBN 9780195288810.
