= Isaiah 57 =

Book of Isaiah, chapter 57

- ← chapter 56 chapter 58 →
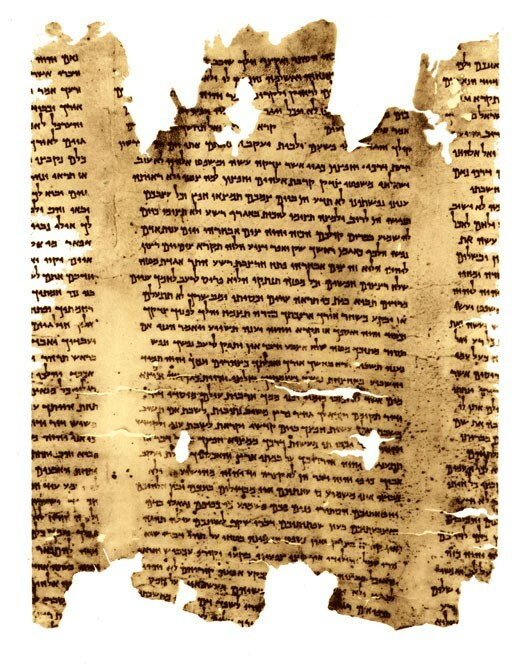
- Isaiah 57:17–59:9 in a part of Isaiah Scroll 1QIsa^{b} (made before 100 BCE) among the Dead Sea Scrolls at Qumran.
- Book: Book of Isaiah
- Hebrew Bible part: Nevi'im
- Order in the Hebrew part: 5
- Category: Latter Prophets
- Christian Bible part: Old Testament
- Order in the Christian part: 23

Isaiah 57 is the fifty-seventh chapter of the Book of Isaiah in the Hebrew Bible or the Old Testament of the Christian Bible. This book contains the prophecies attributed to the prophet Isaiah, and is one of the Books of the Prophets. Chapter 57 is the second chapter of the final section of the Book of Isaiah, often referred to as Trito-Isaiah.

== Text ==
The original text was written in Hebrew language. This chapter is divided into 21 verses.

=== Textual witnesses ===
Some early manuscripts containing the text of this chapter in Hebrew are of the Masoretic Text tradition, which includes the Codex Cairensis (895), the Petersburg Codex of the Prophets (916), Aleppo Codex (10th century), Codex Leningradensis (1008).

Fragments containing parts of this chapter were found among the Dead Sea Scrolls (3rd century BC or later):

- 1QIsa^{a}: with all verses (1–21)
- 1QIsa^{b}: extant verses 1–4, 17–21
- 4QIsa^{d} (4Q58): extant verses 9–21
- 4QIsa^{h} (4Q62): extant verses 5–8

There is also a translation into Koine Greek known as the Septuagint, made in the last few centuries BCE. Extant ancient manuscripts of the Septuagint version include Codex Vaticanus (B; $\mathfrak{G}$^{B}; 4th century), Codex Sinaiticus (S; BHK: $\mathfrak{G}$^{S}; 4th century), Codex Alexandrinus (A; $\mathfrak{G}$^{A}; 5th century) and Codex Marchalianus (Q; $\mathfrak{G}$^{Q}; 6th century).

== Parashot ==
The parashah sections listed here are based on the Aleppo Codex. Isaiah 57 is a part of the Consolations (Isaiah 40–66). {P}: open parashah; {S}: closed parashah.

[{P} 56:10-12] 57:1-2 {S} 57:3-14 {S} 57:15-21 {P}

== Israel's futile idolatry (57:1–13) ==
Verses 1–2 contain awkward shifts between singular and plural, contrasting a group whom the prophetic tradition approves and others who are strongly condemned. Those being detested get more detailed attention with their parentage attacked (verse 3), their behavior deemed childish (verse 4) and their evil practices spelt out at length, including sexual offences as well as child-sacrifice (verse 5), which were regarded idolatrous (recalling the continuous danger of prostitution of the city described in Isaiah 1:21–23). Verses 11–13 continue the condemnation, ending with a 'mockery of idols' resembling that in chapters 44 and 45, but also assert the 'impregnable position of those who take refuge in YHWH'.

=== Verses 1–2 ===
^{1} The righteous perishes,
And no man takes it to heart;
Merciful men are taken away,
While no one considers
That the righteous is taken away from evil.
^{2} He shall enter into peace;
They shall rest in their beds,
Each one walking in his uprightness.

- "The righteous" (KJV, NASB, NIV, NKJV, NLT, NRSV): or "the just man" (NAB); "Good people" (TEV); "The godly" (NET Bible).
- "Evil" or "the face of evil"

These verses complain the (apparently violent) death of the righteous that went 'unnoticed and unlamented'.

=== Verse 13 ===
When you cry out,

let your collection of idols deliver you.

But the wind shall carry them all away,

a breath shall take them away.

But he who puts his trust in Me

shall possess the land
and shall inherit My holy mountain.

- "Holy mountain": this term recalls Isaiah 56:7 with the aspirations for the Temple, and of Isaiah 11:9 with the picture of paradise restored.

The concluding promise, typical in Isaiah's polemic, is addressed to those who trust in the Lord (cf. Isaiah 30:18) who would 'gain title to land and control of the Jerusalem Temple'.

== Healing for the contrite (57:14–21) ==
The double imperative in verse 14 recalls the series of such usages in chapters 49–55 to indicate the consoling contents of this section ending with an assurance of God's continuing presence with the contrite and humble, a strong contrast with the earlier passage. Verses 19–20 provide a clear distinction between those accepted by God and 'the wicked', and the refrain, also found in Isaiah 48:22, fits naturally into its context.

=== Verse 14 ===
And it shall be said,

"Build up, build up, prepare the way,

take up every stumbling block out of the way of My people."

- "Prepare the way": applied somewhat differently than the image of the highway of salvation in Isaiah 40:3 (cf. Isaiah 62:10), as in this verse it seems to be figurative for 'the removal of spiritual obstacles to the redemption of Israel' (Isaiah 57:17).

=== Verse 15 ===
For thus says the High and Lofty One

who inhabits eternity, whose name is Holy:

I dwell in the high and holy place

and also with him who is of a contrite and humble spirit,

to revive the spirit of the humble,

and to revive the heart of the contrite ones.

God's presence with the 'downtrodden and marginalized' (Isaiah 66:1–2) is associated with God's transcendence in Isaiah's vision ('the high and lofty one... whose name is Holy'; cf. Isaiah 6:1–5).

=== Verse 17 ===
For the iniquity of his covetousness was I wroth, and smote him: I hid me, and was wroth, and he went on frowardly in the way of his heart.

- "Frowardly" (cf. Jeremiah 3:14; Jeremiah 3:22; Jeremiah 31:22; Jeremiah 49:4): literally, "turning away" (RSV margin), "turning back" or "backsliding".

=== Verse 19 ===
by creating the fruit of the lips.

Peace, peace to him who is far off and to him who is near,

says the Lord, and I will heal him.

Peace is offered to them that are 'nigh' ("near"), and to them that are 'afar off', applied by Paul as "not only to the Jew, but also to the Gentile" in Ephesians 2:13; 2:17 (cf. Acts 2:39).

== See also ==
- Sheol
- Related Bible parts: Isaiah 6, Isaiah 66, Ephesians 2.

== Sources ==
- Coggins, R (2007). "22. Isaiah". In Barton, John; Muddiman, John (eds.). The Oxford Bible Commentary (first (paperback) ed.). Oxford University Press. pp. 433–486. ISBN 978-0199277186.
- Coogan, Michael David (2007). Coogan, Michael David; Brettler, Marc Zvi; Newsom, Carol Ann; Perkins, Pheme (eds.). The New Oxford Annotated Bible with the Apocryphal/Deuterocanonical Books: New Revised Standard Version, Issue 48 (Augmented 3rd ed.). Oxford University Press. ISBN 9780195288810.
- Ulrich, Eugene, ed. (2010). The Biblical Qumran Scrolls: Transcriptions and Textual Variants. Brill. ISBN 9789004181830.
- Würthwein, Ernst (1995). The Text of the Old Testament. Translated by Rhodes, Erroll F. Grand Rapids, MI: Wm. B. Eerdmans. ISBN 0-8028-0788-7.
