= Manaen =

Manaen may refer to:

- Manahen (also Manaen), teacher of the Church of Antioch and the foster brother of Herod Antipas
- King Manahem (fl. 8th century BC), king over Israel and the son of Gadi
