= Comama =

Human settlement

Coordinates: 37°20′N 30°27′E

Comama was a town in the late Roman province of Pamphylia Secunda. It has been called Pisidian, not as being in `Pisidia, but as founded on what was the Pisidian frontier of the Roman Empire.

== History ==
The full title of the town was Colonia Iulia Augusta Prima Fida Comama. The first term in this title indicates that it was founded as a colonia, an outpost established in conquered territory to secure it. The presence of the term Augusta indicates that it was founded after 27 BC, when the Roman senate granted that title to the victorious Octavian. Comama was one of a group of such settlements established in the area, which were linked by an imperial road called the Via Sebaste, one milestone of which (XLV) has been found at Comama. The milestones were set up in about 6 BC, an indication of the date of foundation of Comama.

The site was at Şerefönü in present-day Turkey.

Comama minted coins, including some in the reigns of Marcus Aurelius and Antoninus Pius, whose heads figure on the coins.

== Bishopric ==
The bishopric of Comama was a suffragan of the metropolitan see of Perge, the capital of Pamphylia Secunda.

The acts of the First Council of Constantinople (381) were signed by a bishop of Comama of the province of Pamphylia named Hesychius. The bishop Hephaestus (Ephesius according to some manuscripts) who was one of the signatories of the joint letter that in 458 the bishops of the province of Pamphylia Secunda sent to Byzantine Emperor Leo I the Thracian regarding the murder of Proterius of Alexandria and the adjectival form of whose see appears as Comaneus was probably bishop of Comama. There is no mention of Comama in the Notitiae Episcopatuum of the 7th and 10th centuries.

No longer a residential bishopric, Comama is today listed by the Catholic Church as a titular see.
