= Isaiah 55 =

Book of Isaiah, chapter 55

- ← chapter 54 chapter 56 →
- The Great Isaiah Scroll, the best preserved of the biblical scrolls found at Qumran from the second century BC, contains all the verses in this chapter.
- Book: Book of Isaiah
- Hebrew Bible part: Nevi'im
- Order in the Hebrew part: 5
- Category: Latter Prophets
- Christian Bible part: Old Testament
- Order in the Christian part: 23

Isaiah 55 is the fifty-fifth chapter of the Book of Isaiah in the Hebrew Bible or the Old Testament of the Christian Bible. This book contains the prophecies attributed to the prophet Isaiah, and is one of the Books of the Prophets. This chapter concludes the section of the Book of Isaiah often referred to as "Deutero-Isaiah" (chapters 40-55). It dates from the time of the Israelites' exile in Babylon. Albert Barnes suggests that "there is not to be found in the Bible a chapter more replete with rich invitations than this", adding "nor perhaps is there anywhere to be found one of more exquisite beauty".

== Text ==
The original text was written in Hebrew language. This chapter is divided into 13 verses.

=== Textual witnesses ===
Some early manuscripts containing the text of this chapter in Hebrew are of the Masoretic Text tradition, which includes the Codex Cairensis (895), the Petersburg Codex of the Prophets (916), Aleppo Codex (10th century), Codex Leningradensis (1008).

Fragments containing parts of this chapter were found among the Dead Sea Scrolls (3rd century BC or later):

- 1QIsa^{a}: complete
- 1QIsa^{b}: extant: verses 2‑13
- 4QIsa^{c} (4Q57): extant: verses 1‑6

There is also a translation into Koine Greek known as the Septuagint, made in the last few centuries BCE. Extant ancient manuscripts of the Septuagint version include Codex Vaticanus (B; $\mathfrak{G}$^{B}; 4th century), Codex Sinaiticus (S; BHK: $\mathfrak{G}$^{S}; 4th century), Codex Alexandrinus (A; $\mathfrak{G}$^{A}; 5th century) and Codex Marchalianus (Q; $\mathfrak{G}$^{Q}; 6th century).

== Parashot ==
The parashah sections listed here are based on the Aleppo Codex. Isaiah 55 is a part of the Consolations (Isaiah 40–66). {P}: open parashah; {S}: closed parashah.

{S} 55:1–5 {S} 55:6–13 {P}

== The Lord's "universal invitation" (verses 1-3) ==
=== Verse 1 ===
Ho, every one that thirsteth, come ye to the waters,

and he that hath no money; come ye, buy, and eat;

yea, come, buy wine and milk without money and without price.

In the Septuagint, this "invitation" reads:

Go to the water, ... go and buy.

The opening word "Ho", for example in the King James Version and the Revised Standard Version, is intended to indicate the importance of the subject being introduced.

=== Verse 3 ===
Incline your ear, and come unto me:

hear, and your soul shall live;

and I will make an everlasting covenant with you,

even the sure mercies of David.

This passage is cited by the Apostle Paul in a synagogue in Antioch, Pisidia, as recorded in Acts 13:34.

== Verse 6 ==
Seek the Lord while He may be found,

Call upon Him while He is near.

That the LORD may "still" be found is highlighted in several translations, such as the Jerusalem Bible (1966) and the Contemporary English Version (1995). Barnes writes of the implications here, that:

1. God may now be found
2. [But] the time will come when it will be impossible to obtain God's favor.

As a messianic text,

The leading thought is, that ... the offer of salvation will be made to people fully and freely. But the period will come when it will be withdrawn. If God forsakes human beings; if he wholly withdraws his Spirit; if they have committed the sin which hath never forgiveness; or if they neglect or despise the provisions of mercy and die in their sins, it will be too late, and mercy cannot then be found. How unspeakably important, then, is it to seek for mercy at once - lest, slighted now, the offer should be withdrawn. or lest death should Overtake us.

This verse is commonly seen as relating to prayer and is used for Rogate Sunday in the Lutheran tradition.

== God's words are powerful (verses 8–11) ==
=== Verse 8 ===
For my thoughts are not your thoughts,

neither are your ways my ways,

saith the Lord.

=== Verse 9 ===
For as the heavens are higher than the earth,

so are my ways higher than your ways,

and my thoughts than your thoughts.

Anglican bishop Robert Lowth argues that the comparative "higher" is an incorrect translation here, stating this verse instead as:

For as the heavens are high above the earth.

=== Verses 10–11 ===
^{10}For as the rain comes down, and the snow from heaven,

and do not return there but water the earth and make it bring forth and bud

that it may give seed to the sower and bread to the eater,

^{11}so shall My word be that goes forth from My mouth;

it shall not return to Me void, but it shall accomplish that which I please,

and it shall prosper in the thing for which I sent it.

The theme of verses 10 and 11 is closely comparable to Isaiah 40:8, and together these form an 'inclusio', bracketing the section comprising chapters 40–55, as 'the end matching the beginning'.

== God's people will celebrate (verses 12–13) ==
For you shall go out in joy

and be led forth in peace ...

"Paradise regained" is a recurring theme in the Book of Isaiah. After the transformation of animal life in Isaiah 11:6–9, plant life is here transformed. from the "briers and thorns" which threaten agriculture in Isaiah 5:6 (the failing grapes) and elsewhere, to become cypress and myrtle (cf. Isaiah 41:19) in praise of God.

== See also ==
- David
- Related Bible parts: Isaiah 63, Matthew 5, John 7, Acts 13

== Sources ==
- Coggins, R (2007). "22. Isaiah". In Barton, John; Muddiman, John (eds.). The Oxford Bible Commentary (first (paperback) ed.). Oxford University Press. pp. 433–486. ISBN 978-0199277186.
- Ulrich, Eugene, ed. (2010). The Biblical Qumran Scrolls: Transcriptions and Textual Variants. Brill. ISBN 9789004181830.
- Würthwein, Ernst (1995). The Text of the Old Testament. Translated by Rhodes, Erroll F. Grand Rapids, MI: Wm. B. Eerdmans. ISBN 0-8028-0788-7.
