= Simeon Niger =

Character in the New Testament

Saint Simeon Niger
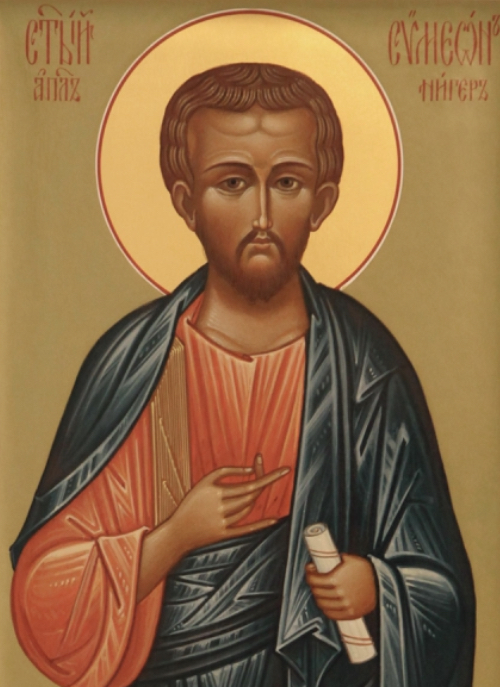
- Honored in: All Christian denominations that venerate saints

Simon Niger is a person in the Book of Acts in the New Testament. He is mentioned in Acts 13:1 as being one of the "prophets and teachers" in the church of Antioch:

In the church at Antioch there were prophets and teachers: Barnabas, Simon called Niger, Lucius of Cyrene, Manaen (who had been brought up with Herod the tetrarch) and Saul.

The nickname Niger is interpreted by some to mean "black", referring to a dark complexion or African descent, since niger is the Latin word for black.

Some commentators identify Simon as the same person as Simon of Cyrene, and Simon's son Rufus as the same person as Rufus named in Romans 16.
