= Lucius of Cyrene =

Ancient Roman saint

Saint Lucius of Laodicea
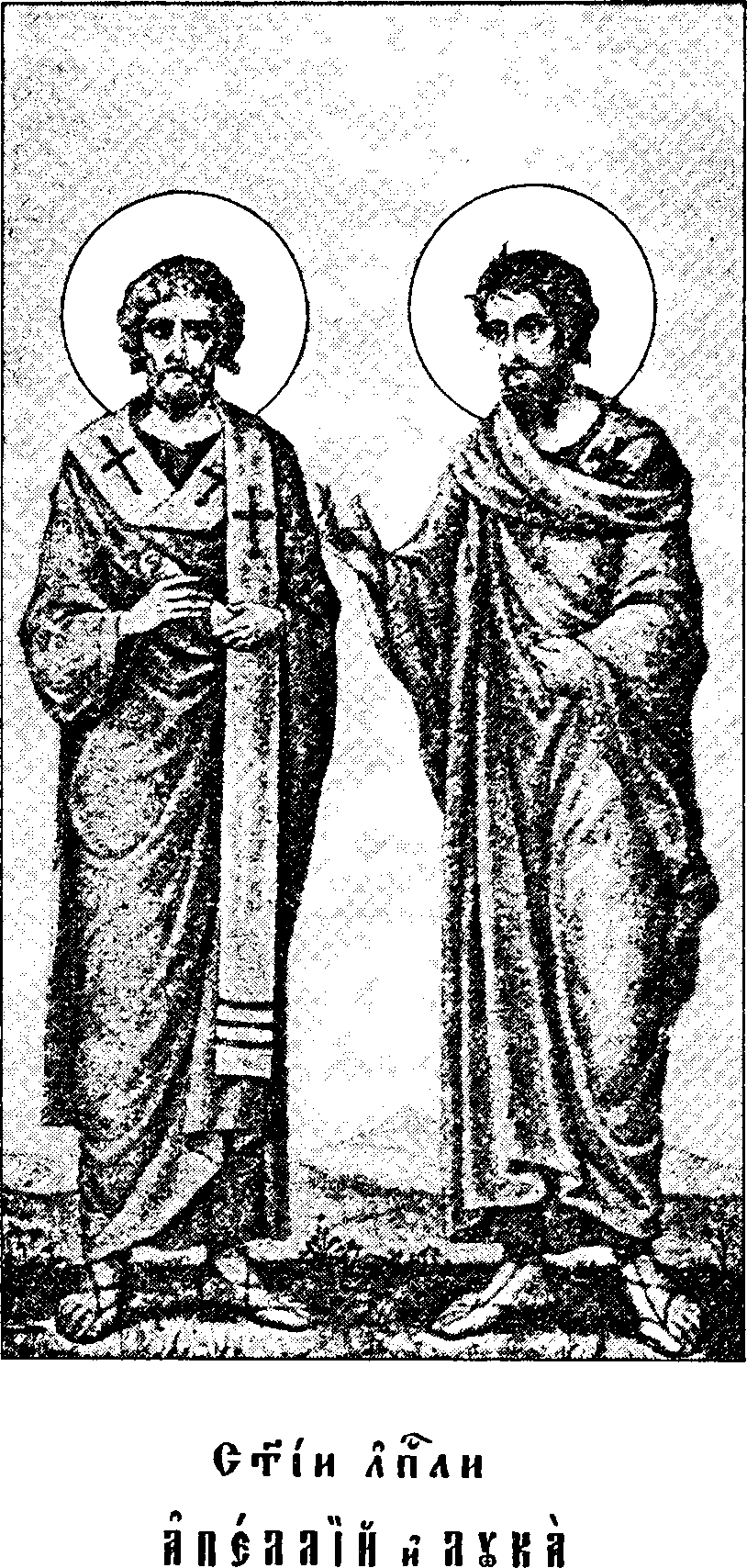

Apostle of the Seventy, Bishop of Laodicea
- Born: 1st century
- Died: 1st century (?)
- Venerated in: Eastern Orthodox Church; Roman Catholic Church
- Feast: 22 April (Eastern Orthodox); 6 May (Roman Catholic); 10 September (Eastern Orthodox)

Lucius of Laodicea (Greek: Λούκιος ὁ Κυρηναῖος, romanized: Loukios o Kurenaios), also known as Luke and Lucius of Cyrene, was, according to the Acts of the Apostles, one of the founders of the Christian Church in Antioch and according to Eastern Orthodox tradition, one of the Seventy Disciples. He is mentioned by name as a member of the church in Antioch, following the account of King Herod's death:

In the church at Antioch there were prophets and teachers: Barnabas, Simeon called Niger, Lucius of Cyrene, Manaen (who had been brought up with Herod the tetrarch) and Saul.

— Acts 13:1, NIV

The account in Acts 13 states that the group of prophets and teachers prayed and fasted, and were inspired to commission Barnabas and Paul to undertake missionary journeys further afield.

Lucius is indicated as a founder of the Antiochene church by inference from an earlier passage:

Now those who had been scattered by the persecution that broke out when Stephen was killed traveled as far as Phoenicia, Cyprus and Antioch, spreading the word only among Jews. Some of them, however, men from Cyprus and Cyrene, went to Antioch and began to speak to Greeks also, telling them the good news about the Lord Jesus.

— Acts 11:19,20 NIV

He is considered to have been one of the first bishops of Laodicea, or the first bishop of Cyrene.

There is also a Lucius mentioned in Romans 16:21. There is no way of knowing for sure whether this is the same person, but Origen identifies the Lucius in Romans with the evangelist Luke (Comm. Rom. 10.39)

== Veneration ==
Lucius is venerated as a saint in the Eastern Orthodox Church and Roman Catholic Church.

Lucius is commemorated on 22 April and 10 September in the Eastern Orthodox Church, along with Saints Apelles of Heraklion and Clement of Sardis. He is also commemorated on 4 January with the other Seventy Disciples.

According to the Roman Martyrology, Lucius' feast day is on 6 May.
