= Sarıhacılar, Akseki =

Village in Antalya Province

Sarıhacılar
- Neighbourhood
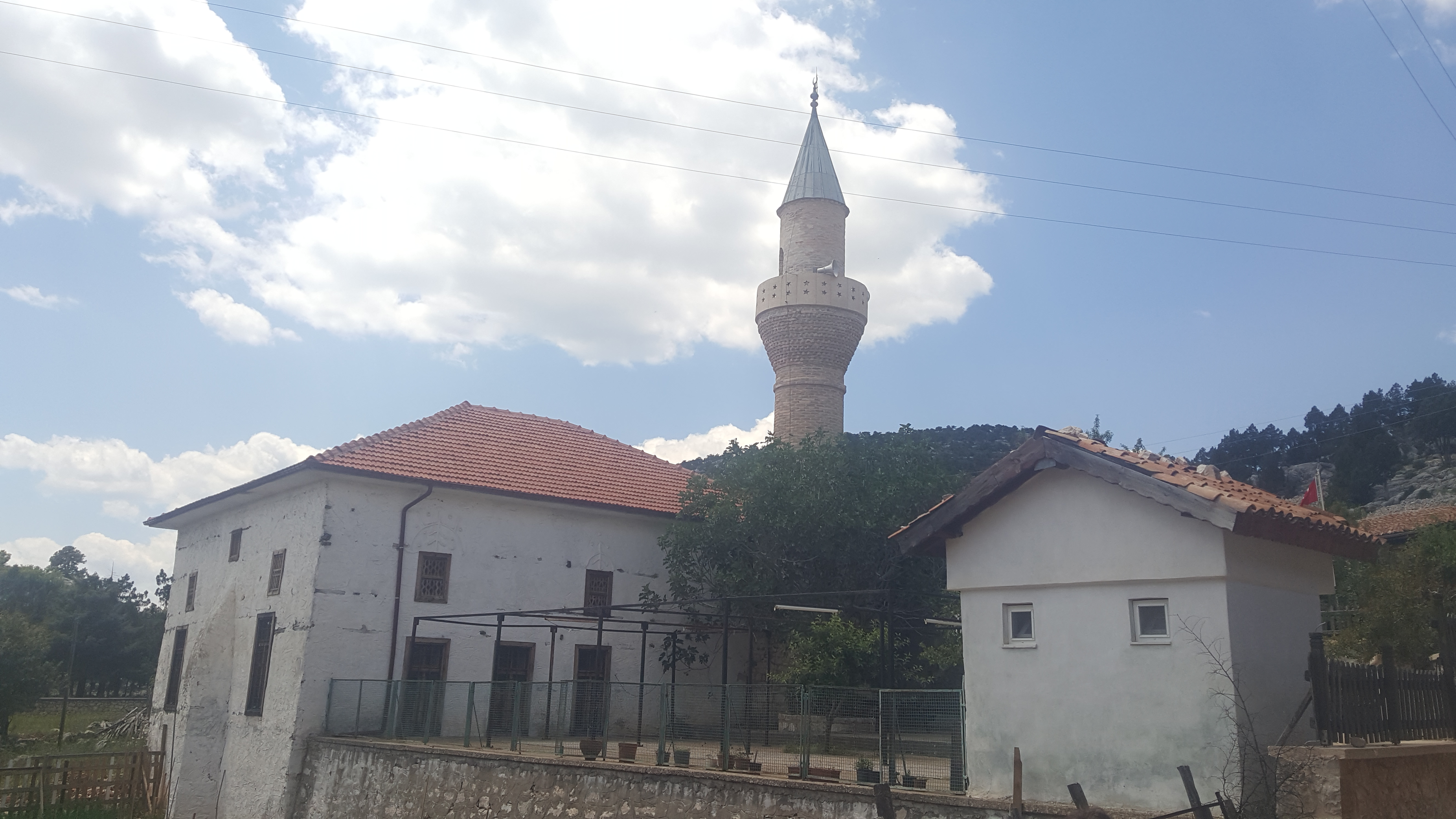

- Location within Turkey
- Coordinates: 37°01′N 31°46′E
- Country: Turkey
- Province: Antalya
- District: Akseki
- Population (2022): 609
- Time zone: UTC+3 (TRT)

Sarıhacılar is a neighbourhood in the municipality and district of Akseki, Antalya Province, Turkey. Its population is 609 (2022).

It is famous for its architectural structures called "buttoned houses." The village, which is an alternative tourism area, attracts the attention of visitors due to its old mosque and museum as well as its buttoned houses. Sarıhacılar was registered as a "Cultural Asset to be Protected" by the Antalya Regional Board for the Protection of Cultural and Natural Assets in 2007.

== Gallery ==
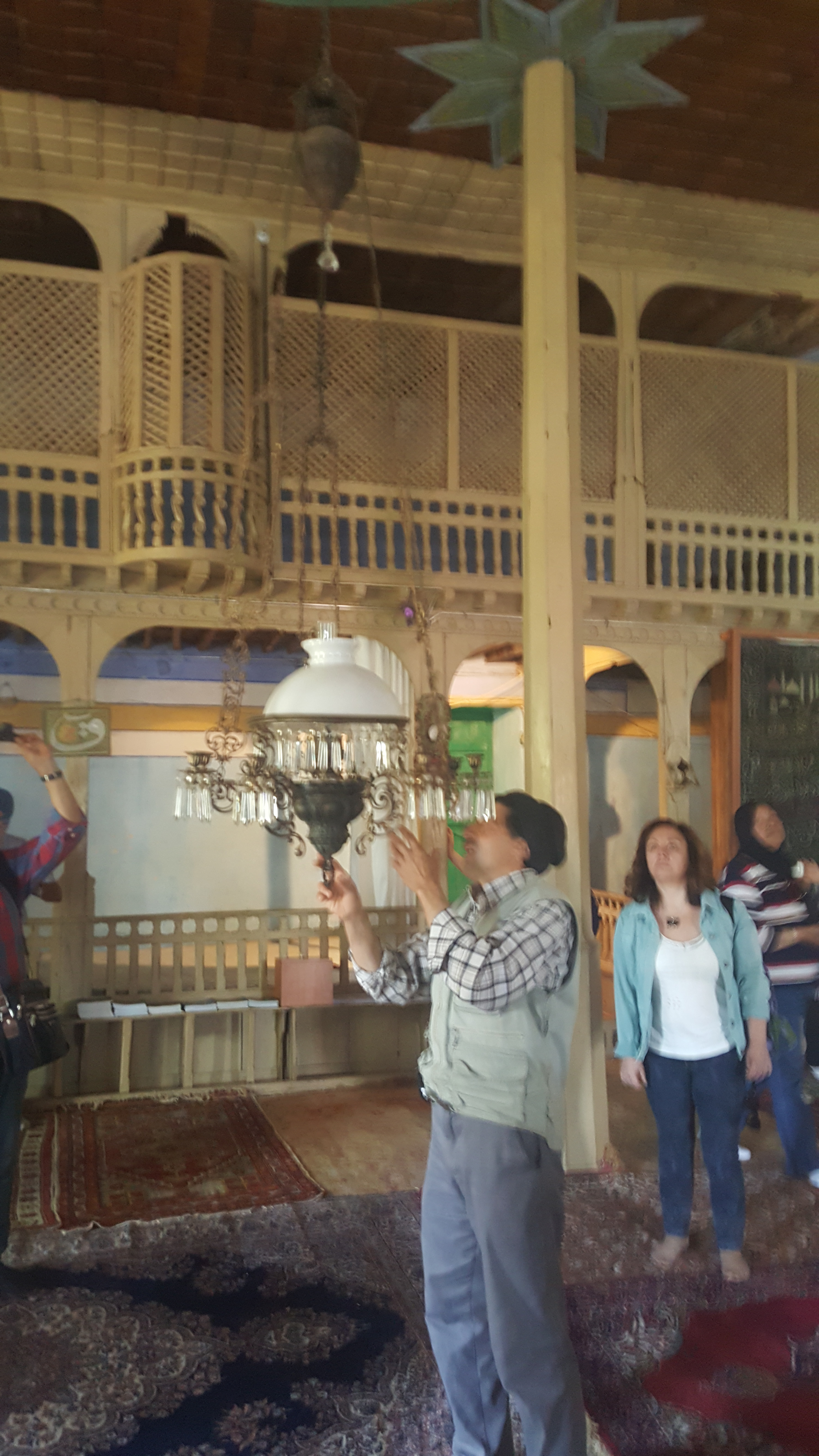
Historic mosque of the village

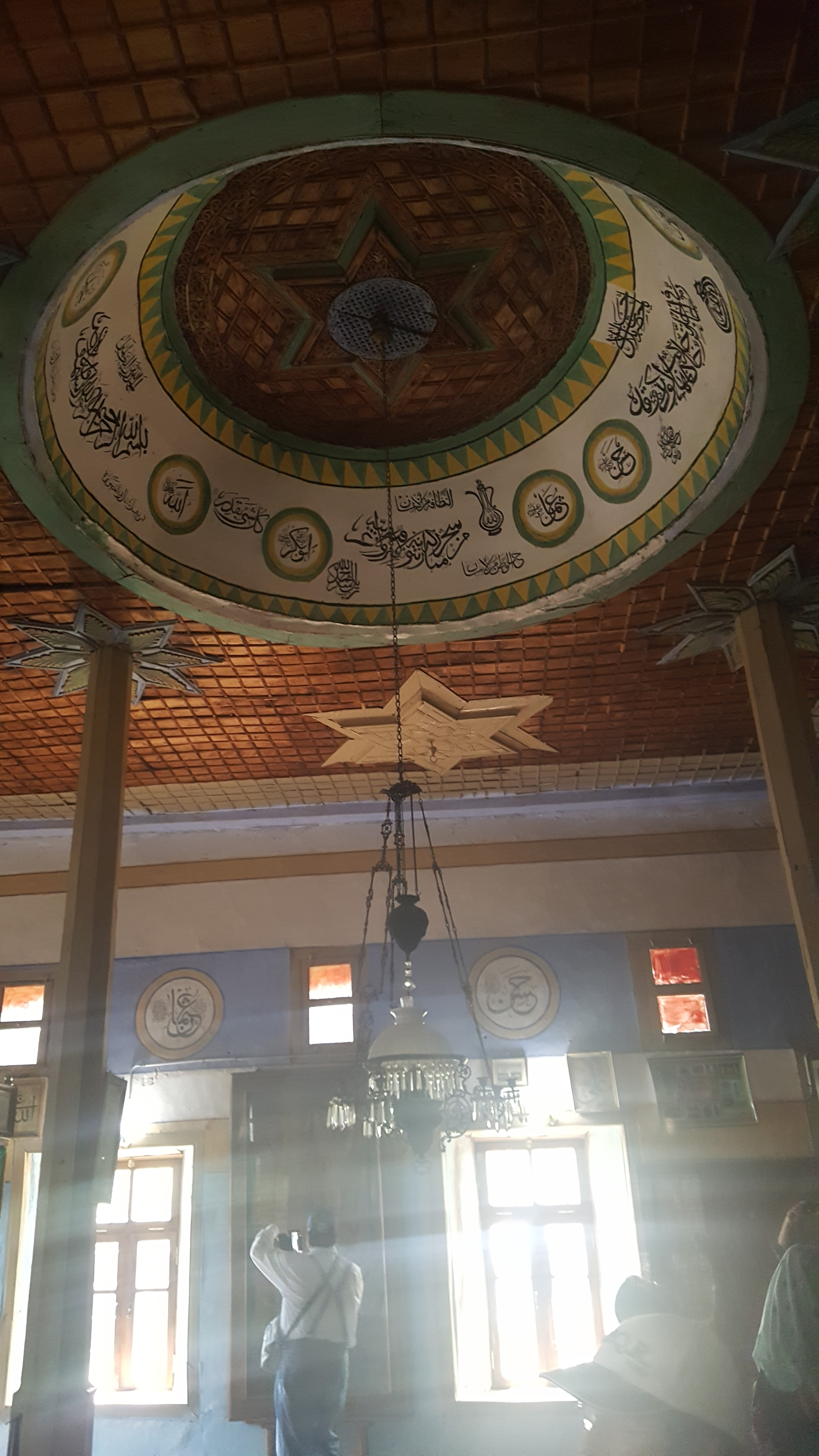
Interior of the historic mosque of the village

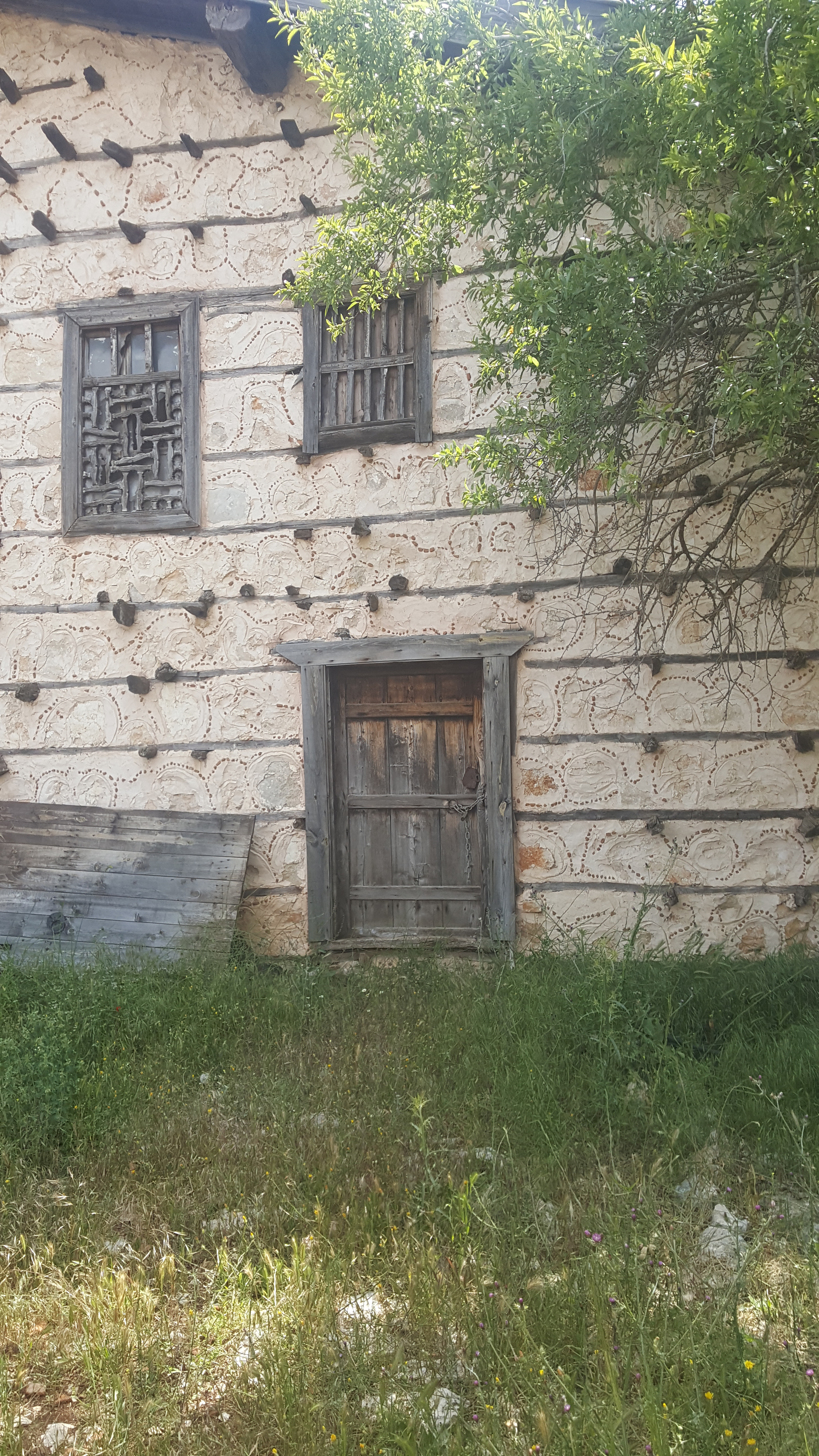
Example of traditional Akseki houses called "button" houses

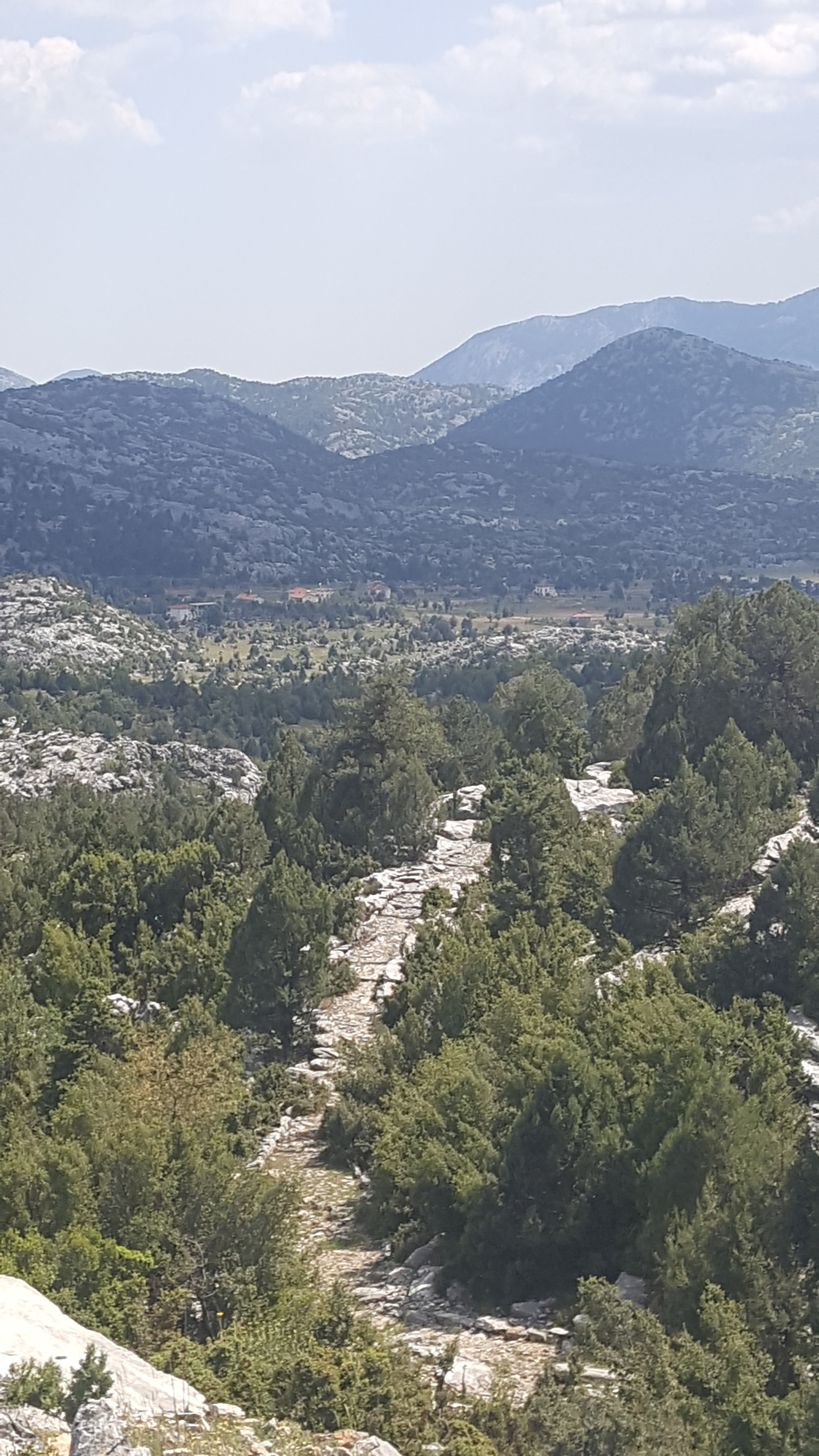
Via Sebaste

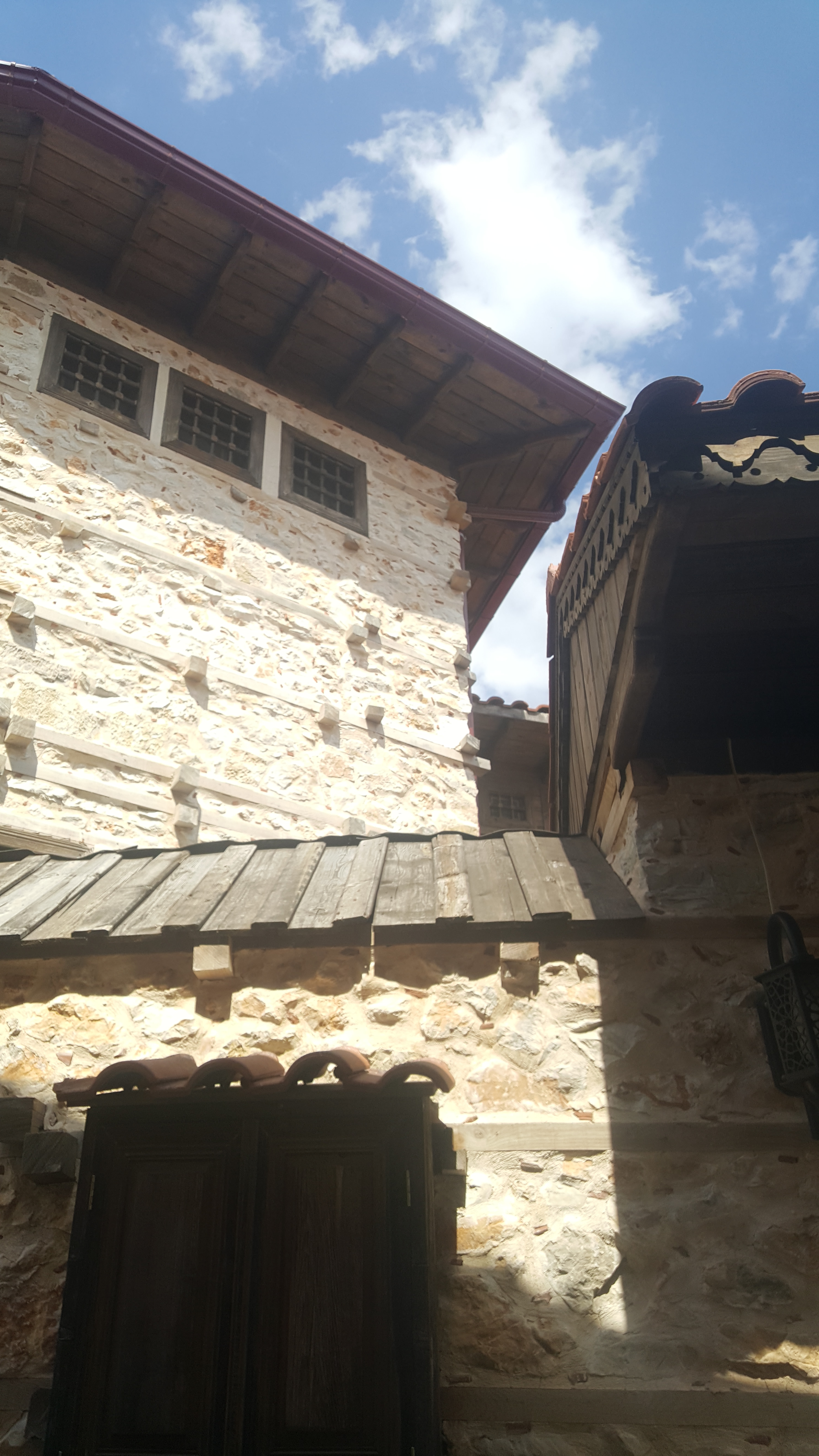
Museum of Ethnography
