= Isaiah 63 =

Book of Isaiah, chapter 63

- ← chapter 62 chapter 64 →
- The Great Isaiah Scroll, the best preserved of the biblical scrolls found at Qumran from the second century BC, contains all the verses in this chapter.
- Book: Book of Isaiah
- Hebrew Bible part: Nevi'im
- Order in the Hebrew part: 5
- Category: Latter Prophets
- Christian Bible part: Old Testament
- Order in the Christian part: 23

Isaiah 63 is the sixty-third chapter of the Book of Isaiah in the Hebrew Bible or the Old Testament of the Christian Bible. This book contains the prophecies attributed to the prophet Isaiah, and is one of the Books of the Prophets. Chapters 56-66 are often referred to as Trito-Isaiah.

== Text ==
The original text was written in the Hebrew language. This chapter is divided into 19 verses.

=== Textual witnesses ===
Some early manuscripts containing the text of this chapter in Hebrew are of the Masoretic Text tradition, which includes the Codex Cairensis (895), the Petersburg Codex of the Prophets (916), Aleppo Codex (10th century), Codex Leningradensis (1008).

Fragments containing parts of this chapter were found among the Dead Sea Scrolls (3rd century BC or later):

- 1QIsa^{a}: complete
- 1QIsa^{b}: extant: verses 1‑9, 11‑19

There is also a translation into Koine Greek known as the Septuagint, made in the last few centuries BCE. Extant ancient manuscripts of the Septuagint version include Codex Vaticanus (B; $\mathfrak{G}$^{B}; 4th century), Codex Sinaiticus (S; BHK: $\mathfrak{G}$^{S}; 4th century), Codex Alexandrinus (A; $\mathfrak{G}$^{A}; 5th century) and Codex Marchalianus (Q; $\mathfrak{G}$^{Q}; 6th century).

== Parashot ==
The parashah sections listed here are based on the Aleppo Codex. Isaiah 63 is a part of the Consolations (Isaiah 40–66). {P}: open parashah; {S}: closed parashah.

{S} 63:1-6 {S} 63:7-19 [64:1-2 {S}]

== Verse 1 ==
Who is this that cometh from Edom,

with dyed garments from Bozrah?

this that is glorious in his apparel,

travelling in the greatness of his strength?

I that speak in righteousness,

mighty to save.

- "Dyed": from Hebrew: חמוץ, khă-mūts with the meaning of "be red" or "bright-red" not as "that of the scarlet dress worn by soldiers" (Nahum 2:3), but that of "blood just shed" (as in Revelation 19:13: "dipped in blood").

== Verse 16 ==
Doubtless thou art our father,

though Abraham be ignorant of us,

and Israel acknowledge us not:

thou, O Lord, art our father, our redeemer;

thy name is from everlasting.

The Jewish prayer Avinu Malkeinu invokes God as father, referring to this verse. Neither of the patriarchs, "Abraham" or "Israel" (meaning Jacob), would recognise the Israel addressed by the prophet; descent from them cannot guarantee the nation any protection.

== See also ==
- Abraham
- Bozrah
- Edom
- Related Bible parts: Isaiah 34, Isaiah 64

== Bibliography ==
- Würthwein, Ernst (1995). The Text of the Old Testament. Translated by Rhodes, Erroll F. Grand Rapids, MI: Wm. B. Eerdmans. ISBN 0-8028-0788-7.
