= Via Sebaste =

Roman military road

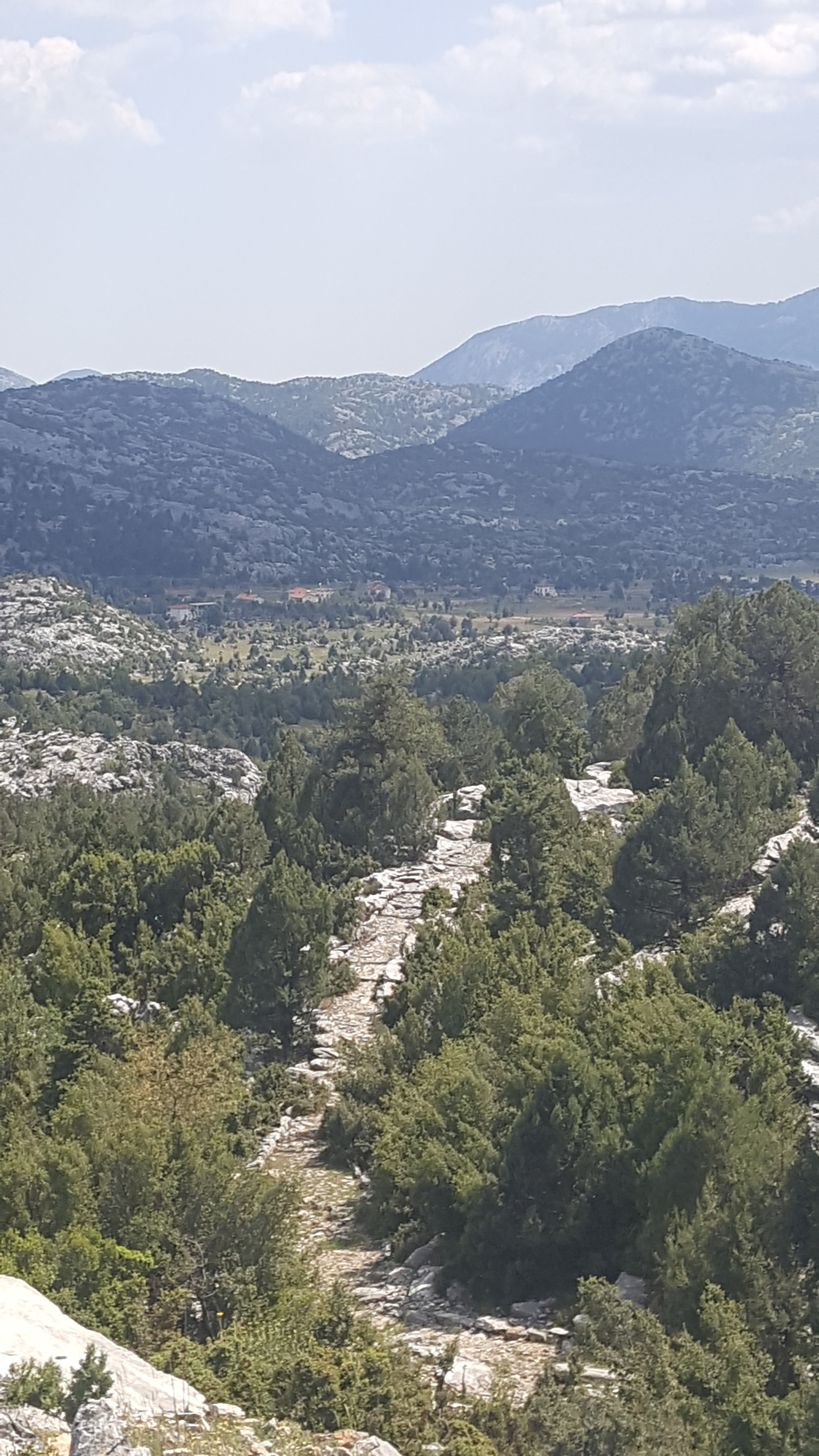
Remains of the Via Sebaste at Sarıhacılar

The Via Sebaste was a Roman military road in southern Anatolia. Its starting point (caput viae) was Pisidian Antioch on the central plateau, and it ran over the Taurus Mountains, through the Climax Pass (now Döşeme Boğazı) down to Perga on the coast. The Roman colonia of Comama and Apollonia lay along its route. There was an eastern branch that connected the colonia of Iconium and Lystra.

The Via Sebaste was the key to Roman control of Pisidia and its incorporation into the province of Galatia. It was completed in 6 BC by the Galatian governor Cornutus Arruntius Aquila. It was about 6 to 8 metres (20 to 26 ft) wide and capable of carrying wheeled traffic the whole way from Perga to Antioch. There are some surviving milestones. According to Acts 13:14, the early Christian missionary Paul of Tarsus traveled from Perga to Antioch on his first missionary journey. It is possible he took the Via Sebaste on that journey. The road underwent major repairs twice in the Roman period. In the Byzantine or Ottoman period, it was narrowed to 3 to 3.5 metres (9.8 to 11.5 ft) and stepped over the mountains. It remained in use until the 19th century.

== See also ==
- Via Domitia
- Via Egnatia

== Bibliography ==
- Belke, Klaus (2017). "Transport and Communication". In Philipp Niewöhner (ed.). The Archaeology of Byzantine Anatolia: From the End of Late Antiquity until Coming of the Turks. Oxford University Press. pp. 28–38.
- Mitchell, Stephen (2012). "Via Sebaste". In Simon Hornblower; Antony Spawforth; Esther Eidinow (eds.). The Oxford Classical Dictionary (4th ed.). Oxford University Press.
- Mitchell, Stephen; Wagner, Robert; Williams, Brian (2021). Roman Archaeology in a South Anatolian Landscape: The Via Sebaste, the Mansio in the Döşeme Boğazı, and Regional Transhumance in Pamphylia and Pisidia. With a Catalogue of Late Roman and Ottoman Cisterns. Koc University Press.
- Wilson, Mark (2009). "The Route of Paul's First Journey to Pisidian Antioch". New Testament Studies. 55 (4): 471–483. doi:10.1017/s002868850999004x.
