= Manahen =

1st century teacher of the Church of Antioch

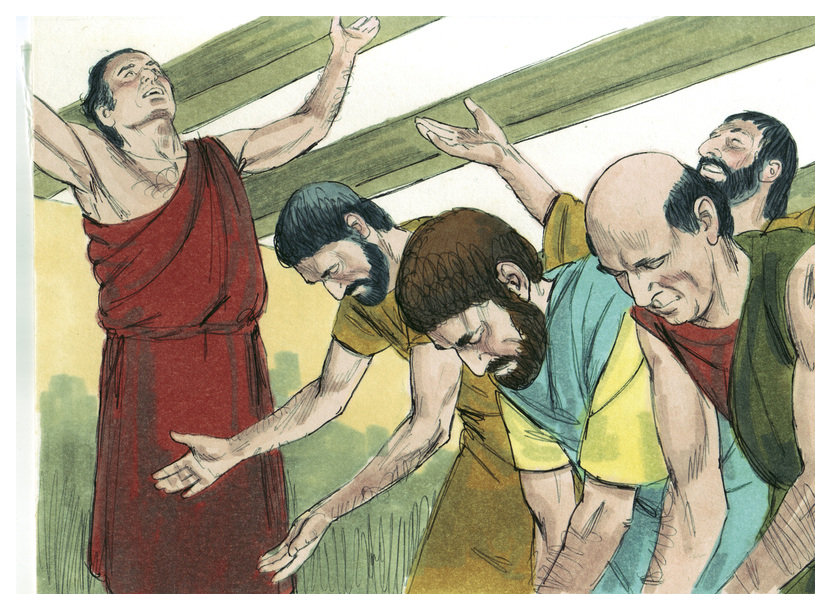
Manaen praying and fasting with Barnabas, Simeon Niger, Lucius of Cyrene, and Paul. illustrated by Jim Padgett

Manahen /ˈmæniən/ (also Manaen or Menachem) was a teacher in the first century Christian Church at Antioch who had been 'brought up' (Greek: σύντροφος, syntrophos, Vulgate: collactaneus) with Herod Antipas.

According to the Acts of the Apostles, he was among those who sent Paul and Barnabas on their first missionary journey. He was probably one of the founders of the church at Antioch.

== Biblical narrative ==
Little is known of Manahen's life. He is said to have been 'brought up' with Herod the tetrarch. He has been described as Herod's 'foster brother' or as his 'life-long friend'. According to the Acts of the Apostles he was one of the prophets and teachers who, under the influence of the Holy Spirit, laid hands upon Saul and Barnabas and sent the two apostles on the first of Paul's missionary journeys (Acts 13:1).

Saint Manahen
- Died: 1st century Antioch, Syria
- Honored in: Catholic Church; Eastern Orthodox Church; Oriental Orthodox Church
- Feast: May 23 (Eastern Orthodox Church); May 24 (Roman Catholic Church)

As Luke, the assumed author of the Acts of the Apostles, was an Antiochene, it is possible that Manahen was one of the "eyewitnesses and ministers of the word" (Luke 1:2) who provided Luke details which that writer has in regard to Antipas and other members of the Herodian family (Luke 3:1, 19, 20; 8:3; 9:7-9; 13:31, 32; 23:8-12; Acts 12). He may have become a disciple of Jesus with "Joanna, the wife of Chusa, Herod's steward" (Luke 8:3).

== Early historian references ==
In A.D. 39, Antipas left for Rome to gain the favor of Caligula, but instead received an order of perpetual exile. (Jos., "Ant.", XVIII, vii, 2). During this time, the Church of Antioch was founded by Jewish Christians, who "had been dispersed by the persecution that arose on the occasion of Stephen" and had taught the Gospel also to the Greeks of Antioch, (Acts 11:19-24). It is quite likely that St. Manahen was one of these founders of the Antiochene Church. The date of his death is unknown, but he is supposed to have died at Antioch in Syria.

== Veneration ==
Manahen is mentioned in many of the ancient Martyrologies.

His feast day is celebrated on May 23 in the Eastern Orthodox Church and on May 24 in the Roman Catholic Church.

== See also ==
- List of names for the Biblical nameless
- Saint Manahen, patron saint archive
