= 1QIsab =

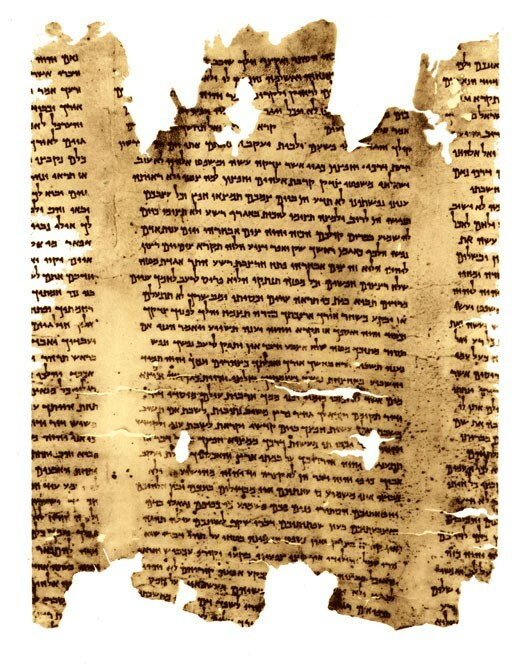
Photo showing part of 1QIsa^{b}, Isaiah 57:17 – 59:9.

1QIsa^{b} also known as the Hebrew University Isaiah Scroll is a fragmentary copy (75%) of the Book of Isaiah found at Qumran Cave 1 by Bedouin from the Ta'amireh tribe in 1947. It was discovered along with and grouped and sold together with two other Dead Sea Scrolls, the Thanksgiving Hymn and the War Scroll. Seven fragments of 1QIsa^{b} are also classified as 1Q8. It would have been written between 100-50 BC on parchment made of sheep skin with the Square Hebrew Script.

== History ==
Eleazar Sukenik purchased the scroll from an antiquities dealer in Bethlehem named Faidi Salahi, who had purchased the scroll from the Bedouin, on 21 December 1947. Much of the scroll is dark and blackened, preserved in multiple fragments, and in four major sheets that contain the upper section of the last third of the book. Paleography dates the scroll to the late Hasmonaean or early Herodian period in the first century BCE.

== Verses Included ==
The manuscript includes these verses.

Fragment or Column	Isaiah verse
Frag. 1 i	10:17-19
Frag. 2 i	13:16-19
Frag. 3 i	16:7-11
Frag. 4	19:20-21
Frag. 5	22:24-23:4
Frag. 6 i	26:1-5
Frag. 6 ii	28:15-20
Frag. 7	29:1-8
Frag. 8	30:10-14
Frag. 9	30:21-26
Frag. 10	35:4-5
Frag. 11	37:8-12
Col. I + Frag. 12	38:12-39:8; 40:2-3
Col. II	41:3-23
Col. III + Frag. 13	43:1-13; 23-27
Col. IV	44:21-45:13
Col. V	46:3-47:13
Col. VI	47:17-49:15
Col. VII	50:7-51:10
Col. VIII	52:7-54:6
Col. IX	55:2-57:4
Col. X	57:17-59:8
Col. XI	59:20-61:2
Col. XII	62:2-64:8
Col. XIII	65:17-66:24
