= Isaiah 56 =

Book of Isaiah, chapter 56

- ← chapter 55 chapter 57 →
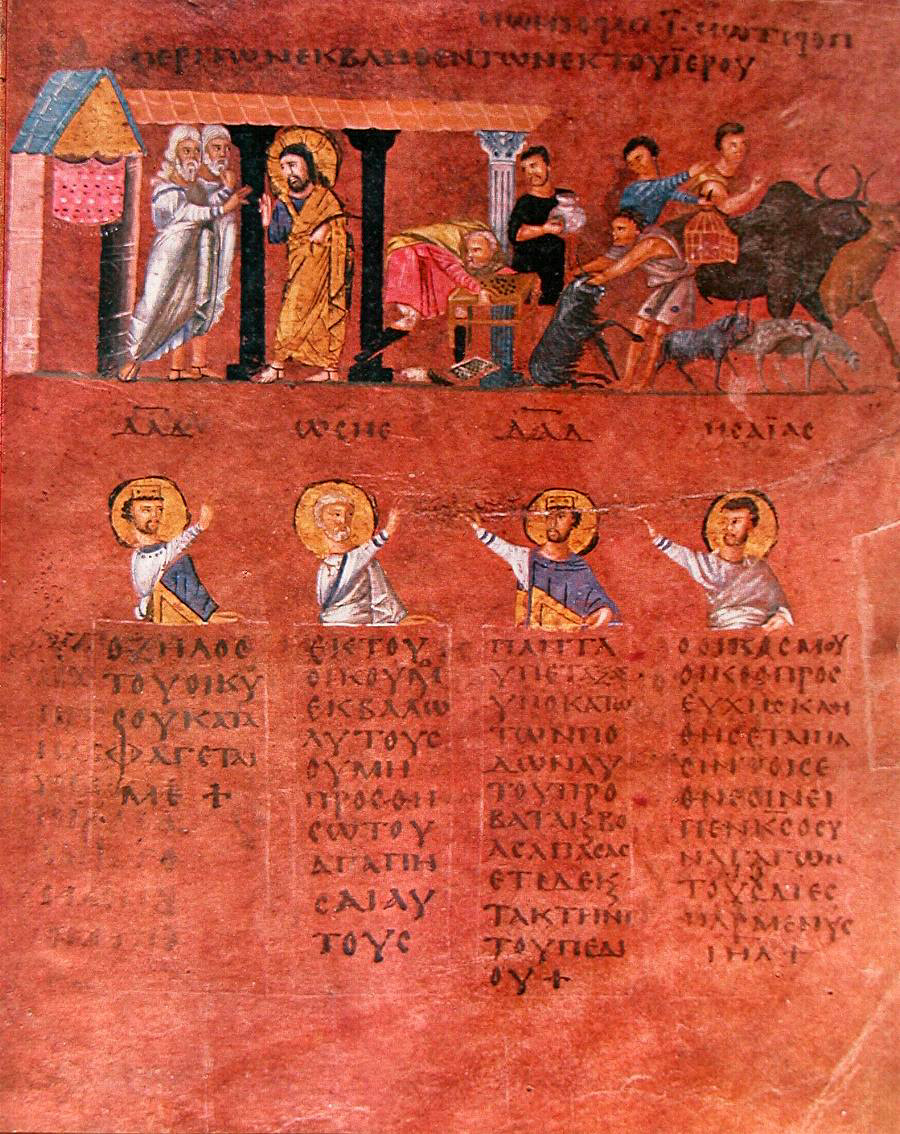
- The cleansing of the Temple, from the Rossano Gospels, 6th century. The verses cited below are Psalm 69:9, Hosea 9:15, Psalm 8:6–7, and Isaiah 56:7–8
- Book: Book of Isaiah
- Hebrew Bible part: Nevi'im
- Order in the Hebrew part: 5
- Category: Latter Prophets
- Christian Bible part: Old Testament
- Order in the Christian part: 23

Isaiah 56 is the fifty-sixth chapter of the Book of Isaiah in the Hebrew Bible or the Old Testament of the Christian Bible. This book contains the prophecies attributed to the prophet Isaiah, and is one of the Books of the Prophets. Chapter 56 is the first chapter of the final section of the Book of Isaiah, often referred to as Trito-Isaiah.

== Text ==
The original text was written in Hebrew language. This chapter is divided into 12 verses.

=== Textual witnesses ===
Some early manuscripts containing the text of this chapter in Hebrew are of the Masoretic Text tradition, which includes the Codex Cairensis (895), the Petersburg Codex of the Prophets (916), Aleppo Codex (10th century), Codex Leningradensis (1008).

Fragments containing parts of this chapter were found among the Dead Sea Scrolls (3rd century BC or later):

- 1QIsa^{a}: complete
- 1QIsa^{b}: extant: verses 1‑12
- 4QIsa^{h} (4Q62): extant: verses 7-8

There is also a translation into Koine Greek known as the Septuagint, made in the last few centuries BCE. Extant ancient manuscripts of the Septuagint version include Codex Vaticanus (B; $\mathfrak{G}$^{B}; 4th century), Codex Sinaiticus (S; BHK: $\mathfrak{G}$^{S}; 4th century), Codex Alexandrinus (A; $\mathfrak{G}$^{A}; 5th century) and Codex Marchalianus (Q; $\mathfrak{G}$^{Q}; 6th century).

== Parashot ==
The parashah sections listed here are based on the Aleppo Codex. Isaiah 56 is a part of the Consolations (Isaiah 40–66). {P}: open parashah; {S}: closed parashah.

{P} 56:1-2 {S} 56:3 {P} 56:4-5 {S} 56:6-9 {P} 56:10-12 [57:1-2 {S}]

== Verse 5 ==
Even unto them will I give in mine house

and within my walls a place and a name

better than of sons and of daughters:

I will give them an everlasting name,

that shall not be cut off.

This verse refers to eunuchs who, although they could not have children, could still live for eternity with the Lord.

- Jesus Christ speaks in similar way of this verse in Revelation 3:12

Him that overcometh will I make a pillar in the temple of my God, and he shall go no more out: and I will write upon him the name of my God, and the name of the city of my God, which is new Jerusalem, which cometh down out of heaven from my God: and I will write upon him my new name.

- The verse was the origin of the name of Yad Vashem (Hebrew: יָד וָשֵׁם, yād wā-šêm, literally, "a memorial and a name"), Israel's national Holocaust memorial.

== Verse 7 ==
Even them will I bring to my holy mountain,

and make them joyful in my house of prayer:

their burnt offerings and their sacrifices shall be accepted upon mine altar;

for mine house shall be called an house of prayer for all people.

Jesus combines the quotes from this verse and Jeremiah 7:11 in Matthew 21:13, (or the parallel verses: Mark 11:17 and Luke 19:46).

== See also ==
- Eunuch
- Related Bible parts: Jeremiah 7, Matthew 21, Mark 11, Luke 19, Acts 8, Revelation 3

== Bibliography ==
- Würthwein, Ernst (1995). The Text of the Old Testament. Translated by Rhodes, Erroll F. Grand Rapids, MI: Wm. B. Eerdmans. ISBN 0-8028-0788-7.
