= Isaiah 32 =

Book of Isaiah, chapter 32

- ← chapter 31 chapter 33 →
- The Great Isaiah Scroll, the best preserved of the biblical scrolls found at Qumran from the second century BC, contains all the verses in this chapter.
- Book: Book of Isaiah
- Hebrew Bible part: Nevi'im
- Order in the Hebrew part: 5
- Category: Latter Prophets
- Christian Bible part: Old Testament
- Order in the Christian part: 23

Isaiah 32 is the thirty-second chapter of the Book of Isaiah in the Hebrew Bible or the Old Testament of the Christian Bible. This book contains the prophecies attributed to the prophet Isaiah, and is one of the Books of the Prophets. The Jerusalem Bible groups chapters 28-35 together as a collection of "poems on Israel and Judah". Unlike the previous chapters, this chapter makes no reference to "the overthrow of the Assyrians".

== Text ==
The original text was written in Hebrew language. This chapter is divided into 20 verses.

=== Textual witnesses ===
Some early manuscripts containing the text of this chapter in Hebrew are of the Masoretic Text tradition, which includes the Codex Cairensis (895), the Petersburg Codex of the Prophets (916), Aleppo Codex (10th century), Codex Leningradensis (1008).

Fragments containing parts of this chapter were found among the Dead Sea Scrolls (3rd century BC or later):

- 1QIsa^{a}: complete
- 1QIsa^{b}: extant: verses 17‑18, 20

There is also a translation into Koine Greek known as the Septuagint, made in the last few centuries BCE. Extant ancient manuscripts of the Septuagint version include Codex Vaticanus (B; $\mathfrak{G}$^{B}; 4th century), Codex Sinaiticus (S; BHK: $\mathfrak{G}$^{S}; 4th century), Codex Alexandrinus (A; $\mathfrak{G}$^{A}; 5th century) and Codex Marchalianus (Q; $\mathfrak{G}$^{Q}; 6th century).

== Parashot ==
The parashah sections listed here are based on the Aleppo Codex. Isaiah 32 is a part of the Prophecies about Judah and Israel (Isaiah 24–35). {P}: open parashah; {S}: closed parashah.

{P} 32:1-8 {S} 32:9-20 {S}

== Structure ==
The Cambridge Bible for Schools and Colleges describes verses 1 to 8 as "the ideal commonwealth of the Messianic Age" and dates this section "to the close of Isaiah’s ministry, when his mind was occupied with the hope of the ideal future".

== The Kingdom of Righteousness (32:1–8) ==
=== Verse 1 ===
Behold, a king shall reign in righteousness,

and princes shall rule in judgment.

== Warning to the women of Jerusalem (32:9–15) ==
This "threatening oration" is linked in the Jerusalem Bible to other "oracles of the return from exile". Verse 9 shows that "what roused the ire of the prophet was the careless unconcern and indifference of the women in face of the reiterated warnings he had uttered".

== The peace of God’s reign (32:16–20) ==
=== Verse 17 ===
And the work of righteousness shall be peace; and the effect of righteousness quietness and assurance for ever.

- "Quietness and assurance": "calmness and security"

== See also ==
- Jerusalem
- Related Bible parts: Psalm 16, Isaiah 9, Isaiah 11, Isaiah 16

== Sources ==
- Würthwein, Ernst (1995). The Text of the Old Testament. Translated by Rhodes, Erroll F. Grand Rapids, MI: Wm. B. Eerdmans. ISBN 0-8028-0788-7.
