= Isaiah 31 =

Book of Isaiah, chapter 31

- ← chapter 30 chapter 32 →
- The Great Isaiah Scroll, the best preserved of the biblical scrolls found at Qumran from the second century BC, contains all the verses in this chapter.
- Book: Book of Isaiah
- Hebrew Bible part: Nevi'im
- Order in the Hebrew part: 5
- Category: Latter Prophets
- Christian Bible part: Old Testament
- Order in the Christian part: 23

Isaiah 31 is the thirty-first chapter of the Book of Isaiah in the Hebrew Bible or the Old Testament of the Christian Bible. This book contains the prophecies attributed to the prophet Isaiah, and is one of the Books of the Prophets. The Jerusalem Bible groups chapters 28–35 together as a collection of "poems on Israel and Judah". Biblical commentators Keil and Delitzsch note that "again and again", Isaiah returns to the subject of Judah's alliance with Egypt, this chapter being a notable example.

== Text ==
The original text was written in Hebrew language. This chapter is divided into 9 verses.

=== Textual witnesses ===
Some early manuscripts containing the text of this chapter in Hebrew are found among the Dead Sea Scrolls, i.e., the Isaiah Scroll (1Qlsa^{a}; complete; 356-100 BCE), and of the Masoretic Text tradition, which includes Codex Cairensis (895 CE), the Petersburg Codex of the Prophets (916), Aleppo Codex (10th century), Codex Leningradensis (1008).

There is also a translation into Koine Greek known as the Septuagint, made in the last few centuries BCE. Extant ancient manuscripts of the Septuagint version include Codex Vaticanus (B; $\mathfrak{G}$^{B}; 4th century), Codex Sinaiticus (S; BHK: $\mathfrak{G}$^{S}; 4th century), Codex Alexandrinus (A; $\mathfrak{G}$^{A}; 5th century) and Codex Marchalianus (Q; $\mathfrak{G}$^{Q}; 6th century).

== Parashot ==
The parashah sections listed here are based on the Aleppo Codex. Isaiah 31 is a part of the Prophecies about Judah and Israel (Isaiah 24–35). {P}: open parashah; {S}: closed parashah.

{P} 31:1-3 {S} 31:4-9 {P}

== Analysis ==
Chapters 28–35 form a six-part unity, marked with the recurrence of the word 'Woe' or 'Ho!' (Isaiah 28:1; 29:1, 15; 30:1; 31:1; 33:1) with a balance between two sets of three woes: the first three offer 'principles of divine action', whereas the second three give 'matching applications to history and eschatology' as follows:

Principles	Applications
28:1–29	30:1–33
29:1–14	31:1–32:20
29:15–24	33:1–35:10

Chapters 30–32 specifically deals with Egypt and Assyrians while placing the Messianic kingdom alongside the downfall of Assyria (Isaiah 31:8–32:1; cf. Isaiah 10:33–11:1ff).

== Woe to those who trust Egypt (31:1–3) ==
This section reminds the futility of turning to Egypt for help, that was spoken in 30:1-5.

=== Verse 1 ===
Woe to them that go down to Egypt for help;
and stay on horses, and trust in chariots,
because they are many; and in horsemen, because they are very strong;
but they look not unto the Holy One of Israel, neither seek the Lord!

Deuteronomy 17:16–17 taught that the Israelite kings were not to keep many horses, marry many wives, or amass excess silver and gold.

- "Chariots...and... horsemen": evocative of the Exodus account, where

'Pharaoh's chariots and his army were cast into the sea' (Exodus 15:4).

== God will deliver Jerusalem (31:4–9) ==
=== Verse 4 ===
Robert Lowth's translation:

For thus hath JEHOVAH said unto me:
Like as the lion growleth,
Even the young lion, over his prey;
Though the whole company of shepherds be called together against him:
At their voice he will not be terrified,
Nor at their tumult will he be humbled:
So shall JEHOVAH God of Hosts descend to fight
For Mount Sion, and for his own hill.

The NIV and NKJV treat the reference to the shepherds' intervention as a parenthesis:

New International Version:

As a lion growls, a great lion over its prey —
and though a whole band of shepherds is called together against it, it is not frightened by their shouts or disturbed by their clamor —
so the Lord Almighty will come down to do battle on Mount Zion and on its heights.

== See also ==
- Assyria
- Egypt
- Israel
- Jerusalem
- Zion
- Related Bible parts: Deuteronomy 17, Hebrews 4

== Sources ==
- Coggins, R (2007). "22. Isaiah". In Barton, John; Muddiman, John (eds.). The Oxford Bible Commentary (first (paperback) ed.). Oxford University Press. pp. 433–486. ISBN 978-0199277186.
- Motyer, J. Alec (2015). The Prophecy of Isaiah: An Introduction & Commentary. InterVarsity Press. ISBN 9780830895243.
- Würthwein, Ernst (1995). The Text of the Old Testament. Translated by Rhodes, Erroll F. Grand Rapids, MI: Wm. B. Eerdmans. ISBN 0-8028-0788-7.
