= Isaiah 26 =

Book of Isaiah, chapter 26

- ← chapter 25 chapter 27 →
- The Great Isaiah Scroll, the best preserved of the biblical scrolls found at Qumran from the second century BC, contains all the verses in this chapter.
- Book: Book of Isaiah
- Hebrew Bible part: Nevi'im
- Order in the Hebrew part: 5
- Category: Latter Prophets
- Christian Bible part: Old Testament
- Order in the Christian part: 23

Isaiah 26 is the twenty-sixth chapter of the Book of Isaiah in the Hebrew Bible or the Old Testament of the Christian Bible. This book contains the prophecies attributed to the prophet Isaiah, and is one of the Books of the Prophets. Chapters 24–27 of Isaiah constitute one continuous poetical prophecy, sometimes called the "Isaiah Apocalypse".

== Text ==
The original text was written in Hebrew language. This chapter is divided into 21 verses.

=== Textual witnesses ===
Some early manuscripts containing the text of this chapter in Hebrew are of the Masoretic Text tradition, which includes the Codex Cairensis (895), the Petersburg Codex of the Prophets (916), Aleppo Codex (10th century), Codex Leningradensis (1008).

Fragments containing parts of this chapter were found among the Dead Sea Scrolls (3rd century BC or later):

- 1QIsa^{a}: complete
- 1QIsa^{b}: extant: verses 1–5
- 4QIsa^{b} (4Q56): extant: verses 1–5, 7–19

There is also a translation into Koine Greek known as the Septuagint, made in the last few centuries BCE. Extant ancient manuscripts of the Septuagint version include Codex Vaticanus (B; $\mathfrak{G}$^{B}; 4th century), Codex Sinaiticus (S; BHK: $\mathfrak{G}$^{S}; 4th century), Codex Alexandrinus (A; $\mathfrak{G}$^{A}; 5th century) and Codex Marchalianus (Q; $\mathfrak{G}$^{Q}; 6th century).

== Parashot ==
The parashah sections listed here are based on the Aleppo Codex. Isaiah 26 is a part of the Prophecies about Judah and Israel (Isaiah 24–35). {P}: open parashah; {S}: closed parashah.

{S} 26:1–10 {P} 26:11 {S} 26:12 {S} 26:13–15 {P} 26:16–19 {P} 26:20–21 {P}

== A song of salvation (26:1–6) ==
This section contains a psalm-like poem concerning a purified Jerusalem.

== God’s people anticipate vindication (26:7–21) ==
Verses 7–19 contain a so-called 'community lament', generally to entreat 'YHWH's favour at a time of distress' (cf. Psalm 74; 79), here describing 'the faithful community under alien rule, but still expressing its confidence that deliverance will come'.

Verses 20–21 form a link between the preceding lament and the material in the next chapter.

=== Verse 19 ===
Thy dead men shall live, together with my dead body shall they arise.

Awake and sing, ye that dwell in dust: for thy dew is as the dew of herbs, and the earth shall cast out the dead.

- "Thy dead men shall live": or "May Your dead live", is the opposite of what is written in verse 14 where the prayer is that "the wicked should not live, slackers shall not rise", but here is that "the righteous should live", that is, the corpses of God's people, 'who made themselves corpses' for God's sake, shall rise.

== See also ==
- Judah
- Related Bible parts: Isaiah 2, Isaiah 24, Isaiah 25, Isaiah 27, Jeremiah 48, Revelation 19, Revelation 21

== Sources ==
- Coggins, R (2007). "22. Isaiah". In Barton, John; Muddiman, John (eds.). The Oxford Bible Commentary (first (paperback) ed.). Oxford University Press. pp. 433–486. ISBN 978-0199277186.
- Coogan, Michael David (2007). Coogan, Michael David; Brettler, Marc Zvi; Newsom, Carol Ann; Perkins, Pheme (eds.). The New Oxford Annotated Bible with the Apocryphal/Deuterocanonical Books: New Revised Standard Version, Issue 48 (Augmented 3rd ed.). Oxford University Press. ISBN 9780195288810.
- Würthwein, Ernst (1995). The Text of the Old Testament. Translated by Rhodes, Erroll F. Grand Rapids, MI: Wm. B. Eerdmans. ISBN 0-8028-0788-7.
