= Isaiah 27 =

Book of Isaiah, chapter 27

- ← chapter 26 chapter 28 →
- The Great Isaiah Scroll, the best preserved of the biblical scrolls found at Qumran from the second century BC, contains all the verses in this chapter.
- Book: Book of Isaiah
- Hebrew Bible part: Nevi'im
- Order in the Hebrew part: 5
- Category: Latter Prophets
- Christian Bible part: Old Testament
- Order in the Christian part: 23

Isaiah 27 is the twenty-seventh chapter of the Book of Isaiah in the Hebrew Bible or the Old Testament of the Christian Bible. This book contains the prophecies attributed to the prophet Isaiah, and is one of the Books of the Prophets. Chapters 24-27 of Isaiah constitute one continuous poetical prophecy, sometimes called the "Isaiah Apocalypse".

== Text ==
The original text was written in Hebrew language. This chapter is divided into 13 verses.

=== Textual witnesses ===
Some early manuscripts containing the text of this chapter in Hebrew are found among the Dead Sea Scrolls, i.e., the Isaiah Scroll (1Qlsa^{a}; complete; 356-100 BCE), and of the Masoretic Text tradition, which includes Codex Cairensis (895 CE), the Petersburg Codex of the Prophets (916), Aleppo Codex (10th century), Codex Leningradensis (1008).

There is also a translation into Koine Greek known as the Septuagint, made in the last few centuries BCE. Extant ancient manuscripts of the Septuagint version include Codex Vaticanus (B; $\mathfrak{G}$^{B}; 4th century), Codex Sinaiticus (S; BHK: $\mathfrak{G}$^{S}; 4th century), Codex Alexandrinus (A; $\mathfrak{G}$^{A}; 5th century) and Codex Marchalianus (Q; $\mathfrak{G}$^{Q}; 6th century).

== Parashot ==
The parashah sections listed here are based on the Aleppo Codex. Isaiah 27 is a part of the Prophecies about Judah and Israel (Isaiah 24–35). {P}: open parashah; {S}: closed parashah.

{P} 27:1 {S} 27:2-6 {P} 27:7-11 {P} 27:12 {P} 27:13 {P}

== Verse 1 ==
The New King James Version treats verse 1 as the continuation of Isaiah 26:20–21, a section entitled "Take Refuge from the Coming Judgment".

In that day the Lord with his sore and great and strong sword

shall punish leviathan the piercing serpent,

even leviathan that crooked serpent;

and he shall slay the dragon that is in the sea.

The word "Leviathan" is capitalised in many English translations but lower case in the King James Version and American Standard Version.

== Verse 2 ==
New International Version

Sing about a fruitful vineyard

The Septuagint and some other manuscripts, followed by the Revised Standard Version and New Century Version, refer to a "pleasant vineyard". A. F. Kirkpatrick, in the Cambridge Bible for Schools and Colleges, prefers the word-order: "Pleasant vineyard! Sing ye of it".

== Verse 4 ==
Jerusalem Bible

I am angry no longer

King James Version

Who would set the briers and thorns against me in battle? I would go through them, I would burn them together.

The Good News Translation offers "I am no longer angry with the vineyard" as an interpretation of this verse. The Septuagint has a different text:

There is no woman that has not taken hold of it; who will set me to watch stubble in the field? Because of this enemy I have set her aside; therefore on this account the Lord has done all that he appointed.

== Verse 5 ==
Jerusalem Bible

Let them make their peace with me
Let them make their peace with me

The word-order differs in the Hebrew: יעשה שלום לי and then שלום יעשה לי in the second line.

== See also ==
- Assyria
- Brook of Egypt
- Jacob
- Jerusalem
- Leviathan
- Nile
- Related Bible parts: Job 41, Isaiah 2, Isaiah 24, Isaiah 25, Isaiah 26, Jeremiah 48, Revelation 19, Revelation 21

== Bibliography ==
- Würthwein, Ernst (1995). The Text of the Old Testament. Translated by Rhodes, Erroll F. Grand Rapids, MI: Wm. B. Eerdmans. ISBN 0-8028-0788-7.
