= Isaiah 25 =

Book of Isaiah, chapter 25

- ← chapter 24 chapter 26 →
- The Great Isaiah Scroll, the best preserved of the biblical scrolls found at Qumran from the second century BC, contains all the verses in this chapter.
- Book: Book of Isaiah
- Hebrew Bible part: Nevi'im
- Order in the Hebrew part: 5
- Category: Latter Prophets
- Christian Bible part: Old Testament
- Order in the Christian part: 23

Isaiah 25 is the twenty-fifth chapter of the Book of Isaiah in the Hebrew Bible or the Old Testament of the Christian Bible. This book contains the prophecies attributed to the prophet Isaiah, and is one of the Books of the Prophets. Chapters 24-27 of Isaiah constitute one continuous poetical prophecy, sometimes called the "Isaiah Apocalypse".

== Text ==
The original text was written in Hebrew language. This chapter is divided into 12 verses.

=== Textual witnesses ===
Some early manuscripts containing the text of this chapter in Hebrew are of the Masoretic Text tradition, which includes the Codex Cairensis (895), the Petersburg Codex of the Prophets (916), Aleppo Codex (10th century), Codex Leningradensis (1008).

Fragments containing parts of this chapter were found among the Dead Sea Scrolls (3rd century BC or later):

- 1QIsa^{a}: complete
- 1QIsa^{b}: extant: verses 1‑8
- 4QIsa^{c} (4Q57): extant: verses 1‑2, 8‑12

There is also a translation into Koine Greek known as the Septuagint, made in the last few centuries BCE. Extant ancient manuscripts of the Septuagint version include Codex Vaticanus (B; $\mathfrak{G}$^{B}; 4th century), Codex Sinaiticus (S; BHK: $\mathfrak{G}$^{S}; 4th century), Codex Alexandrinus (A; $\mathfrak{G}$^{A}; 5th century) and Codex Marchalianus (Q; $\mathfrak{G}$^{Q}; 6th century).

== Parashot ==
The parashah sections listed here are based on the Aleppo Codex. Isaiah 25 is a part of the Prophecies about Judah and Israel (Isaiah 24–35). {P}: open parashah; {S}: closed parashah.

{P} 25:1-5 {P} 25:6-8 {P} 25:9-12 {S}

== Verse 2 ==
The city will never be rebuilt

The Geneva Bible and King James Version have the text as "it shall never be built".

American theologian Albert Barnes writes:

"I suppose the whole scope of the passage requires us to understand this of Babylon. There has been, however, a great variety of interpretation of this passage. Grotius supposed that Samaria was intended. Calvin that the word is used collectively, and that various cities are intended. Piscator that Rome, the seat of antichrist, was intended. Jerome says that the Jews generally understand it of Rome. Aben Ezra and Kimchi, however, understand it to refer to many cities which they say will be destroyed in the times of Gog and Magog.

== Verse 4 ==
A shade from the heat

This idea is a little enlarged in Isaiah 32:2:

A man will be as a hiding place from the wind,
And a cover from the tempest
As rivers of water in a dry place,
As the shadow of a great rock in a weary land

and Psalm 121:5-6

The Lord is your keeper;
The Lord is your shade at your right hand.
The sun shall not strike you by day,
Nor the moon by night. https://biblehub.com/bsb/psalms/121.htm

== Verse 6 ==
And in this mountain shall the Lord of hosts make unto all people a feast of fat things,
a feast of wines on the lees, of fat things full of marrow, of wines on the lees well refined.

"This mountain" refers to Mount Zion, as it does also in Isaiah 2:2 and in verse 10 of this chapter. The King James Version refers to "wine on the lees", whereas more recent translations refer to "well-aged wines" (e.g. New Revised Standard Version) or "the finest wine" (Good News Translation).

"Lees" refers to deposits of dead yeast or residual yeast and other particles which precipitate, or are carried by the action of "fining", to the bottom of a vat of wine after fermentation and aging. Some contemporary wines (notably Chardonnay, Champagne and Muscadet) are sometimes aged for a time on the lees leading to a distinctive yeasty aroma and taste. "Fat things full of marrow" means special food for a banquet (to complement the "wines on the lees well refined") such as "prepared by Wisdom in Proverbs 9:1–6".

== See also ==
- Moab
- Mount Zion
- Related Bible parts: Isaiah 2, Isaiah 24, Isaiah 26, Isaiah 27, Jeremiah 48, Revelation 19, Revelation 21

== Bibliography ==
- Ulrich, Eugene, ed. (2010). The Biblical Qumran Scrolls: Transcriptions and Textual Variants. Brill.
- Würthwein, Ernst (1995). The Text of the Old Testament. Translated by Rhodes, Erroll F. Grand Rapids, MI: Wm. B. Eerdmans. ISBN 0-8028-0788-7.
