= John C. Trever =

- Born: November 26, 1916
- Died: April 29, 2006 (aged 89); Lake Forest, California, California
- Occupations: biblical scholar and archaeologist
- Known for: involvement in the discovery of the Dead Sea Scrolls
- Spouse: Elizabeth Trever
- Children: 2

Academic background
- Education: Yale Divinity School
- Alma mater: Yale Graduate School (PhD)

Academic work
- Discipline: Old Testament studies
- Notable works: The Untold Story of Qumran (1965)

John C. Trever (November 26, 1916 – April 29, 2006) was a Biblical scholar and archaeologist, who was involved in the discovery of the Dead Sea Scrolls.

== Education ==
Trever received a degree (B.D.) from Yale Divinity School and a Ph.D. in Old Testament studies from Yale Graduate School. He did post-doctoral studies in archaeology through the American School of Oriental Research in Jerusalem.

== Career ==
He became the first American scholar to see fragments of the Dead Sea Scrolls in the Spring of 1948. At the time Trever was filling in for Millar Burrows, the director at the American Schools of Oriental Research. He was contacted by a representative of Mar Samuel of St. Mark's Assyrian Orthodox Monastery who desired to authenticate three scrolls that we now know had been purchased from Kando, a Syrian-Christian antiquities dealer in Bethlehem. Trever, an experienced photographer, photographed the scrolls, Isaiah Scroll (1QIsaiahA), Habakkuk Commentary (1QpHabukkuk), and Community Rule (1QS), and immediately sent copies to Near East scholar William F. Albright, who recognized them as the "greatest MS discovery of modern times!”

Trever is the author of The Untold Story of Qumran (1965) and The Dead Sea Scrolls: A Personal Account (2003). He taught at several colleges: Baldwin-Wallace College in Ohio, Morris Harvey College in West Virginia (the University of Charleston), and Claremont School of Theology in California.

The original negatives are in the collection of the Ancient Biblical Manuscript Center of the Claremont School of Theology in California.

== Selected works ==
=== Book ===
- Trever, John C.; Brownlee, William Hugh; Burrows, Millar, eds. (1950). The Dead Sea Scrolls of St. Mark's monastery. Vol. I, The Isaiah manuscript and the Habakkuk commentary. New Haven, NJ: The American Schools of Oriental Research. OCLC 461196575.
- The Problem of Dating the Dead Sea Scrolls. Washington: Smithsonian Institution. 1954. OCLC 38486455.
- The Untold Story of Qumran. Westwood, NJ: Fleming H. Revell. 1965. OCLC 664188.
- On the Meaning of Biblical Prophecy. Position paper / Northeast Ohio Committee on Middle East Understanding. Vol. 2. Cleveland, OH: Northeast Ohio Committee on Middle East Understanding. 1971. OCLC 4356532.
- The Dead Sea Scrolls: a personal account. Grand Rapids, MI: Eerdmans. 1977. ISBN 978-0-802-81695-5. OCLC 799435349.
- The Bible and the Palestinian-Israeli Conflict. Claremont, CA: School of Theology at Claremont. 1983. OCLC 13240492.
