= Isaiah 33 =

Book of Isaiah, chapter 33

- ← chapter 32 chapter 34 →
- The Great Isaiah Scroll, the best preserved of the biblical scrolls found at Qumran from the second century BC, contains all the verses in this chapter.
- Book: Book of Isaiah
- Hebrew Bible part: Nevi'im
- Order in the Hebrew part: 5
- Category: Latter Prophets
- Christian Bible part: Old Testament
- Order in the Christian part: 23

Isaiah 33 is the thirty-third chapter of the Book of Isaiah in the Hebrew Bible or the Old Testament of the Christian Bible. This book contains the prophecies attributed to the prophet Isaiah, and is one of the Books of the Prophets. The Jerusalem Bible groups chapters 28-35 together as a collection of "poems on Israel and Judah".

== Text ==
The original text was written in Hebrew language. This chapter is divided into 24 verses.

=== Textual witnesses ===
Some early manuscripts containing the text of this chapter in Hebrew are of the Masoretic Text tradition, which includes the Codex Cairensis (895), the Petersburg Codex of the Prophets (916), Aleppo Codex (10th century), Codex Leningradensis (1008).

Fragments containing parts of this chapter were found among the Dead Sea Scrolls (3rd century BC or later):

- 1QIsa^{a}: complete
- 1QIsa^{b}: extant verse 1
- 4QIsa^{c} (4Q57): extant verses 2‑8, 16‑23

There is also a translation into Koine Greek known as the Septuagint, made in the last few centuries BCE. Extant ancient manuscripts of the Septuagint version include Codex Vaticanus (B; $\mathfrak{G}$^{B}; 4th century), Codex Sinaiticus (S; BHK: $\mathfrak{G}$^{S}; 4th century), Codex Alexandrinus (A; $\mathfrak{G}$^{A}; 5th century) and Codex Marchalianus (Q; $\mathfrak{G}$^{Q}; 6th century).

== Parashot ==
The parashah sections listed here are based on the Aleppo Codex. Isaiah 33 is a part of the Prophecies about Judah and Israel (Isaiah 24–35). {P}: open parashah; {S}: closed parashah.

{S} 33:1 {S} 33:2-6 {P} 33:7-9 {S} 33:10-12 {P} 33:13-24 {S}

== Verse 1 ==
New King James Version:

Woe to you who plunder, though you have not been plundered;
And you who deal treacherously, though they have not dealt treacherously with you!
When you cease plundering,
You will be plundered;
When you make an end of dealing treacherously,
They will deal treacherously with you.

== Verse 20 ==
New King James Version:

Zion, the city of our appointed feasts

The reference is to the three pilgrimage festivals of Pesach (Passover), Shavuot (Weeks or Pentecost), and Sukkot (Tabernacles, Tents or Booths) when the ancient Israelites living in the Kingdom of Judah would make a pilgrimage to the Temple in Jerusalem.

== Verses 21 and 23a ==
Revised Standard Version:

But there the Lord in majesty will be for us

a place of broad rivers and streams,
where no galley with oars can go,
nor stately ship can pass.
...

Your tackle hangs loose;

it cannot hold the mast firm in its place,
or keep the sail spread out.

These verses are interrupted by verse 22, which is better placed after verse 23a.

A marginal note in the Masoretic Text tradition indicates that verse 21 is the middle verse of the Book of Isaiah in Hebrew.

== Verse 22 ==
King James Version:

For the Lord is our judge,
the Lord is our lawgiver,
the Lord is our king;
he will save us.

The Jewish prayer Avinu Malkeinu invokes God as king, referring to this verse.

== See also ==
- Bashan
- Carmel
- Jerusalem
- Lebanon
- Sharon
- Zion
- Related Bible parts: James 4:12, Revelation 19, Revelation 20

== Bibliography ==
- Würthwein, Ernst (1995). The Text of the Old Testament. Translated by Rhodes, Erroll F. Grand Rapids, MI: Wm. B. Eerdmans. ISBN 0-8028-0788-7.
