= Isaiah 30 =

Book of Isaiah, chapter 30

- ← chapter 29 chapter 31 →
- The Great Isaiah Scroll, the best preserved of the biblical scrolls found at Qumran from the second century BC, contains all the verses in this chapter.
- Book: Book of Isaiah
- Hebrew Bible part: Nevi'im
- Order in the Hebrew part: 5
- Category: Latter Prophets
- Christian Bible part: Old Testament
- Order in the Christian part: 23

Isaiah 30 is the thirtieth chapter of the Book of Isaiah in the Hebrew Bible or the Old Testament of the Christian Bible. This book contains the prophecies attributed to the prophet Isaiah, and is one of the Books of the Prophets. The Jerusalem Bible groups chapters 28-35 together as a collection of "poems on Israel and Judah". The Cambridge Bible for Schools and Colleges describes this chapter as "a series of Oracles dealing with the Egyptian Alliance and its consequences; the present state and future prospects of Israel, and the destruction of the Assyrians".

== Text ==
The original text was written in Hebrew language. This chapter is divided into 33 verses.

=== Textual witnesses ===
Some early manuscripts containing the text of this chapter in Hebrew are of the Masoretic Text tradition, which includes the Codex Cairensis (895), the Petersburg Codex of the Prophets (916), Aleppo Codex (10th century), Codex Leningradensis (1008).

Fragments containing parts of this chapter were found among the Dead Sea Scrolls (3rd century BC or later):

- 1QIsa^{a}: complete
- 1QIsa^{b}: extant: verses 10‑15, 21‑27
- 4QIsa^{c} (4Q57): extant: verses 8‑17
- 4QIsa^{r} (4Q69^{b}): extant: verse 23

There is also a translation into Koine Greek known as the Septuagint, made in the last few centuries BCE. Extant ancient manuscripts of the Septuagint version include Codex Vaticanus (B; $\mathfrak{G}$^{B}; 4th century), Codex Sinaiticus (S; BHK: $\mathfrak{G}$^{S}; 4th century), Codex Alexandrinus (A; $\mathfrak{G}$^{A}; 5th century) and Codex Marchalianus (Q; $\mathfrak{G}$^{Q}; 6th century).

== Parashot ==
The parashah sections listed here are based on the Aleppo Codex. Isaiah 30 is a part of the Prophecies about Judah and Israel (Isaiah 24–35). {P}: open parashah; {S}: closed parashah.

{S} 30:1-5 {S} 30:6-11 {S} 30:12-14 {S} 30:15-18 {P} 30:19-26 {P} 30:27-33 {P}

== Futile Confidence in Egypt ==
In verses 1–7, Isaiah condemns King Hezekiah of Judah's reliance on negotiations with Egypt for support against the Assyrians. 2 Kings 18:17–25 records the Assyrians' delegation to Jerusalem which was also critical of Hezekiah's reliance on Egypt.

=== Verse 4 ===
For his princes were at Zoan

Zoan was a city of Egypt in the eastern Nile Delta.

=== Verse 6 ===
The burden against the beasts of the South.

Through a land of trouble and anguish,

From which came the lioness and lion,

The viper and fiery flying serpent,

They will carry their riches on the backs of young donkeys,

And their treasures on the humps of camels,

To a people who shall not profit.

Brenton's Septuagint Translation adds a sub-title calling this verse "the vision of the quadrupeds in the desert".

=== Verse 8 ===
Write it before them on a tablet,
and note it on a scroll

== Judgment on Assyria ==
=== Verse 33 ===
New King James Version:

For Tophet was established of old
Yes, for the king it is prepared. (Isaiah 30:33).

This verse begins For a hearth is ordered of old in the JPS 1917 edition of the Masoretic Text. The Contemporary English Version translates as:

Long ago the LORD got a place ready for burning the body of the dead king.

The king concerned is Sennacherib, king of Assyria from 705 BCE to 681 BCE, whose death is related in Isaiah 37:38.

== Bibliography ==
- Würthwein, Ernst (1995). The Text of the Old Testament. Translated by Rhodes, Erroll F. Grand Rapids, MI: Wm. B. Eerdmans. ISBN 0-8028-0788-7.
