= Isaiah 29 =

Book of Isaiah, chapter 29

- ← chapter 28 chapter 30 →
- The Great Isaiah Scroll, the best preserved of the biblical scrolls found at Qumran from the second century BC, contains all the verses in this chapter.
- Book: Book of Isaiah
- Hebrew Bible part: Nevi'im
- Order in the Hebrew part: 5
- Category: Latter Prophets
- Christian Bible part: Old Testament
- Order in the Christian part: 23

Isaiah 29 is the twenty-ninth chapter of the Book of Isaiah in the Hebrew Bible or the Old Testament of the Christian Bible. This book contains the prophecies attributed to the prophet Isaiah, and is one of the Book of the Prophets. The Jerusalem Bible groups chapters 28-35 together as a collection of "poems on Israel and Judah".

== Text ==
The original text was written in Hebrew language. This chapter is divided into 24 verses.

=== Textual witnesses ===
Some early manuscripts containing the text of this chapter in Hebrew are of the Masoretic Text tradition, which includes the Codex Cairensis (895), the Petersburg Codex of the Prophets (916), Aleppo Codex (10th century), Codex Leningradensis (1008).

Fragments containing parts of this chapter were found among the Dead Sea Scrolls (3rd century BC or later):

- 1QIsa^{a}: complete
- 1QIsa^{b}: extant: verses 1‑8
- 4QIsa^{f} (4Q60): extant: verses 1‑8
- 4QIsa^{k} (4Q64): extant: verses 1‑9

There is also a translation into Koine Greek known as the Septuagint, made in the last few centuries BCE. Extant ancient manuscripts of the Septuagint version include Codex Vaticanus (B; $\mathfrak{G}$^{B}; 4th century), Codex Sinaiticus (S; BHK: $\mathfrak{G}$^{S}; 4th century), Codex Alexandrinus (A; $\mathfrak{G}$^{A}; 5th century) and Codex Marchalianus (Q; $\mathfrak{G}$^{Q}; 6th century).

== Parashot ==
The parashah sections listed here are based on the Aleppo Codex. Isaiah 29 is a part of the Prophecies about Judah and Israel (Isaiah 24–35). {P}: open parashah; {S}: closed parashah.

{P} 29:1-8 {P} 29:9-12 {S} 29:13-14 {S} 29:15-21 {P} 29:22-24 {S}

== A problem solved, a problem started (29:1–14) ==
This part contains two oracles which can be 'paired with complete ease'.

The Lord acting in judgment	Reducing the city to dust (1–4)	Inducing coma in those who have chosen blindness (9–12)
The Lord acting in transformation	Dispersing the foe in an eleventh-hour rescue (5–8)	Performing a supernatural act of changing hearts and imparting new wisdom (13-14)

=== Verse 1 ===
"Woe to Ariel, to Ariel, the city where David dwelt!

Add year to year;
Let feasts come around".

- "Ariel": that is"Jerusalem", lit. "Lion of God".

The name given to Jerusalem in verses 1-7 is "Ariel": God will bring distress upon Ariel, and will make her like "an ariel". The Encyclopedia Judaica suggests that the word is derived from a root, ari, meaning "to burn", similar to the Arabic word ʿiratun, meaning "hearth", such that Isaiah expects that Jerusalem will "become like the altar, i.e., a scene of holocaust" (compare verse 6).

"Dwelt": Robert Lowth's nineteenth century version, Brenton's Septuagint Translation, and the New English Translation all render "dwelt" (ḥā·nāh) as "besieged", recalling the events of 2 Samuel 5:6–7 when David and his men captured the stronghold of Zion from the Jebusites.

=== Verse 6 ===
You will be visited by the Lord of hosts

with thunder and with earthquake and great noise,
with whirlwind and tempest, and the flame of a devouring fire.

- "Visited" (KJV, ESV): is rendered as "punished" in NKJV and MEV.

=== Verse 10 ===
For the Lord has poured out on you the spirit of deep sleep

and has closed your eyes, the prophets;
and He has covered your heads, the seers.

The word tar·dê·māh, translated as "deep sleep", reflects the deep sleep which the Lord God caused to fall on Adam in Genesis 2:21.

=== Verses 13–14 ===
^{13}Therefore the Lord said:

"Inasmuch as these people draw near with their mouths

And honor Me with their lips,

But have removed their hearts far from Me,

And their fear toward Me is taught by the commandment of men

^{14}Therefore, behold, I will again do a marvelous work
Among this people,

A marvelous work and a wonder;

For the wisdom of their wise men shall perish,

And the understanding of their prudent men shall be hidden."

Jesus Christ quoted verse 13 as noted in Matthew 15:7–9 and Mark 7:6–7.

== Spiritual transformation (29:15–24) ==
The poem in this section can be divided into three parts (just as the theme of the opening three 'woes') offering 'a meditation on the theme of transformation'.

1. The first transformation: the subverting of reason (verses 15–16)
2. The second transformation: coming world renewal (verses 17–21)
3. The third transformation: the changed fortune of Jacob (verses 22–24)

=== Verse 22 ===
Therefore thus says the Lord, who redeemed Abraham, concerning the house of Jacob:

Jacob shall not now be ashamed,

nor shall his face now turn pale;

The Cambridge Bible for Schools and Colleges argues that "[this] clause is suspicious, both from its position in the original, and from its contents. There is no incident in the biblical history of Abraham to which the expression "redeem" is specially appropriate; there is, however, a late Jewish legend about his being delivered from a fiery death prepared for him by his heathen relations (Book of Jubilees, chapter 12). The words may be a late interpolation."

== See also ==
- Abraham
- Ariel (angel)
- Jacob
- Jerusalem
- Lebanon
- Related Bible parts: Matthew 15, Mark 7, Revelation 2

== Sources ==
- Motyer, J. Alec (2015). The Prophecy of Isaiah: An Introduction & Commentary. InterVarsity Press. ISBN 9780830895243.
- Würthwein, Ernst (1995). The Text of the Old Testament. Translated by Rhodes, Erroll F. Grand Rapids, MI: Wm. B. Eerdmans. ISBN 0-8028-0788-7.
