= Isaiah 28 =

Book of Isaiah, chapter 28

- ← chapter 27 chapter 29 →
- The Great Isaiah Scroll, the best preserved of the biblical scrolls found at Qumran from the second century BC, contains all the verses in this chapter.
- Book: Book of Isaiah
- Hebrew Bible part: Nevi'im
- Order in the Hebrew part: 5
- Category: Latter Prophets
- Christian Bible part: Old Testament
- Order in the Christian part: 23

Isaiah 28 is the twenty-eighth chapter of the Book of Isaiah in the Hebrew Bible or the Old Testament of the Christian Bible. This book contains the prophecies attributed to the prophet Isaiah and is one of the Books of the Prophets. The Jerusalem Bible groups chapters 28-35 together as a collection of "poems on Israel and Judah".

== Text ==
The original text was written in Hebrew language. This chapter is divided into 29 verses.

=== Textual witnesses ===
Some early manuscripts containing the text of this chapter in Hebrew are of the Masoretic Text tradition, which includes the Codex Cairensis (895), the Petersburg Codex of the Prophets (916), Aleppo Codex (10th century), Codex Leningradensis (1008).

Fragments containing parts of this chapter were found among the Dead Sea Scrolls (3rd century BC or later):

- 1QIsa^{a}: complete
- 1QIsa^{b}: extant: verses 15‑19, 28‑29
- 4QIsa^{f} (4Q60): extant: verses 6‑9, 16‑18, 22, 28‑29
- 4QIsa^{k} (4Q64): extant: verses 26‑29

There is also a translation into Koine Greek known as the Septuagint, made in the last few centuries BCE. Extant ancient manuscripts of the Septuagint version include Codex Vaticanus (B; $\mathfrak{G}$^{B}; 4th century), Codex Sinaiticus (S; BHK: $\mathfrak{G}$^{S}; 4th century), Codex Alexandrinus (A; $\mathfrak{G}$^{A}; 5th century) and Codex Marchalianus (Q; $\mathfrak{G}$^{Q}; 6th century).

== Parashot ==
The parashah sections listed here are based on the Aleppo Codex. Isaiah 28 is a part of the Prophecies about Judah and Israel (Isaiah 24–35). {P}: open parashah; {S}: closed parashah.

{P} 28:1-4 {S} 28:5-6 {S} 28:7-8 {P} 28:9-13 {P} 28:14-15 {P} 28:16-17 {S} 28:18-22 {P} 28:23-29 {P}

== Captivity of Ephraim (28:1–13) ==
=== Verse 1 ===
Woe to the crown of pride, to the drunkards of Ephraim, whose glorious beauty is a fading flower, which are on the head of the fat valleys of them that are overcome with wine!

- "Crown": refers to Samaria, the capital city of the northern kingdom of Israel ("Ephraim"), where the priests and prophets are included among the drunkards (cf. verse 7).

== A cornerstone in Zion (28:14–22) ==
=== Verse 16 ===
Therefore thus saith the Lord God,

Behold, I lay in Zion for a foundation a stone,

a tried stone, a precious corner stone, a sure foundation:
he that believeth shall not make haste.

Cited in Romans 9:33, Ephesians 2:20, 1 Peter 2:6,8

== Parable of the farmer (28:23–29) ==
Verses 23–29 constitute a parable or mashal drawn from the "wisdom of the countryman". He first of all claims the attention of his audience as a teacher of wisdom, next shares his illustration from the approach of the farmer, then "leaves his hearers to interpret and apply the parable themselves".

== See also ==
- Cornerstone
- Ephraim
- Jerusalem
- Sheol
- Zion
- Related Bible parts: Isaiah 8, Luke 20, Romans 9, Ephesians 2, 1 Peter 2

== Bibliography ==
- Würthwein, Ernst (1995). The Text of the Old Testament. Translated by Rhodes, Erroll F. Grand Rapids, MI: Wm. B. Eerdmans. ISBN 0-8028-0788-7.
