= The Dream Isaiah Saw =

Contemporary classical choral Christmas song

- American hymn by Glenn L. Rudolph
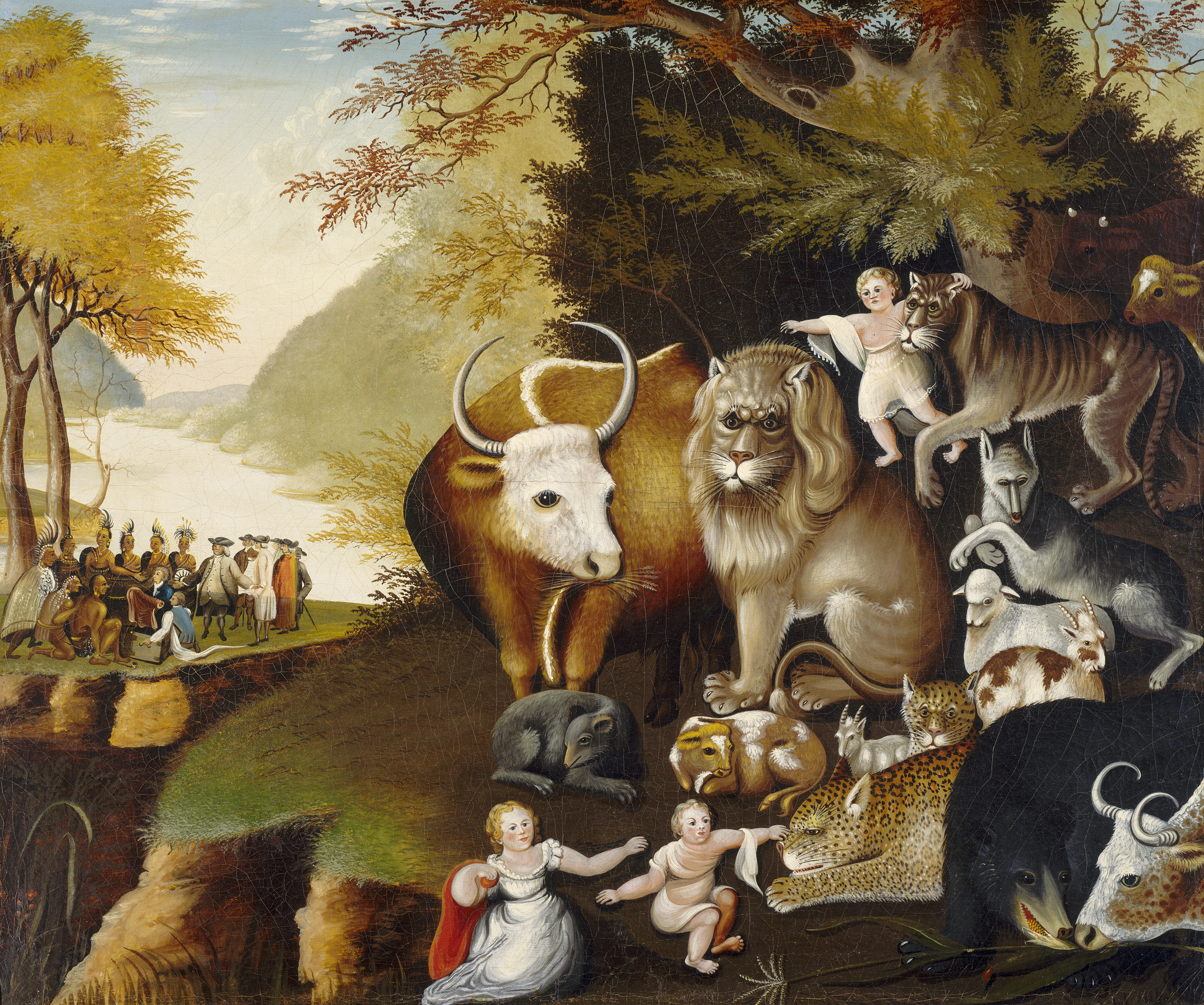
- Peaceable Kingdom (Edward Hicks, circa 1834)
- Genre: Christmas song
- Occasion: Sermons on peace and Advent
- Written: 1994
- Text: by Thomas H. Troeger
- Language: English
- Based on: Isaiah 11:6–9
- Meter: 10-10-10-10-7-7-7-7
- Composed: 30 September 2001
- Published: Oxford University Press, 2004
- In memory of those who perished on September 11, 2001

"The Dream Isaiah Saw" is a contemporary classical choral Christmas song, commissioned by the Bach Choir of Pittsburgh and composed in 2001 by Glenn L. Rudolph to the lyrics of Thomas H. Troeger's 1994 hymn "Lions and Oxen Will Feed in the Hay." It has become a holiday favorite. The hymn has become a signature piece of The Washington Chorus and is performed annually at the John F. Kennedy Center for the Performance Arts. The song has been independently released by many symphonic and college choirs. It is regularly performed by symphonic, college, church, and school choirs during Advent.

== History ==
In preparation for their 2001 Christmas concert In Dulci Jubilo, the Bach Choir of Pittsburgh (led by Brady R. Allred) commissioned five new holiday compositions. Glenn L. Rudolph, an active performer, conductor and composer in the Pittsburgh area since 1978, composed "The Dream Isaiah Saw." Rudolph was working on the piece when the attacks of September 11, 2001 took place. The Dream Isaiah Saw was finished nineteen days after 9/11 attacks and became a dedication to those who lost their lives in that tragedy. Rudolph said that the events of the 9/11 had an impact on the music he wrote for the hymn.

The Bach Choir of Pittsburgh and The Pittsburgh Symphony Brass first performed the song at Westminster Presbyterian Church in Upper St.Clair, Pennsylvania on Sunday, December 16, 2001.

== Lyrics ==
The lyrics of a hymn Lions and Oxen Will Feed in the Hay first appeared in the book by Thomas H. Troeger Borrowed Light: Hymn Texts, Prayers, and Poems published by Oxford University Press in 1994. Thomas Troeger drew inspiration from the Book of Isaiah 11:6-9, an Old Testament book in the Bible by a Latter Prophet Isaiah.

== Critical reception ==
"The Dream Isaiah Saw" has become a popular song in many choir performances at Christmas in the United States and Australia. Christopher Bell, the artistic director and conductor of the Washington Chorus, reported that the experience of Washington Chorus Candlelight Christmas "blew [him] away," mentioning "the candles, the procession, and 'The Dream Isaiah Saw.'" It is praised as a modern song that stacks up well against the classics. Critics have described it as intense, gripping, thrilling, haunting, cathartically climactic, packed with the biggest emotional punch, able to "bring audiences spontaneously to their feet," "bringing tears to the eyes."

The following choirs have recorded the song:

- The Bach Choir of Pittsburgh and The Pittsburgh Symphony Brass (original performers). (2010). Cantate Hodie: Sing Forth This Day!
- The Georgia Boy Choir. (2014) Georgia Boy Choir YouTube Channel.
- Hickory Choral Society. (2013). Christmas Concert 2013. Celebrating 35 Years of Music.
- The Indianapolis Symphonic Choir. (2014). Festival of Carols.
- Messiah College Concert Choir. (2012). In Remembrance.
- Millikin University Choir. (2015). Vespers 201: Sweet Music in the Night.
- Oklahoma City University. (2017). Christmas Vespers.
- The Washington Chorus. (2009). Christmas with the Washington Chorus.

In 2018 the Aspen Choral Society included "The Dream Isaiah Saw" in their 41st holiday performance of Handel's Messiah.

== Bibliography ==
- Rudolph, Glenn L. (2004) The Dream Isaiah Saw. Vocal Score. Oxford: Oxford University Press.

== See also ==
- Book of Isaiah
