= Millar Burrows =

American biblical scholar (1899–1980)

Millar Burrows (Wyoming, Ohio, October 26, 1889 – April 29, 1980) was an American biblical scholar, a leading authority on the Dead Sea Scrolls and professor emeritus at Yale Divinity School. Burrows was director of American School of Oriental Research in Jerusalem (now the William F. Albright School of Archaeological Research), and later president of the American Schools of Oriental Research. His grandson, Edwin G. Burrows (1943–2018), was an American historian and winner of the Pulitzer Prize (1999).

== Early life and education ==
Burrows was born on October 26, 1889, in Wyoming, Ohio. He was one of three sons born to Edwin Jones, a businessman, and Katharine Douglas (Millar) Burrows. He studied at Cornell University, graduating in 1912. He then attended the Union Theological Seminary, New York, to train for ordination, and he graduated with a Bachelor of Divinity (BD) degree in 1915.

While working as a minister, Burrows also undertook part-time graduate studies. He studied for his doctorate at Yale University under Charles Cutler Torrey, and he graduated in 1925. His dissertation was titled "The Literary Relations of Ezekiel".

== Career ==
=== Ordained ministry ===
In 1915, Burrows was ordained as a minister of the Presbyterian Church. Then, from 1915 to 1919, he ministered at a rural church in Texas. For the next year he supervised a survey for the Texas Interchurch World Movement. From 1920 to 1923, he was a pastor and taught the Bible at Tusculum College in Tennessee.

=== Academic career ===
Burrows was internationally known for his prompt editing of the Dead Sea manuscripts of Cave One, and was able to communicate the results of research in language understandable to the public. Burrows gave working names to several of the scrolls, such as the "Manual of Discipline" to 1QS. Burrows worked on the Isaiah Scroll, pointing out its consistency with the Masoretic Text.

Burrows also wrote on the Hebrew Bible and New Testament. On the Bible he once noted that it is concerned with three subjects: religion, agriculture, and war.

== Works ==
- Founders of Great Religions. Charles Scribner's Sons, 1931
- An Outline of Biblical Theology. Westminster Press, 1946.
- Palestine is Our Business. Westminster Press, 1949.
- The Dead Sea Scrolls. Viking Press, 1955. Reprint: Gramercy Publishing, 1986. ISBN 0-517-62535-0.
- More Light on the Dead Sea Scrolls. Viking Press, 1958.
- Jesus in the First Three Gospels. Abingdon Press, 1977.

Burrows also served on the Advisory Board for Peake's Commentary on the Bible (1962), to which he contributed an article on "The Social Institutions of Israel."
