= Athanasius Yeshue Samuel =

1st Metropolitan of Syriac Orthodox Church of Antioch in the United States

Metropolitan Mor Athanasius Yeshue Samuel (Arabic: صموئيل، أثناسيوس يشوع; 1909–1995), more often referred to as Mor Samuel, was the first archbishop of the Syriac Orthodox Church in the United States and Canada. He formerly served as the archbishop of Jerusalem of the Syriac Orthodox Church, where he played a central role in the discovery of the Dead Sea Scrolls.

In 1947, while Metropolitan of Jerusalem of the Syriac Orthodox Church of Antioch, Mor Samuel received news that some ancient texts had been discovered. Samuel arranged to see the scrolls. After examining them, and suspecting that they were indeed very old, Mor Samuel expressed an interest in purchasing them. All four scrolls that had been then discovered would find their way into his possession, including the now famous Isaiah Scroll, the Community Rule, the Habakkuk Peshar, and the Genesis Apocryphon. The scrolls were sold to Mor Samuel by Kando, an antiquities dealer.

Following the end of the British mandate over Palestine and Transjordan and the outbreak of hostilities between Arabs and Jews, Mor Samuel relocated to the United States in 1949, and played a major role in the life of the Syriac Orthodox Church in North America. From 1952, he served as Patriarchal Vicar to the United States and Canada, and from 1957, as Archbishop of the newly created Archdiocese of the United States and Canada.

== Bibliography ==
- Wilson, Edmund, The Dead Sea Scrolls, 1947–1969, New York: Oxford University Press, 1969.
- Vanderkam, James and Flint, Peter, The Meaning of the Dead Sea Scrolls, Continuum International Publishing Group, 2005.
