= Revelation 18 =

- ← chapter 17 chapter 19 →
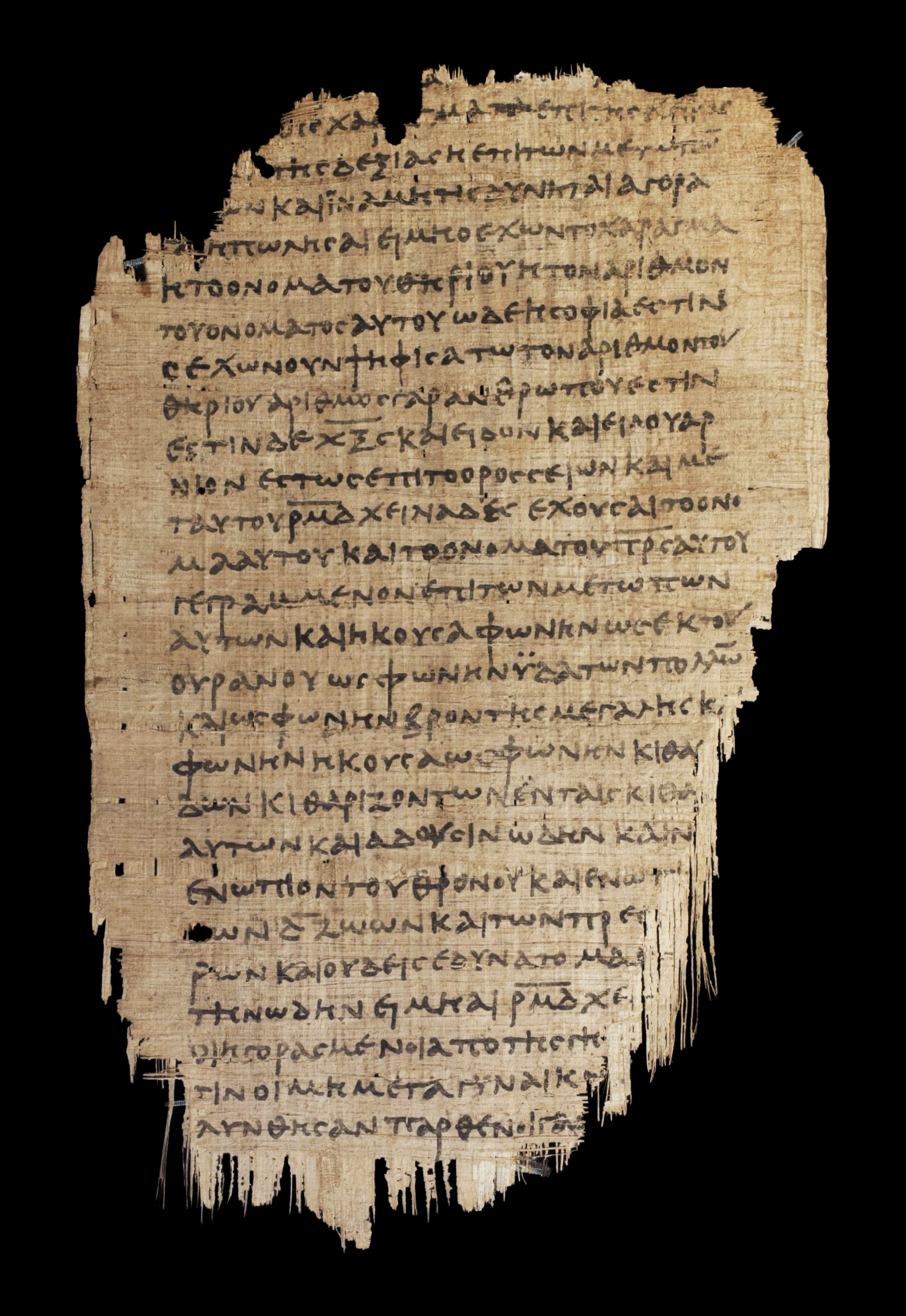
- Revelation 13:16-14:4 on Papyrus 47 from the third century.
- Book: Book of Revelation
- Category: Apocalypse
- Christian Bible part: New Testament
- Order in the Christian part: 27

Revelation 18 is the eighteenth chapter of the Book of Revelation or the Apocalypse of John in the New Testament of the Christian Bible. The book is traditionally attributed to John the Apostle, but the precise identity of the author remains a point of academic debate. This chapter describes the fall of Babylon the Great.

== Text ==
The original text was written in Koine Greek. This chapter is divided into 24 verses.

=== Textual witnesses ===
Some early manuscripts containing the text of this chapter are among others: (Note: The Book of Revelation is missing from Codex Vaticanus.)

- Codex Sinaiticus (330–360)
- Codex Alexandrinus (400–440)
- Codex Ephraemi Rescriptus (ca. 450; extant verses 3-24)

=== Old Testament references ===
- Revelation 18:7: Isaiah 47:8

=== New Testament concordances ===
- Revelation 18:2: Revelation 14:8

== The fall of Babylon: the voice of an angel (18:1–3) ==
The cry of the angel about judgement against Babylon is an expansion of the one in Revelation 14:8.

=== Verse 1 ===
After these things I saw another angel coming down from heaven, having great authority, and the earth was illuminated with his glory.

"Another angel": one of several angels distinguished from each other within the Book of Revelation (cf. Revelation 10:1; 19:6, 15, 17; Revelation 15:1, etc.). Ezekiel 43:2, "the Earth shone with the glory of the God of Israel" is here translated rather more literally than in the Septuagint.

=== Verse 2 ===
And he cried mightily with a strong voice saying Babylon the great is fallen is fallen and is become the habitation of devils and the hold of every foul spirit and a cage of every unclean and hateful bird

Cross reference: Isaiah 21:9, Revelation 14:8

- "Devils": is translated from Ancient Greek: δαιμονίων, daimoniōn, "demons", compare to Mark 1:34, Luke 11:24, also Isaiah 13:20-22; Isaiah 34:13-15.
- "Hold" and "cage": are translated from the same Greek word φυλακὴ, phylakē, "a strong place", which is more like "prison" (not a "fortress") as also rendered in 1 Peter 3:19.

== The fall of Babylon: the voice from heaven (18:4–20) ==
The part records the words spoken by the voice from heaven referred in verse 4.

New Testament scholar James Tabor believes that this passage is a reference to the eruption of Mount Vesuvius that destroyed Pompeii, and possibly even based on eyewitness accounts of the event. Similar to Pompeii, a city is destroyed by fire in one hour, with ships in port only able to watch in horror. In context, it threatens a similar event to Babylon (potentially really referring to Rome) that happened to Pompeii.

=== Verse 8 ===
Therefore her plagues will come in one day—death and mourning and famine. And she will be utterly burned with fire, for strong is the Lord God who judges her.

- "In one day": denoting "a sudden and overwhelming reverse", such as "at the last judgment day" (cf. Matthew 24:37–42).

=== Verses 11-16 ===
11 And the merchants of the earth shall weep and mourn over her; for no man buyeth their merchandise any more:

12 The merchandise of gold, and silver, and precious stones, and of pearls, and fine linen, and purple, and silk, and scarlet, and all thyine wood, and all manner vessels of ivory, and all manner vessels of most precious wood, and of brass, and iron, and marble,

13 And cinnamon, and odours, and ointments, and frankincense, and wine, and oil, and fine flour, and wheat, and beasts, and sheep, and horses, and chariots, and slaves, and souls of men.

14 And the fruits that thy soul lusted after are departed from thee, and all things which were dainty and goodly are departed from thee, and thou shalt find them no more at all.

15 The merchants of these things, which were made rich by her, shall stand afar off for the fear of her torment, weeping and wailing,

16 And saying, Alas, alas that great city, that was clothed in fine linen, and purple, and scarlet, and decked with gold, and precious stones, and pearls!

- This "lament of the merchants" is possibly based on a lament for the merchants of Tyre in Ezekiel 27:1–36.

=== Verse 17 ===
For in one hour so great riches is come to nought. And every shipmaster, and all the company in ships, and sailors, and as many as trade by sea, stood afar off,

=== Verse 18 ===
And cried when they saw the smoke of her burning, saying, What city is like unto this great city!

=== Verse 19 ===
They threw dust on their heads and cried out, weeping and wailing, and saying, ‘Alas, alas, that great city, in which all who had ships on the sea became rich by her wealth! For in one hour she is made desolate.’

- "They threw dust on their heads": like "the seafaring men on account of Tyre" (Ezekiel 27:30) the people make a gesture normally used in mourning or 'in afflicted and distressed circumstances, denoting disorder, confusion, and debasement' (cf. Joshua 7:6; Job 2:12).
- "Alas, alas! that great city": compared to Revelation 18:10, 16), mourning a city once so great now in flames.

=== Verse 20 ===
Rejoice over her, thou heaven, and ye holy apostles and prophets; for God hath avenged you on her.

== The fall of Babylon: the voice of another angel (18:21–24) ==
The symbolic prophecy of the fall of Babylon is here modeled as in the Book of Jeremiah (51:63–64).

== See also ==
- Related Bible chapters: Jeremiah 51, Zechariah 12, Revelation 4, Revelation 6, Revelation 13, Revelation 14, Revelation 15, Revelation 16, Revelation 17

== Sources ==
- Bauckham, Richard (2007). "81. Revelation". In Barton, John; Muddiman, John (eds.). The Oxford Bible Commentary (first (paperback) ed.). Oxford University Press. pp. 1287–1306. ISBN 978-0199277186.
