= Voice in the Wilderness =

Voice in the Wilderness or "a lone voice in the wilderness" is an English idiom for someone who expresses an idea or opinion that is not popular or that the individual is the sole person expressing that particular opinion with the suggestion that the opinion is then ignored.

It is from the King James Bible, Matthew 3:3, Mark 1:3, Luke 3:4 John 1:23 "... voice of one crying in the wilderness ..." and Isaiah 40:3 "The voice of him that crieth in the wilderness ...".

Voice in the Wilderness may refer to:

== Film ==
- The Voice in the Wilderness (Armenian: Ձայն բարբառոյ..., romanized: Dzayn barbaro...), a 1991 Armenian drama film

== Literature ==
- A Voice in the Wilderness, an 1897 book by Algernon Sidney Crapsey
- "A Voice in the Wilderness", a 1904 story by E. W. Hornung, featured in the 1905 novel Stingaree
- A Voice in the Wilderness, a 1915 novel by Grace Livingston Hill
- The Voice in the Wilderness, a 1933 gospel by Alice Seymour
- Johnny Appleseed: A Voice in the Wilderness, The Story of the Pioneer John Chapman, a 1953 book by Leslie Marshall and Harlan Hatcher
- Voice in the Wilderness: Collected Essays of Fifty Years, a 1974 book by Corliss Lamont
- Voices in the Wilderness, a 1977 non-fiction book by John Bowden
- A Voice Crying in the Wilderness: Notes from a Secret Journal, a 1989 book by Edward Abbey
- Voice in the Wilderness: Imre Nagy and the Hungarian Revolution, a 1991 non-fiction book by Peter Unwin
- A Voice in the Wilderness, a 1991 autobiography by Phil Drabble
- A Voice in the Wilderness: Conversations with Terry Tempest Williams, a 2005 non-fiction book edited by Michael Austin
- A Voice in the Wilderness, a 2022 book by Joseph L. Graves Jr.

== Television ==
- "A Voice in the Wilderness", Babylon 5 season 1, episodes 18–19 (1994)
- "A Voice in the Wilderness", Sport Billy episode 8 (1980)
- "Voice in the Wilderness", Hudson's Bay episode 3 (1959)
- "Voice in the Wilderness", The Flying House episode 4 (1982)

== Music ==
- "The Voice in the Wilderness", a 1916 sacred song by John Prindle Scott
- "A Voice in the Wilderness" (song), a song by Cliff Richard from the 1959 film Expresso Bongo
- Voices in the Wilderness, a 2003 studio album by John Zorn

== Other uses ==
- Voices in the Wilderness (organization)

=== "Vox clamantis in deserto" ===
The Latin of the Vulgate Version, "Vox clamantis in deserto" may refer to:

- Vox Clamantis, a 14th-century poem by John Gower about the Peasants' Rising
- The motto of Dartmouth College
- Offertory ex D "Vox clamantis in deserto” (18th century), by Václav Jan Kopřiva
- Ego sum vox clamantis in deserto, a sermon written in 1510 by Pedro de Córdoba

== See also ==
- Cassandra
- Voice of Wilderness, a 2005 studio album by Korpiklaani
