= William Craig Brownlee =

William Craig Brownlee (1784 – February 10, 1860) was an American clergyman, professor of languages and author. He was born in Lanarkshire, Scotland and was the fourth son of the Laird of Torfoot. President William McKinley was a distant cousin.

Brownlee founded the Philoclean Society at Rutgers in 1825. Basking Ridge, NJ named a street, Brownlee Place, in his honor.

== Career ==
Brownlee studied at the University of Glasgow, receiving a master's degree with honors. He was licensed as a minister by the Church of Scotland in 1808, before coming to the United States.

Brownlee held several Associate Presbyterian pastorates in Pennsylvania and New Jersey and was master of a classical academy in Basking Ridge, NJ. He received an honorary degree from Princeton Theological Seminary in 1820, then the University of Glasgow gave him an honorary Doctor of Divinity in 1824 for his critical work on the Quakers. Brownlee's parishioners described him as an independent thinker and engaging speaker who often criticized the Roman Catholic Church, Universalism and other groups.

He became professor of Latin and Greek at Rutgers College in 1825. The next year, Brownlee was installed as a minister at the Collegiate Reformed Dutch church in New York City. He served on a rotating basis among several Dutch Reformed Churches in Manhattan until 1860.

In 1836, he helped found a group called The American Society to Promote the Principles of the Protestant Reformation. It was an anti-Catholic society, which was eventually absorbed into the American and Foreign Christian Union. It exists today as an ecumenical, mainline Protestant organization.

Brownlee's career was cut short by a paralyzing stroke in 1843, from which he never fully recovered, even though his mind remained clear. He and his wife had nine children.

== Works ==
Brownlee wrote the 1833 novel The Whigs of Scotland, a two-volume historical romance about The Killing Time. In the book's introduction, he argued that the Scottish resistance lit the fires of liberty against "the gigantic efforts of a civil and religious fanaticism" from England. Walter Scott, whose portrayal of the Covenanters Brownlee called an injustice, was the epic's inspiration.

Brownlee also edited the Dutch Church Magazine (four volumes), founded The Protestant Vindicator newspaper in 1834, and published several books, including:

- Inquiry into the Principles of the Quakers (1824)
- The Whigs of Scotland: or, the Last of the Stuarts. An Historical Romance of the Scottish Persecution (1833)
- Letters in the Roman Catholic Controversy (1834)
- The Christian Youth's Book (1844)
- Treatise on Popery (1847)
- Lights and Shadows of Christian Life (1847)
- Narrative of the Battles of Drumclog and Bothwell Bridge (1850)
- Saint Patrick and the Western Apostolic Churches (1857)
- Secret instructions of the Jesuits (1857)
- Popery: An enemy to civil and religious liberty, and dangerous to our republic (1836)

Among his articles in the Dutch Church Magazine are eight articles in support of the authenticity of the Johannine Comma (1 John 5. 7–8): 1, 2, 3, 4, 5, 6, 7, 8.
