= Peter Flint =

American scholar of the Dead Sea Scrolls

Peter William Flint was an American biblical scholar who was involved in research of the Dead Sea Scrolls for over 20 years.

== Education ==
In 1972 Flint completed his first B.A. from Witwatersrand, Johannesburg, South Africa. In 1973 he obtained his Teacher's Higher Diploma, from Johannesburg College of Education in South Africa. From the University of South Africa in Pretoria he earned a B.A. (Honors) in Classical Hebrew in 1979 and a M.A.(Dissertation: Terminology for 'Sin' in the Hebrew and Greek Scriptures) in 1983. Seven years later, in 1990 he completed his second M.A at the University of Notre Dame in Indiana, followed by a Ph.D. in Old Testament and Second Temple Judaism in 1993.

== Career ==
He was one of the 70 official members of the Dead Sea Scrolls editors worldwide. As the controversy of publishing of the Dead Sea Scrolls escalated, in 1987 he moved from South Africa to the University of Notre Dame in Indiana, where he took a doctoral fellowship and began to study under Eugene Ulrich, the chief editor of the biblical Dead Sea Scrolls and one of the central figures of the controversy.

In 1997, Flint finished publishing the Great Psalms Scroll: the second largest portion of the biblical Dead Sea Scrolls. This publication is full of discoveries providing insights for Bible translations, Bible study and biblical scholarship. Flint was an editor of the largest intact scroll: The Great Isaiah Scroll. He served at Trinity Western University as a professor of Religious Studies, the Canada Research Chair in Dead Sea Scrolls Studies, and a director of the Dead Sea Scrolls Institute.

Peter Flint edited several texts for the Discoveries in the Judaean Desert Series, including work on the Great Isaiah Scroll from Cave 1. His book The Meaning of the Dead Sea Scrolls, received an award from the Biblical Archaeology Society.

He died on November 3, 2016.

== Selection of published works ==
- The Dead Sea Psalms Scrolls and the Book of Psalms (E.J.Brill, 1997).
- Editor of The Dead Sea Scrolls After Fifty Years: A Comprehensive Assessment (E.J. Brill, 1998–99).
- Co-author of The Dead Sea Scrolls Bible (Harper San Francisco, 2002).
- The Dead Sea Scrolls (Nashville: Abingdon Press, 2013).
- The Meaning of the Dead Sea Scrolls: Their Significance For Understanding the Bible, Judaism, Jesus and Christianity. (HarperCollins Publishers, 2002). *This book received an award from the Biblical Archaeology Society.
