= Westminster Press =

Westminster Press may refer to:

- Westminster Press (London) was a printing company in London run by Gerard Meynell, printer of The Imprint
- Westminster Press (Philadelphia), merged with John Knox Press to form Westminster John Knox Press; published science fiction and other material aimed at younger readers from at least 1954 to 1980.
- Westminster Press (Pearson subsidiary), a defunct regional newspaper company in the United Kingdom owned by Pearson
