= Isaiah 24 =

Book of Isaiah, chapter 24

- ← chapter 23 chapter 25 →
- The Great Isaiah Scroll, the best preserved of the biblical scrolls found at Qumran from the second century BC, contains all the verses in this chapter.
- Book: Book of Isaiah
- Hebrew Bible part: Nevi'im
- Order in the Hebrew part: 5
- Category: Latter Prophets
- Christian Bible part: Old Testament
- Order in the Christian part: 23

Isaiah 24 is the 24th chapter of the Book of Isaiah in the Hebrew Bible or the Old Testament of the Christian Bible. This book contains the prophecies attributed to the prophet Isaiah, and is one of the Books of the Prophets. Chapters 24-27 of Isaiah constitute one unit of prophecy sometimes called the "Isaiah Apocalypse". Chapter 24 contains the prophecy on the destruction of Judah for its defilements and transgressions (Isaiah 24:1–12), while a remnant will praise God (Isaiah 24:13–15), and God, by his judgments on his people and their enemies, will advance his kingdom (Isaiah 24:16–23).

== Text ==
The original text was written in Hebrew language. This chapter is divided into 23 verses.

=== Textual witnesses ===
Some early manuscripts containing the text of this chapter in Hebrew are of the Masoretic Text tradition, which includes the Codex Cairensis (895), the Petersburg Codex of the Prophets (916), Aleppo Codex (10th century), Codex Leningradensis (1008).

Fragments containing parts of this chapter were found among the Dead Sea Scrolls (3rd century BC or later):

- 1QIsa^{a}: complete
- 1QIsa^{b}: extant: verses 18‑23
- 4QIsa^{b} (4Q56): extant: verses 2
- 4QIsa^{c} (4Q57): extant: verses 1‑15, 19‑23
- 4QIsa^{f} (4Q60): extant: verses 1‑3

There is also a translation into Koine Greek known as the Septuagint, made in the last few centuries BCE. Extant ancient manuscripts of the Septuagint version include Codex Vaticanus (B; $\mathfrak{G}$^{B}; 4th century), Codex Sinaiticus (S; BHK: $\mathfrak{G}$^{S}; 4th century), Codex Alexandrinus (A; $\mathfrak{G}$^{A}; 5th century) and Codex Marchalianus (Q; $\mathfrak{G}$^{Q}; 6th century).

== Parashot ==
The parashah sections listed here are based on the Aleppo Codex. Isaiah 24 is a part of the Prophecies about Judah and Israel (Isaiah 24–35). {P}: open parashah; {S}: closed parashah.

{P} 24:1-15 {S} 24:16-20 {S} 24:21-23 {P}

== Verse 1 ==
Behold, the Lord maketh the earth empty, and maketh it waste,

and turneth it upside down, and scattereth abroad the inhabitants thereof.

- "Empty" (Hebrew: בוקק bō-qêq; also written בקק): in the sense of "poured out from a vessel". The Arabic parallel has an onomatopoetic sound of water flowing, emptied out from a bottle or "gurgling noise" from that action.
- "Waste" (Hebrew: בולק bō-lêq; also written בלק; Assyrian: balâ‡u): "laid waste" or "devastated". The Arabic parallel means to "void" also a form of onomatopoeia, to "void" or "drain away" a bottle of its content; similar to the word that means "empty".

== See also ==
- Jerusalem
- Mount Zion
- Related Bible parts: Isaiah 1, Isaiah 5, Isaiah 9, Isaiah 10, Isaiah 29, Isaiah 30, Zechariah 5, Matthew 24, 1 Thessalonians 5, 2 Thessalonians 2, Revelation 6, Revelation 8, Revelation 15, Revelation 18, Revelation 19

== Bibliography ==
- Ulrich, Eugene, ed. (2010). The Biblical Qumran Scrolls: Transcriptions and Textual Variants. Brill.
- Würthwein, Ernst (1995). The Text of the Old Testament. Translated by Rhodes, Erroll F. Grand Rapids, MI: Wm. B. Eerdmans. ISBN 0-8028-0788-7.
