= Book of Isaiah =

Book of the Bible

The Book of Isaiah (Hebrew: ספר ישעיהו [ˈseː.fɛr jə.ʃaʕ.ˈjɔː.huː]) is the first of the Latter Prophets in the Hebrew Bible and the first of the major prophets in the Christian Old Testament. It is identified by a superscription as the words of the prophet Isaiah, who is dated to the 8th century BCE, but there is evidence that much of it was composed during the Babylonian captivity and later.

Johann Christoph Döderlein suggested in 1775 that the book contained the works of two prophets separated by more than a century, and Bernhard Duhm originated the view, held as a consensus through most of the 20th century, that the book comprises three separate collections of oracles: Proto-Isaiah (chapters 1–39), containing the words of the prophet Isaiah, dated to the 8th century BCE; Deutero-Isaiah, or "the Book of Consolation", (chapters 40–55), the work of an anonymous author writing during the Exile in the 6th century BCE; and Trito-Isaiah (chapters 56–66), composed after the return from Exile. Isaiah 1–33 promises judgment and restoration for Judah, Jerusalem and the nations, and chapters 34–66 presume that judgment has been pronounced and restoration follows soon. While few scholars today attribute the entire book, or even most of it, to one person, the book's essential unity has become a focus in more recent research.

The book can be read as an extended meditation on the destiny of Jerusalem into and after the Exile. The Deutero-Isaian part of the book describes how God will make Jerusalem the centre of his worldwide rule through a royal saviour (a messiah) who will destroy the oppressor ("Babylon", the Neo-Babylonian Empire); this messiah is the king Cyrus the Great of Persia, who founded the Achaemenid Empire, who is merely the agent who brings about Yahweh's kingship. Christians interpret passages of Isaiah as messianic prophecies of Jesus.

Isaiah speaks out against corrupt leaders and for the disadvantaged, and roots righteousness in God's holiness rather than in Israel's covenant.

Isaiah was one of the most popular works among Jews in the Second Temple period (c. 515 BCE – 70 CE). In Christian circles, it was held in such high regard as to be called "the Fifth Gospel", and its influence extends beyond Christianity to English literature and to Western culture in general, from the libretto of Handel's Messiah to a host of such everyday phrases as "swords into ploughshares", "shelter from the storm" and "voice in the wilderness".

== Structure ==
General scholarly consensus through most of the 20th century saw three separate collections of oracles in the book of Isaiah. A typical outline based on this understanding of the book sees its underlying structure in terms of the identification of historical figures who might have been their authors:

- 1–39: Proto-Isaiah, containing the words of the original Isaiah;
- 40–55: Deutero-Isaiah, the work of an anonymous Exilic author;
- 56–66: Trito-Isaiah, an anthology of about twelve passages.

While one part of the general consensus still holds, this perception of Isaiah as made up of three rather distinct sections underwent a radical challenge in the last quarter of the 20th century. The newer approach looks at the book in terms of its literary and formal characteristics, rather than authors, and sees in it a two-part structure divided between chapters 33 and 34:

- 1–33: Warnings of judgment and promises of subsequent restoration for Jerusalem, Judah and the nations;
- 34–66: Judgment has already taken place and restoration is at hand.

However, the old consensus still as of 2023 enjoys wide support from critical Bible scholars, including Marko Marina.

== Summary ==
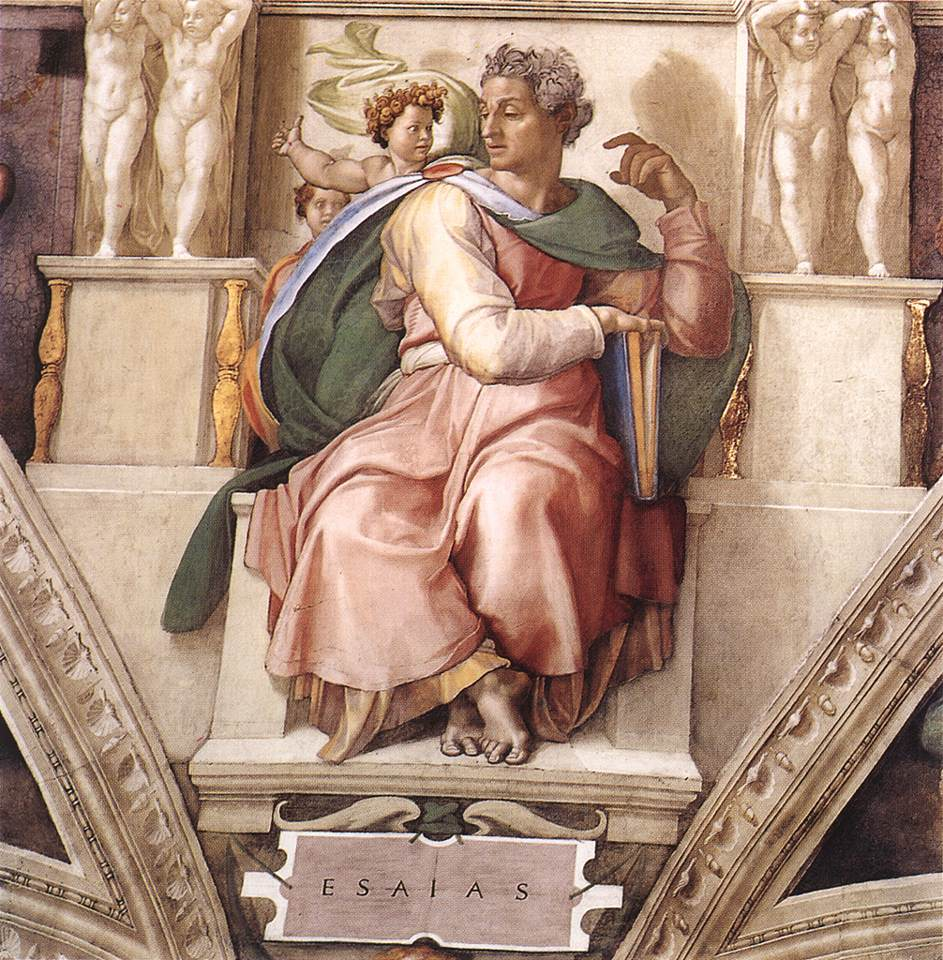
Michelangelo (c. 1508–12), Isaiah, Vatican City: Sistine Chapel ceiling

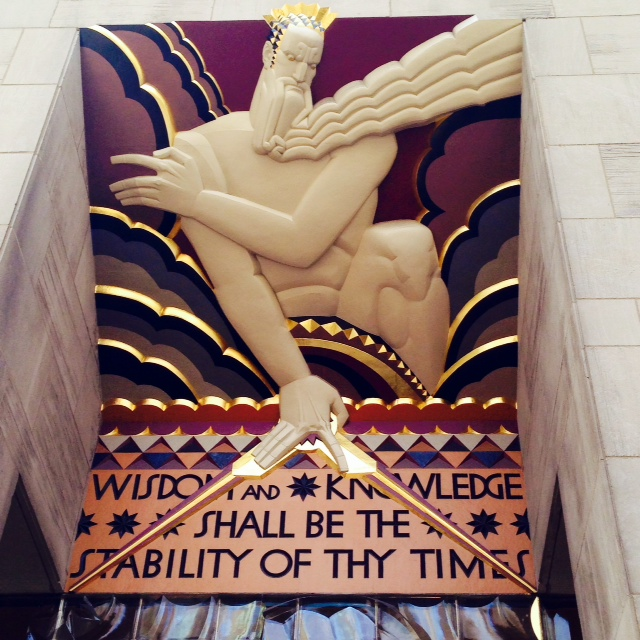
Detail of entrance to 30 Rockefeller Plaza showing verse from Isaiah 33:6 Rockefeller Center, New York

Seeing Isaiah as a two-part book (chapters 1–33 and 34–66) with an overarching theme leads to a summary of its contents like the following:

- The book opens by setting out the themes of judgment and subsequent restoration for the righteous. God has a plan which will be realised on the "Day of Yahweh", when Jerusalem will become the centre of his worldwide rule. On that day the world will come to Zion (Jerusalem) for instruction, but first the city must be punished and cleansed of evil. Israel is invited to join in this plan. Chapters 5–12 explain the significance of the Assyrian judgment against Israel: righteous rule by the Davidic king will follow after the arrogant Assyrian monarch is brought down. Chapters 13–27 announce the preparation of the nations for Yahweh's world rule; chapters 28–33 announce that a royal saviour (the messiah) will emerge in the aftermath of Jerusalem's punishment and the destruction of her oppressor.
- The oppressor (now identified as Babylon rather than Assyria) is about to fall. Chapters 34–35 tell how Yahweh will return the redeemed exiles to Jerusalem. Chapters 36–39 tell of the faithfulness of king Hezekiah to Yahweh during the Assyrian siege as a model for the restored community. Chapters 40–54 state that the restoration of Zion is taking place because Yahweh, the creator of the universe, has designated the Persian king Cyrus the Great as the promised messiah and temple-builder. Specifically, Chapter 53 predicts a suffering servant who will be the messiah the prophet speaks of in previous verses. Chapters 55–66 are an exhortation to Israel to keep the covenant. God's eternal promise to David is now made to the people of Israel/Judah at large. The book ends by enjoining righteousness as the final stages of God's plan come to pass, including the pilgrimage of the nations to Zion and the realisation of Yahweh's kingship.

The older understanding of this book as three fairly discrete sections attributable to identifiable authors leads to a more atomised picture of its contents, as in this example:

- Proto-Isaiah/First Isaiah (chapters 1–39):
  - 1–12: Oracles against Judah mostly from Isaiah's early years;
  - 13–23: Oracles against foreign nations from his middle years;
  - 24–27: The "Isaiah Apocalypse", added at a much later date;
  - 28–33: Oracles from Isaiah's later ministry
  - 34–35: A vision of Zion, perhaps a later addition;
  - 36–39: Stories of Isaiah's life, some from the Book of Kings
- Deutero-Isaiah/Second Isaiah (chapters 40–55), with two major divisions, 40–48 and 49–55, the first emphasizing Israel, the second Zion and Jerusalem:
  - An introduction and conclusion stressing the power of God's word over everything;
  - A second introduction and conclusion within these in which a herald announces salvation to Jerusalem;
  - Fragments of hymns dividing various sections;
  - The role of foreign nations, the fall of Babylon, and the rise of Cyrus as God's chosen one;
  - Four "servant songs" personalising the message of the prophet;
  - Several longer poems on topics such as God's power and invitations to Israel to trust in him;
- Trito-Isaiah/Third Isaiah (chapters 56–66):
  - A collection of oracles by unknown prophets in the years immediately after the return from Babylon.

== Composition ==
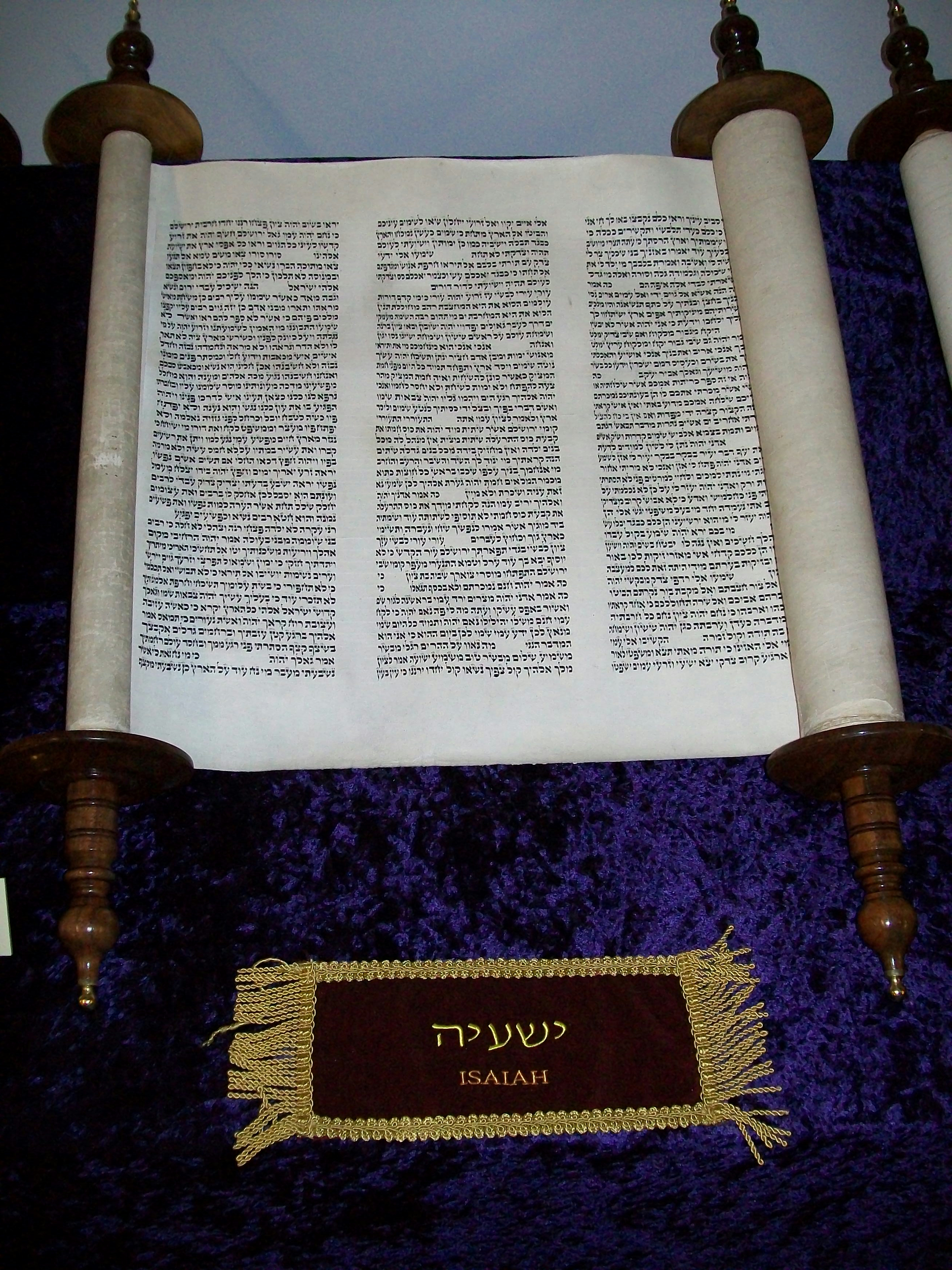
Scroll of Book of Isaiah

=== Authorship ===
While it is widely accepted that the book of Isaiah is rooted in a historic prophet called Isaiah, who lived in the Kingdom of Judah during the 8th century BCE, it is also widely accepted that this prophet did not write the entire book of Isaiah.

- Historical situation: Chapters 40–55 presuppose that Jerusalem has already been destroyed (they are not framed as prophecy) and the Babylonian exile is already in effect – they speak from a present in which the Exile is about to end. Chapters 56–66 assume an even later situation, in which the people are already returned to Jerusalem and the rebuilding of the Temple is already under way.
- Anonymity: Isaiah's name suddenly stops being used after chapter 39.
- Style: There is a sudden change in style and theology after chapter 40; numerous key words and phrases found in one section are not found in the other.

The composition history of Isaiah reflects a major difference in the way authorship was regarded in ancient Israel and in modern societies; the ancients did not regard it as inappropriate to supplement an existing work while remaining anonymous. While the authors are anonymous, it is plausible that all of them were priests, and the book may thus reflect Priestly concerns, in opposition to the increasingly successful reform movement of the Deuteronomists.

According to British priest and scholar John Barton, only chapters 1-8 and 28-31 are the real sayings of Isaiah, and that scribes would add, "...whole blocks of sayings that are in origin anonymous."

=== Historical context ===
The Isaiah Scroll, the oldest surviving manuscript of Isaiah: found among the Dead Sea Scrolls and dating from about 150 to 100 BCE, it contains almost the whole Book of Isaiah and is substantially identical with the modern Masoretic Text

The historic Isaiah ben Amoz lived in the Kingdom of Judah during the reigns of four kings from the mid to late 8th-century BCE. During this period, the Neo-Assyrian Empire was expanding westward from its origins in Upper Mesopotamia towards the Mediterranean, destroying first Aram-Damascus in 734–732 BCE, then the Kingdom of Israel in 722–721 (the "Assyrian captivity"), and finally subjugating Judah in 701.

Proto-Isaiah is divided between verse and prose passages, and a currently popular theory is that the verse passages represent the prophecies of the original 8th-century Isaiah, while the prose sections are "sermons" on his texts composed at the court of Josiah a hundred years later, at the end of the 7th century.

The conquest of Jerusalem by the Neo-Babylonian Empire and the exile of its elite in 586 BCE, the "Babylonian captivity", ushered in the next stage in the formation of the book. Deutero-Isaiah addresses himself to the Jews in exile, offering them the hope of return. This was the period of the meteoric rise of Persis under Cyrus the Great; in 559 BCE, he succeeded his father as ruler of a small vassal kingdom in what is now eastern Iran, and by 540 he ruled the Achaemenid Empire, which stretched from the Mediterranean to Central Asia, and in 539, he conquered Babylon, ending the Neo-Babylonian Empire. Deutero-Isaiah's predictions of the imminent fall of Babylon and his glorification of Cyrus as the deliverer of Israel date his prophecies to 550–539 BCE, and probably towards the end of this period.

The Persians ended the Jewish exile, and by 515 BCE, the exiles, or at least some of them, had returned to Jerusalem and rebuilt the Temple. The return, however, was not without problems: the returnees found themselves in conflict with those who had remained in the country and who now owned the land, and there were further conflicts over the form of government that should be set up. This background forms the context of Trito-Isaiah.

== Themes ==
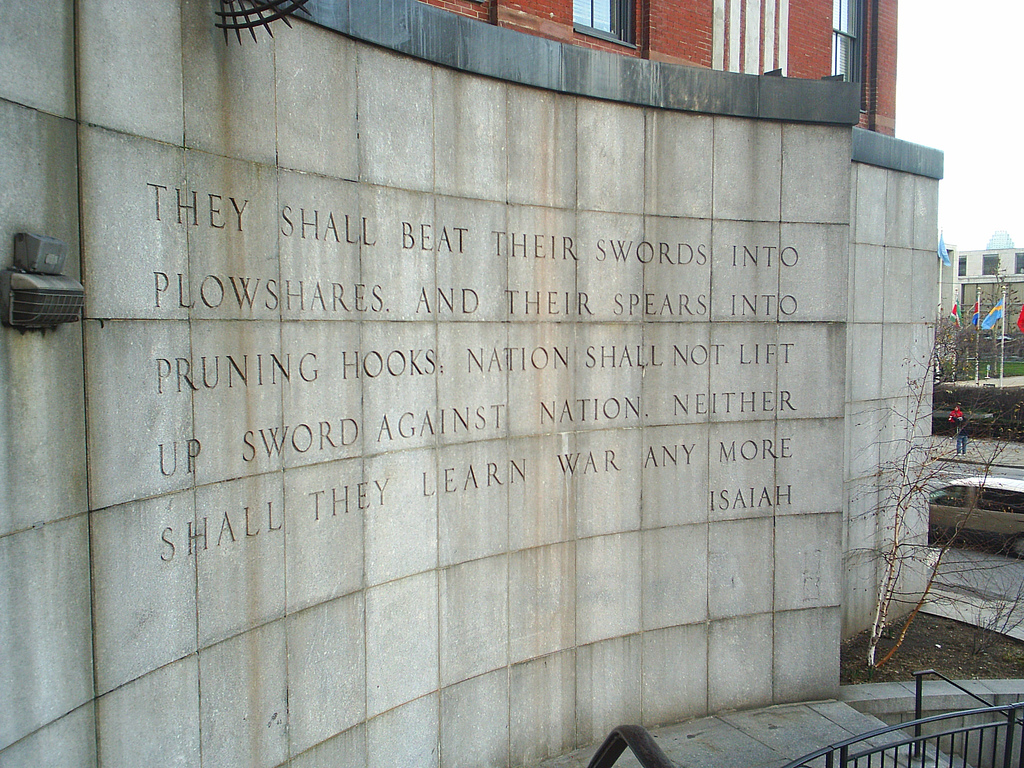
Isaiah 2:4 is taken as an unofficial mission statement by the United Nations. (Isaiah Wall in Ralph Bunche Park, a New York City park near UN headquarters.)

=== Overview ===
The Book of Isaiah focuses on the main role of Jerusalem in God's plan for the world, seeing centuries of history as though they were all the single vision of the 8th-century prophet Isaiah.

- Proto-Isaiah speaks of Israel's desertion of God and what will follow: Israel will be destroyed by foreign enemies, but after the people, the country and Jerusalem are punished and purified, a remnant of Israel will live in God's place in Zion, governed by God's chosen king, under the presence and protection of God.
- Deutero-Isaiah has as its subject the liberation of Israel from captivity in Babylon in another Exodus, which the God of Israel will arrange using Cyrus, the Persian conqueror, as his agent.
- Trito-Isaiah concerns Jerusalem, the Temple, the Sabbath, and Israel's salvation. (More explicitly, it concerns questions current among Jews living in Jerusalem and Judea in the post-Exilic period about who is a God-loving Jew and who is not).

Walter Brueggemann has described this overarching narrative as "a continued meditation upon the destiny of Jerusalem".

=== Holiness, righteousness, and God's plan ===
God's plan for the world is based on his choice of Jerusalem as the place where he will manifest himself, and of the line of David as his earthly representative – a theme that may possibly have originated with Jerusalem's reprieve from Assyrian attack in 701 BCE. God is "the holy one of Israel"; justice and righteousness are the qualities that mark the essence of God, and Israel has offended God through unrighteousness. Isaiah speaks out for the poor and the oppressed and against corrupt princes and judges, but unlike the prophets Amos and Micah he roots righteousness not in Israel's covenant with God but in God's holiness.

The idea of Israel as a "light unto the nations" is introduced in Isaiah 42. In context, this phrase was meant to give hope and comfort to the Jews of the Babylonian exile. However, the ethical implications of this phrase have taken on greater meaning in later religious and political thought.

=== Monotheism ===
Isaiah 44:6 contains the first clear statement of Yahwist monotheism: "I am the first and I am the last; beside me there is no God". In Isaiah 44:9–20, this develops into a satire on the making and worship of idols, mocking the foolishness of the carpenter who worships the idol that he himself has carved. While Yahweh had shown his superiority to other gods before, in Second Isaiah he becomes the sole God of the world. This model of monotheism became the defining characteristic of post-Exilic Judaism and provided the basis for Christianity and for Islam.

=== A new Exodus ===
A central theme in Second Isaiah is that of a new Exodus – the return of the exiled people Israel from Babylon to Jerusalem. The author imagines a ritualistic return to Zion (Judah), led by Yahweh. The importance of this theme is indicated by its placement at the beginning and end of Second Isaiah (40:3–5, 55:12–13). This new Exodus is repeatedly linked with Israel's Exodus from Egypt to Canaan under divine guidance, but with new elements. These links include the following:

- The original Exodus participants left "in great haste" (Ex 12:11, Deut 16:3), whereas the participants in this new Exodus will "not go out in great haste" (Isa 52:12).
- The land between Egypt and Canaan of the first Exodus was a "great and terrible wilderness, an arid wasteland" (Deut 8:15), but in this new Exodus, the land between Babylon (Mesopotamia) and the Promised Land will be transformed into a paradise, where the mountains will be lowered and the valleys raised to create level road (Isa 40:4).
- In the first Exodus, God provided water, but sparingly. In the new Exodus, God will "make the wilderness a pool of water, and the dry land springs of water" (Isa 41:18).

== Later interpretation and influence ==
=== 2nd Temple Judaism (515 BCE – 70 CE) ===
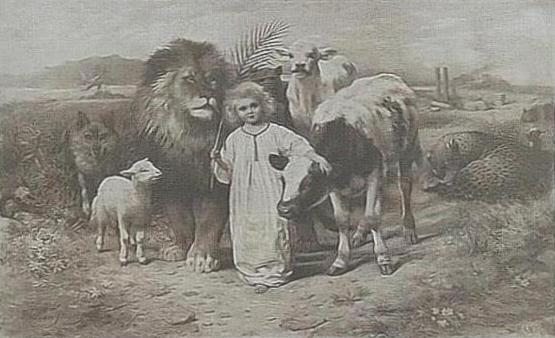
Peace, 1896 etching by William Strutt, based upon Isaiah 11:6–7

Isaiah was one of the most popular works in the period between the foundation of the Second Temple c. 515 BCE and its destruction by the Romans in 70 CE. Isaiah's "shoot [which] will come up from the stump of Jesse" is alluded to or cited in the Psalms of Solomon and various apocalyptic works including the Similitudes of Enoch, 2 Baruch, 4 Ezra, and the third of the Sibylline Oracles, all of which understood Isaiah as referring to a messiah and a Messianic Age. Isaiah 6, in which Isaiah describes his vision of the Lord enthroned in the Temple, influenced the Book of Enoch, the Book of Daniel, the Book of Ezekiel.

In the four "servant songs" from Isaiah 42, 49, 50 and 52, the Lord calls upon his "servant" to lead the nations. The servant is horribly abused, sacrifices himself by accepting the punishment due others, and is finally rewarded. Some Second Temple texts, including the Book of Wisdom and the Book of Daniel, identified the "servant" as a group of "the wise" who "will lead many to righteousness" (Daniel 12:3). Other texts interpret the servant in messianic terms.

=== Christianity ===
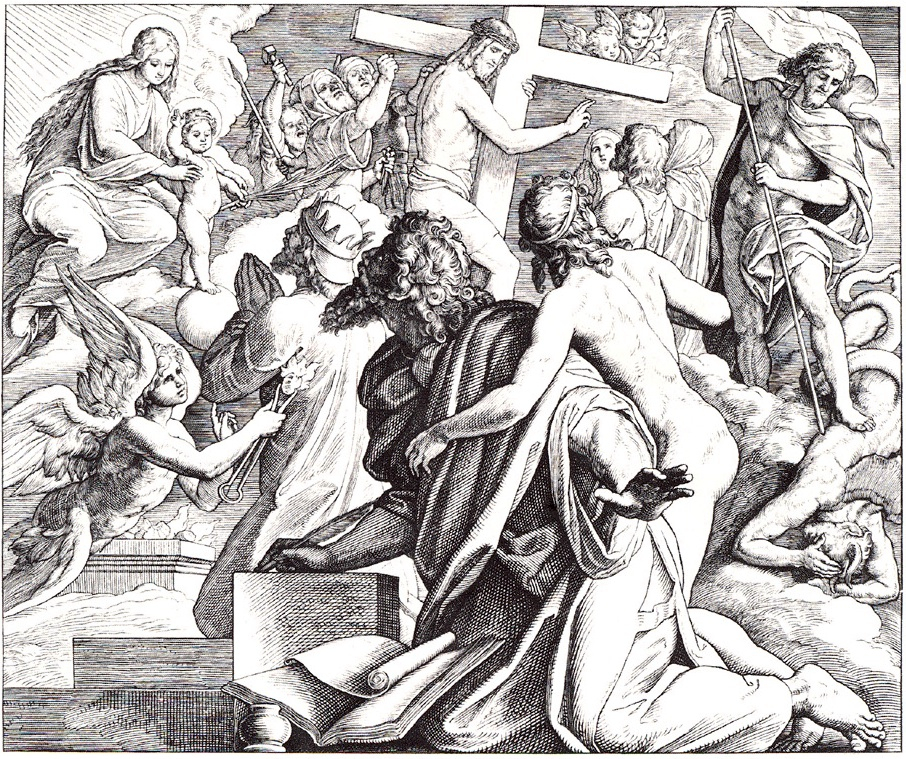
The Vision of Isaiah is depicted in this 1860 woodcut by Julius Schnorr von Karolsfeld.

Of the books of the Hebrew Bible, Isaiah has a singular role in the formation and evolution of Christianity. The earliest Christians, building on the messianic interpretation of Enoch, interpreted the fourth servant songs (Isaiah 52:13–53:12) as a prophecy of the death and exaltation of Jesus. According to Luke 4:17–21, Jesus understood the prophecy to be about himself. The Book of Isaiah has inspired Marian devotions, anti-Jewish polemic, medieval passion iconography, and in modern times, Christian feminism and liberation theology. Isaiah was frequently called a "Fifth Gospel" of Jesus's greatest prophet.

Isaiah provides 27 of the 37 quotations from the prophets in the Pauline epistles, and is mentioned numerous times in the Gospels and in Acts of the Apostles. Isaiah 7:14—in which Isaiah assures Ahaz that the Lord will save Judah from invasion—is the basis for Matthew 1:23's doctrine of the virgin birth of Jesus. Isaiah 40:3–5's image of the Babylonian Exiles' return is repurposed in all four Gospels, applied to John the Baptist and Jesus. The Book of Revelation draws heavily from Isaiah for its language and imagery.

Verses and phrases from Isaiah have entered into the Western cultural imagination; Isaiah's words appear in such works as the libretto of Handel's Messiah and in expressions like "swords into ploughshares" and "voice in the wilderness".

== See also ==
- Beulah (land)
- "Dream Isaiah Saw"
- "I Have a Dream"
- Rorate Coeli

== Bibliography ==
- Bandstra, Barry L. (2008). Reading the Old Testament: an introduction to the Hebrew Bible. Cengage Learning. ISBN 978-0495391050.
- Barker, Margaret (2003). "Isaiah". In Dunn, James D. G.; Rogerson, John William (eds.). Eerdmans Commentary on the Bible. Eerdmans. ISBN 9780802837110.
- Becker, Uwe (2020). "The Book of Isaiah: Its Composition History". In Tiemeyer, Lena-Sofia (ed.). The Oxford Handbook of Isaiah. Oxford University Press. ISBN 978-0-19-066924-9.
- Blenkinsopp, Joseph (2002). Isaiah 40–55: A new translation with introduction and commentary. Doubleday. ISBN 0-385-49717-2.
- Blenkinsopp, Joseph (2003). Isaiah 56–66: A new translation with introduction and commentary. Doubleday. ISBN 0-385-50174-9.
- Boadt, Lawrence (1984). Reading the Old Testament:An Introduction. Paulist Press. ISBN 9780809126316.
- Brettler, Marc Zvi (2010). How to read the Bible. Jewish Publication Society. ISBN 978-0-8276-0775-0.
- Brueggemann, Walter (2003). An introduction to the Old Testament: the canon and Christian imagination. Westminster John Knox. ISBN 978-0-664-22412-7.
- Cate, Robert L. (1990a). "Isaiah". In Mills, Watson E.; Bullard, Roger Aubrey (eds.). Mercer Dictionary of the Bible. Mercer University Press. ISBN 9780865543737.
- Cate, Robert L. (1990b). "Isaiah, book of". In Mills, Watson E.; Bullard, Roger Aubrey (eds.). Mercer Dictionary of the Bible. Mercer University Press. ISBN 9780865543737.
- Childs, Brevard S. (2001). Isaiah. Westminster John Knox Press. ISBN 9780664221430.
- Clifford, Richard (1992). "Isaiah, Book of: Second Isaiah". In Freedman, David Noel (ed.). The Anchor Bible Dictionary. Vol. 3. Doubleday. p. 473. ISBN 0385193610.
- Cohn-Sherbok, Dan (1996). The Hebrew Bible. Cassell. ISBN 0-304-33702-1.
- Coogan, Michael D. (2009). A Brief Introduction to the Old Testament. Oxford University Press.
- Gnuse, Robert Karl (1997). No Other Gods: Emergent Monotheism in Israel. Continuum. ISBN 9781850756576.
- Goldingay, John (2001). Isaiah. Hendrickson Publishers. ISBN 0-85364-734-8.
- Goldingay, John (2005). The message of Isaiah 40–55: a literary-theological commentary. Continuum International Publishing Group. ISBN 9780567030382.
- Hannah, Darrell D. (2005). "Isaiah Within Judaism of the Second Temple Period". In Moyise, Steve; Menken, Maarten J.J. (eds.). Isaiah in the New Testament: The New Testament and the Scriptures of Israel. Continuum. ISBN 9780802837110.
- Lemche, Niels Peter (2008). The Old Testament between theology and history: a critical survey. Westminster John Knox Press. ISBN 9780664232450.
- Petersen, David L. (2002). The Prophetic Literature: An Introduction. Westminster John Knox Press. ISBN 9780664254537.
- Sawyer, John F.A. (1996). The Fifth Gospel: Isaiah in the History of Christianity. Cambridge University Press. ISBN 9780521565967.
- Soggin, J. Alberto (1989). Introduction to the Old Testament: From Its Origins to the Closing of the Alexandrian Canon. Westminster John Knox Press. ISBN 0-664-21331-6.
- Stromberg, Jake (2011). An Introduction to the Study of Isaiah. Continuum International Publishing Group. ISBN 9780567363305.
- Sweeney, Marvin A. (1996). Isaiah 1–39: With an Introduction to Prophetic Literature. Eerdmans. ISBN 9780802841001.
- Sweeney, Marvin A. (1998). "The Latter Prophets". In McKenzie, Steven L.; Graham, Matt Patrick (eds.). The Hebrew Bible Today: An Introduction to Critical Issues. Westminster John Knox Press. ISBN 9780664256524.
- Whybray, R. N. (2004). The Second Isaiah. T&T Clarke. ISBN 9780567084248.

Book of Isaiah Major prophets
Preceded by Kings	Hebrew Bible	Succeeded by Jeremiah
Preceded by Song of Songs	Protestant; Old Testament	Succeeded by Jeremiah
Preceded by Sirach	Roman Catholic & Eastern; Old Testament	Succeeded by Jeremiah
