= Isaiah Scroll =

One of the seven Dead Sea Scrolls

The Great Isaiah Scroll, the best preserved of the biblical scrolls found at Qumran

The Isaiah Scroll, designated 1QIsa^{a} and also known as the Great Isaiah Scroll, is one of the seven Dead Sea Scrolls that were first discovered by Bedouin shepherds in 1947 from Qumran Cave 1. The scroll is written in Hebrew and contains almost the entire Book of Isaiah from beginning to end, apart from a few small damaged portions. Dating from ca. 125 BCE, it is the oldest known complete copy of the Book of Isaiah, being approximately 1000 years older than the previous oldest Hebrew manuscripts known before the scrolls' discovery. 1QIsa^{a} is also notable in being the only scroll from the Qumran Caves to be preserved almost in its entirety.

The scroll is written on 17 sheets of parchment. It is particularly large, being about 734 cm (24 feet) long and ranges from 25.3 to 27 cm high (10 to 10.6 inches) with 54 columns of text.

== History to discovery ==
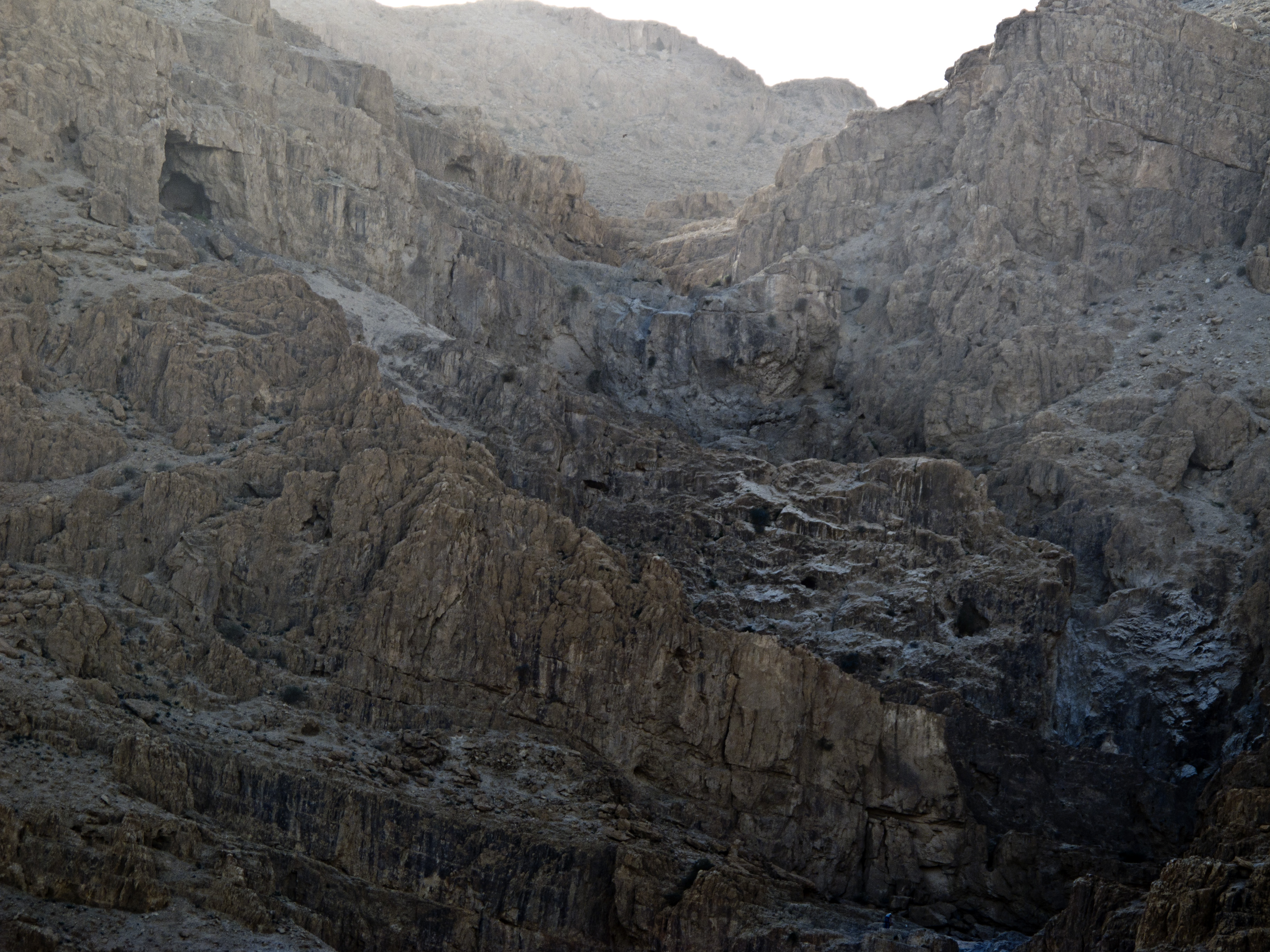
Qumran Cave 1, where 1QIsa^{a} was found.

The exact authors of 1QIsa^{a} are unknown, as is the exact date of writing. Pieces of the scroll have been dated using both radiocarbon dating, and palaeographic/scribal dating. These methods resulted in calibrated date ranges between 356 and 103 BC, and 150–100 BCE respectively. This seemingly fits with the theory that the scroll(s) was a product of the Essenes, a mystic Jewish sect, first mentioned by Pliny the Elder in his Natural History, and later by Josephus and Philo Judaeus. Further supporting this theory are the number of Essene sectarian texts found in the surrounding Qumran Caves, and the lining up of recorded beliefs to artifacts or structures at the Qumran site (like communal meals and the obsession with ritual purity lining up with rooms with hundreds of plates and many ritual baths found at the site). This theory is the most accepted in scholarly discourse. Further evidence that 1QIsa^{a} was used by the sectarian community at Qumran is that scholars Abegg, Flint, and Ulrich argue that the same scribe who copied the sectarian scroll Rule of the Community (1QS) also made a correction to 1QIsa^{a}. The reason for the placement of 1QIsa^{a} in Qumran Cave 1 is still unknown, though it has been speculated that it was placed, along with the other scrolls, by Jews (Essene or not) fleeing the Roman forces during the First Jewish–Roman War (c. 66–73 AD).

The scroll was discovered in Qumran Cave 1, by a group of three Ta'amireh shepherds, near the Ein Feshkha spring off the northwest shore of the Dead Sea between late 1946 and early 1947; initially discovered when one of the shepherds heard the sound of shattering pottery after throwing a rock while searching for a lost member of his flock. Once the shepherds agreed to return in a few days, the youngest one, Muhammed edh-Dhib returned alone before them, finding a cave filled with broken and whole jars and fragments of scrolls. Of the intact jars, edh-Dhib found all but two empty; one was filled with reddish earth, and the other with a parchment scroll (later found to be the Great Isaiah Scroll) and two oblong items covered in a black wax or pitch (later found to be the Habakkuk Commentary (1QpHab) and the Community Rule (1QS)). Edh-Dhib returned with the three scrolls to the displeasure of the other shepherds for his solo journey, and the scrolls were transferred to a Ta'amireh site southeast of Bethlehem where they were kept in a bag suspended on a tent pole for several weeks. During this time, the front cover of 1QIsa^{a} broke off. The three scrolls were brought to an antiques dealer in Bethlehem for appraisal.

== Publication ==
High quality scan of the scroll by the Israel Museum

The scroll first came into the possession of Khalil Iskander Shahin, better known as Kando, an antiques dealer who was a member of the Syrian Church. Kando was unable to make anything of the writing on the scroll, and sold it to Athanasius Yeshue Samuel (better known as Mar Samuel), the Syrian Archbishop of the Syrian Orthodox Church in East Jerusalem, who was anxious to have it authenticated. The Archbishop consulted many scholars in Jerusalem to determine the nature and significance of the documents, and in July 1947, he finally consulted the École Biblique and came in contact with the visiting Dutch scholar Professor J. van der Ploeg of Nijmegen University. Van der Ploeg identified one of the manuscripts at the monastery as a copy of the Book of Isaiah in Hebrew, but was met with skepticism, as a fellow scholar at the École Biblique believed that the scrolls must be fakes due to their antiquity.

In January 1948, Professor Eleazar Sukenik of the Chair of Palestinian Archaeology in the Hebrew University arranged to meet with a member of the Syrian community at the Jerusalem International YMCA to see the scrolls and borrow them for a few days, after hearing of their existence at the monastery. Upon realizing their authenticity, Sukenik copied several chapters of the Book of Isaiah from the manuscript and distributed copies to the Constituent Assembly of the State of Israel.

On 18 February 1948, Father Butrus Sowmy of St. Mark's Monastery called the American Schools of Oriental Research (ASOR) to contact William Brownlee, a Fellow at the ASOR, about publishing the Great Isaiah Scroll, the Habakkuk Commentary, and the Community Rule. Brownlee was away from the school temporarily, so Sowmy was put in contact with Dr. John Trever, photographer and temporary director of the school. Trever photographed the scrolls and sent the photographs to palaeographer and dean of American archaeologists, Professor William F. Albright of Johns Hopkins University, who dated the manuscript of Isaiah at around 100 BCE.

Early in 1949, Mar Samuel, Syrian Archbishop–Metropolitan of Jerusalem, brought the scroll to the United States, hoping to sell it and the three others he had in his possession. Samuel permitted ASOR to publish them within a limit of three years, and so Dr. Millar Burrows, director of ASOR, along with Dr. John Trever and Dr. William Brownlee prepared the scrolls for publication. The scrolls initially purchased by Samuel were published by the ASOR in 1950, and included 1QIsa^{a}, 1QpHab, and 1QS. The scrolls were advertised for sale in the Wall Street Journal in June 1954 under the "miscellaneous" columns, but were eventually purchased by Israeli archeologist Yigael Yadin for $250,000 in 1954 (equivalent to $3,000,000 in 2025) and brought back to Israel, although the purchase was not announced until February 1955. The scroll, along with over 200 fragments from the Dead Sea Scrolls, is now housed in Jerusalem at the Shrine of the Book at the Israel Museum. In September 2011, the Israel Museum, in a partnership with Google, completed the Dead Sea Scrolls Digital Project, which created 1200 megapixel images using a UV-protected flash and extremely short exposure times in order to limit damage to the scrolls. The project has digitized 1QIsa^{a}, the Great Isaiah Scroll, providing a high-quality image of the entire scroll. The digitized scroll provides an English translation alongside the original text, and can be viewed on the museum's website or through Google Arts & Culture.

== Scribal profile and textual variants ==
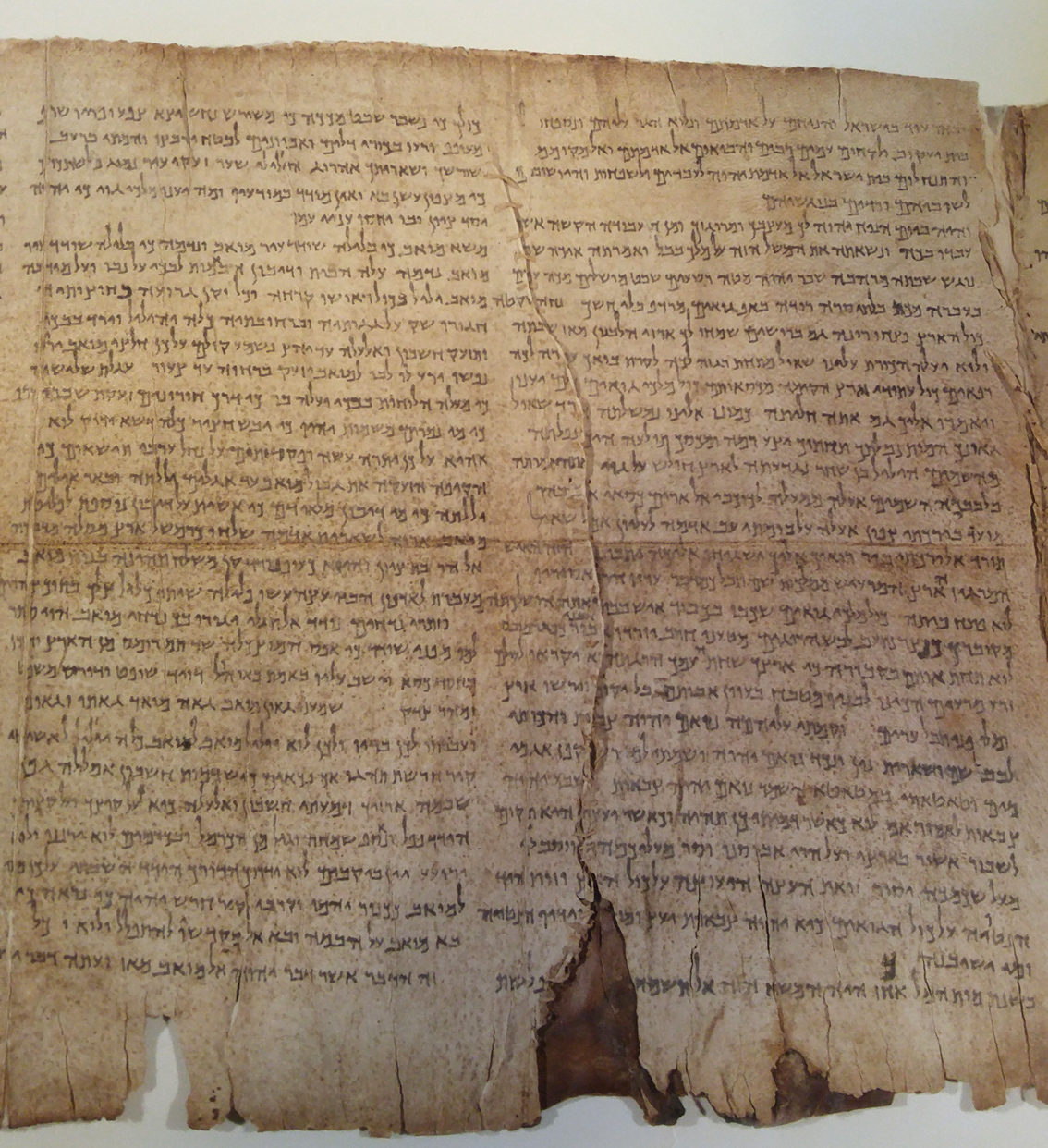
Photo of Great Isaiah Scroll facsimile showing columns 12–13 (chapters 14–16). Damage is shown at the bottom of the scroll, obscuring some of the text.

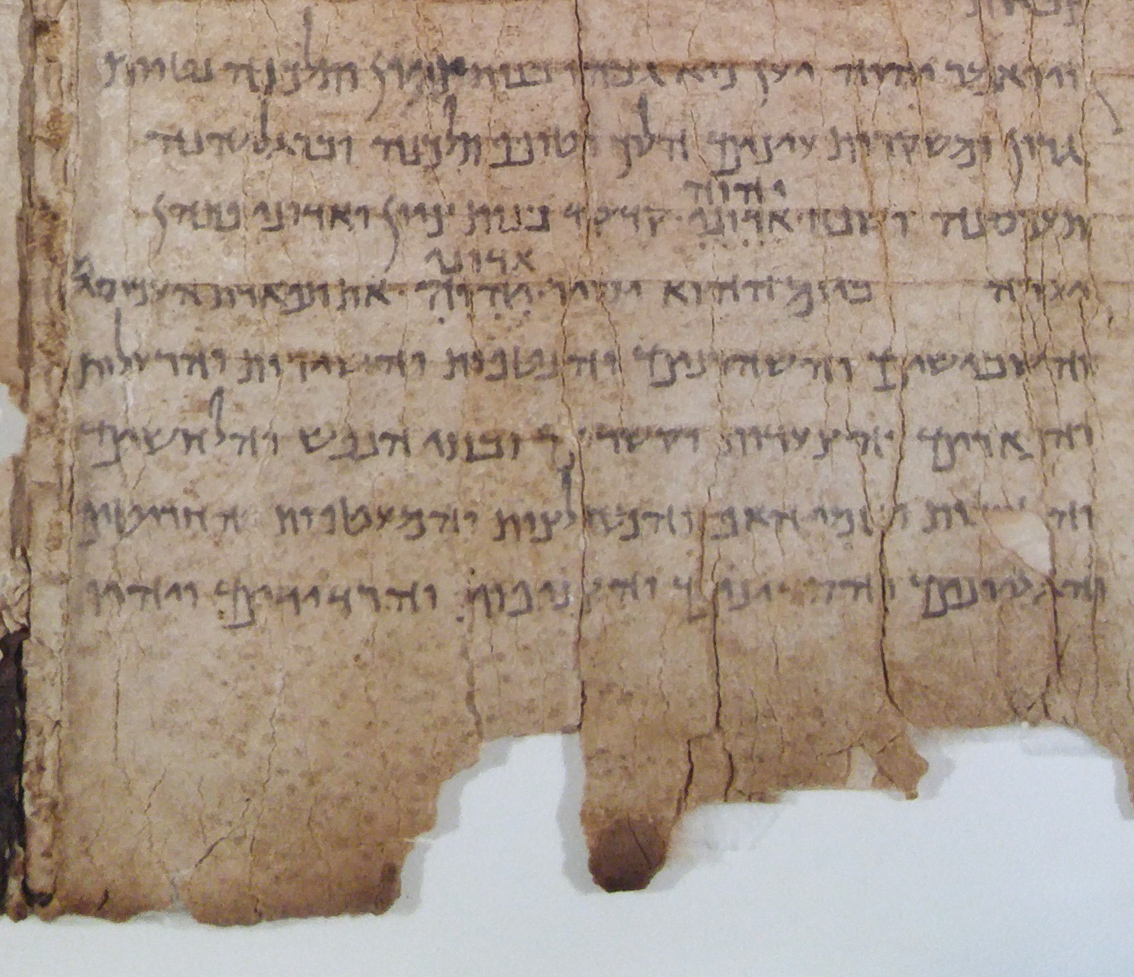
Great Isaiah Scroll facsimile photo showing an example of cancellation marks (dots) below the text and corrections made above it.

The text of the Great Isaiah Scroll is generally consistent with the Masoretic version and preserves all sixty-six chapters of the Hebrew version in the same sequence. There are small areas of damage where the leather has cracked off and a few words are missing. The text displays a scribal hand typical of the period of 125–100 BCE. The scroll also displays a tendency towards longer spellings of words which is consistent with this period. There is evidence of corrections and insertions by later scribes between the date of original writing and 68 CE. A unique feature of the scroll is that it is divided into two halves, each with 27 columns and 33 chapters, unlike later versions, suggesting that this may be the earliest dividing point for the Book of Isaiah. There is some debate among scholars over whether the entire original scroll was copied by a single scribe, or by two scribes mirroring each other's writing styles. A 2021 analysis by researchers at the University of Groningen applied artificial intelligence and pattern recognition tools to determine that it was highly likely that two scribes copied the scroll, each contributing one of the two halves.

The scroll contains scribal errors, corrections, and more than 2600 textual variants when compared with the Masoretic codex. This level of variation in 1QIsa^{a} is much greater than other Isaiah scrolls found at Qumran, with most, such as 1QIsa^{b}, being closer to the Masoretic Text. Some variants are significant and include differences in one or more verses or in several words. Most variants are more minor and include differences of a single word, alternative spellings, plural versus single usage, and changes in the order of words.

Some of the major variants are notable as they show the development of the book of Isaiah over time or represent scribal errors unique to 1QIsa^{a}. Abegg, Flint and Ulrich argue that the absence of the second half of verse 9 and all of verse 10 in chapter 2 of 1QIsa^{a} indicates that these are slightly later additions. These verses are found in other Qumran Isaiah scrolls, the Masoretic Text, and the Septuagint. In chapter 40, a shorter version of verse 7 is found, matching the Septuagint. In the same verse there is also an insertion by a later scribe showing a longer version that is consistent with the Masoretic Text. There are also several examples of likely scribal error in the scroll, such as Isaiah 16:8–9. Most of 16:8 is missing and the first part of verse 9 is missing when compared to the Masoretic Text and Septuagint, suggesting that the scribe's eye may have skipped over part of the text. Abegg, Peter Flint, and Ulrich note that there are a number of errors of this nature that may represent a degree of carelessness on the part of the scribe.

In some cases, the variants from 1QIsa^{a} have been incorporated in modern bible translations. An example is Isaiah 53:11 where 1QIsa^{a} and Septuagint versions match and clarify the meaning, while the Masoretic Text is somewhat obscure. Peter Flint notes that the readings from the Qumran scrolls such as Isaiah 53:11 have been adopted by the New International Version translation and Revised Standard Version translation.
