= 2 Kings 11 =

2 Kings, chapter 11

- ← chapter 10 chapter 12 →
- The pages containing the Books of Kings (1 & 2 Kings) Leningrad Codex (1008 CE).
- Book: Second Book of Kings
- Hebrew Bible part: Nevi'im
- Order in the Hebrew part: 4
- Category: Former Prophets
- Christian Bible part: Old Testament
- Order in the Christian part: 12

2 Kings 11 is the eleventh chapter of the second part of the Books of Kings in the Hebrew Bible or the Second Book of Kings in the Old Testament of the Christian Bible. The book is a compilation of various annals recording the acts of the kings of Israel and Judah by a Deuteronomic compiler in the seventh century BCE, with a supplement added in the sixth century BCE. This chapter records the reign of Athaliah and Joash as the rulers of Judah.

== Text ==
This chapter was originally written in the Hebrew language. It is divided into 21 verses in Christian Bibles, but into 20 verses in the Hebrew Bible as in the verse numbering comparison table below.

=== Verse numbering ===
Verse numbering for 2 Kings 11–12
English	Hebrew
11:21	12:1
12:1–21	12:2–22

This article generally follows the common numbering in Christian English Bible versions, with notes to the numbering in Hebrew Bible versions.

=== Textual witnesses ===
Some early manuscripts containing the text of this chapter in Hebrew are of the Masoretic Text tradition, which includes the Codex Cairensis (895), Aleppo Codex (10th century), and Codex Leningradensis (1008).

There is also a translation into Koine Greek known as the Septuagint, made in the last few centuries BCE. Extant ancient manuscripts of the Septuagint version include Codex Vaticanus (B; $\mathfrak{G}$^{B}; 4th century) and Codex Alexandrinus (A; $\mathfrak{G}$^{A}; 5th century). (Note: The whole book of 2 Kings is missing from the extant Codex Sinaiticus.)

=== Old Testament references ===
- 2 Kings 11:1–3: 2 Chronicles 22:10–12
- 2 Kings 11:4–12: 2 Chronicles 23:1–11
- 2 Kings 11:13–16: 2 Chronicles 23:12–15
- 2 Kings 11:17–21: 2 Chronicles 23:16–21

== Analysis ==
A parallel pattern of sequence is observed in the final sections of 2 Kings between 2 Kings 11–20 and 2 Kings 21–25, as follows:

A. Athaliah, daughter of Ahab, kills royal seed (2 Kings 11:1)

B. Joash reigns (2 Kings 11–12)

C. Quick sequence of kings of Israel and Judah (2 Kings 13–16)

D. Fall of Samaria (2 Kings 17)

E. Revival of Judah under Hezekiah (2 Kings 18–20)

A'. Manasseh, a king like Ahab, promotes idolatry and kills the innocence (2 Kings 21)

B'. Josiah reigns (2 Kings 22–23)

C'. Quick succession of kings of Judah (2 Kings 24)

D'. Fall of Jerusalem (2 Kings 25)

E'. Elevation of Jehoiachin (2 Kings 25:27–30)

== Athaliah's accession to power and Joash's rescue (11:1–3) ==
The record of Athaliah's reign in Judah was treated structurally as an appendix of the regnal account of Ahaziah ben Jehoram, the king of Judah (2 Kings 8:25–11:20), or as a revolt of a usurper (cf. northern tribes against Rehoboah in 1 Kings 12; Jehu's revolt against Jehoram in 2 Kings 9–10), so it lacks the usual formal structure of regnal accounts. Athaliah was Omri's 'granddaughter' (2 Kings 8:26), who married to Joram of the Davidic royal family and became the queen mother of Ahaziah ben Joram (2 Kings 8:18). When Jehu's coup left her with no male relatives in either Samaria or Jerusalem, she reacted brutally as a mass murderer of David's house (of what remained after Jehu's slaughter in 2 Kings 10:12–14) and—despite being a woman and an Omride—became the ruler of Judah, effectively personifying the Omridic politics that was violently cut away from (northern) Israel, for a further six years in Judah.

=== Verse 1 ===
And when Athaliah the mother of Ahaziah saw that her son was dead, she arose and destroyed all the seed royal.

- Cross reference: 2 Chronicles 22:10
- "Arose": from the Hebrew verb קוּם , qum ("arise"); here is used in an auxiliary sense to indicate that Athaliah embarked on a campaign to destroy the royal offspring. Athaliah inherited much of her mother Jezebel's character, influencing her husband, king Jehoram, to introduce the Baal-worship into Judah (2 Kings 8:18; 2 Chronicles 2:5, 11), and her son, king Ahaziah, to maintain it (2 Kings 8:27; 2 Chronicles 22:3, "in the ways of the house of Ahab: for his mother was his counselor to do wickedly"). With the death of Ahaziah, her position as "queen mother" (Hebrew: gebirah) would be seriously imperiled, when the crown would have passed naturally to one of her grandchildren, one of the sons of Ahaziah, and the position of queen mother would have passed to the widow of Ahaziah, the mother of the new king. Therefore, she took the bold resolution to eliminate all male members of the house of David: Ahaziah's sons and 'brethren'. When Joash ben Ahaziah later became king of Judah, his mother Zibiah of Beersheba (2 Kings 12:2) would become the queen mother, if she was still alive (her fate was not recorded in the Bible).

=== Verse 2 ===
But Jehosheba, the daughter of king Joram, sister of Ahaziah, took Joash the son of Ahaziah, and stole him from among the king's sons which were slain; and they hid him, even him and his nurse, in the bedchamber from Athaliah, so that he was not slain.

- Cross reference: 2 Chronicles 22:11
- "Jehosheba": spelled as "Jehoshabeath" in 2 Chronicles 22:11.
- "Joash": an alternative spelling for "Jehoash".

== Joash's enthronement and Athaliah's death (11:4–21) ==
The priest Jehoiada played a significant role in deposing Athaliah and putting the 7-year-old Joash on the throne after keeping the future king hidden for six years (2 Kings 12:1). Jehoiada built up a 'subversive organization in the temple with a good infrastructure, sufficient weaponry', and a close relationship with the 'people of the land' (verses 14, 18, 20). The final sentence of verse 20 (contrasting the land/Judah and the city/Jerusalem) gives indication on the political constellation: Athaliah, like all Omrides, enjoyed the support of the urban and aristocratic circles of the capital city, whereas the opposition (such as also Jehu) received the support from the provincial farming population. The religious factors also played a role in the overthrow in Judah, as Jehoiada was a priest of the temple of Jerusalem, where since the time of Solomon, there had been syncretistic and strictly YHWH-worshipping tendencies there (cf. e.g. 1 Kings 15:13; 2 Kings 18:4, 22), so the revolt might include anti-Baal sentiment (verse 18a). This chapter is a Judean counterpart to Jehu's revolt (2 Kings 9–10), which also eliminated a queen (Jezebel) and the Baal worship in (northern) Israel six years earlier.

=== Verse 12 ===
And he brought out the king’s son, put the crown on him, and gave him the Testimony; they made him king and anointed him, and they clapped their hands and said, "Long live the king!"

- "The Testimony": that is, "the Law" (Exodus 25:16, 21; Deuteronomy 31:9).

=== Verse 14 ===
And when she looked, behold, the king stood by a pillar, as the manner was, and the princes and the trumpeters by the king, and all the people of the land rejoiced, and blew with trumpets: and Athaliah rent her clothes, and cried, Treason, Treason.

- Cross reference: 2 Chronicles 23:13
- "Stood by a pillar, as the manner was" (KJV) or "according to the custom" (NRSV): emphasizing that 'even the king could not enter the temple'. The pillar could be Jachin or Boaz (2 Chronicles 3:15–17).

=== Verse 18 ===
And all the people of the land went to the temple of Baal, and tore it down. They thoroughly broke in pieces its altars and images, and killed Mattan the priest of Baal before the altars. And the priest appointed officers over the house of the Lord.

- "Images": or "idols.
- "Mattan the priest of Baal": compared to arrays of Baal priests of Jezebel in Samaria, there was no other priest of Baal in Judah, indicating that the Baal worship was not accepted in the land of Judah beyond the royal court in Jerusalem.
- "Officers": literally "offices".

=== Verse 21 ===
Jehoash was seven years old when he began to reign.

- Cross reference: 2 Chronicles 24:1
- "Jehoash": an alternate spelling of "Joash".

== See also ==
- Ahab
- Chronicles of the Kings of Judah
- David
- Eunuch
- Jehosheba
- Jehoram
- Related Bible parts: 2 Kings 10, 2 Kings 12, 2 Chronicles 22, 2 Chronicles 23

== Sources ==
- Cogan, Mordechai; Tadmor, Hayim (1988). II Kings: A New Translation. Anchor Yale Bible Commentaries. Vol. 11. Doubleday. ISBN 9780385023887.
- Collins, John J. (2014). "Chapter 14: 1 Kings 12 – 2 Kings 25". Introduction to the Hebrew Scriptures. Fortress Press. pp. 277–296. ISBN 9781451469233.
- Coogan, Michael David (2007). Coogan, Michael David; Brettler, Marc Zvi; Newsom, Carol Ann; Perkins, Pheme (eds.). The New Oxford Annotated Bible with the Apocryphal/Deuterocanonical Books: New Revised Standard Version, Issue 48 (Augmented 3rd ed.). Oxford University Press. ISBN 9780195288810.
- Dietrich, Walter (2007). "13. 1 and 2 Kings". In Barton, John; Muddiman, John (eds.). The Oxford Bible Commentary (first (paperback) ed.). Oxford University Press. pp. 232–266. ISBN 978-0199277186.
- Fretheim, Terence E (1997). First and Second Kings. Westminster John Knox Press. ISBN 978-0-664-25565-7.
- Halley, Henry H. (1965). Halley's Bible Handbook: an abbreviated Bible commentary (24th (revised) ed.). Zondervan Publishing House. ISBN 0-310-25720-4.
- Huey, F. B. (1993). The New American Commentary - Jeremiah, Lamentations: An Exegetical and Theological Exposition of Holy Scripture, NIV Text. B&H Publishing Group. ISBN 9780805401165.
- Leithart, Peter J. (2006). 1 & 2 Kings. Brazos Theological Commentary on the Bible. Brazos Press. ISBN 978-1587431258.
- Mathys, H. P. (2007). "14. 1 and 2 Chronicles". In Barton, John; Muddiman, John (eds.). The Oxford Bible Commentary (first (paperback) ed.). Oxford University Press. pp. 267–308. ISBN 978-0199277186.
- McFall, Leslie (1991), "Translation Guide to the Chronological Data in Kings and Chronicles" (PDF), Bibliotheca Sacra, 148: 3–45, archived from the original (PDF) on August 27, 2010
- McKane, William (1993). "Kings, Book of". In Metzger, Bruce M; Coogan, Michael D (eds.). The Oxford Companion to the Bible. Oxford University Press. pp. 409–413. ISBN 978-0195046458.
- Nelson, Richard Donald (1987). First and Second Kings. Westminster John Knox Press. ISBN 978-0-664-22084-6.
- Pritchard, James B (1969). Ancient Near Eastern texts relating to the Old Testament (3 ed.). Princeton University Press. ISBN 9780691035031.
- Sweeney, Marvin (2007). I & II Kings: A Commentary. Westminster John Knox Press. ISBN 978-0-664-22084-6.
- Thiele, Edwin R. (1983). The Mysterious Numbers of the Hebrew Kings (3rd ed.). Grand Rapids, Michigan: Zondervan. ISBN 978-0-310-36010-0.
- Würthwein, Ernst (1995). The Text of the Old Testament. Translated by Rhodes, Erroll F. Grand Rapids, MI: Wm. B. Eerdmans. ISBN 0-8028-0788-7.
