= 2 Chronicles 24 =

Second Book of Chronicles, chapter 24

- ← chapter 23 chapter 25 →
- The complete Hebrew text of the Books of Chronicles (1st and 2nd Chronicles) in the Leningrad Codex (1008 CE).
- Book: Books of Chronicles
- Category: Ketuvim
- Christian Bible part: Old Testament
- Order in the Christian part: 14

2 Chronicles 24 is the twenty-fourth chapter of the Second Book of Chronicles the Old Testament in the Christian Bible or of the second part of the Books of Chronicles in the Hebrew Bible. The book is compiled from older sources by an unknown person or group, designated by modern scholars as "the Chronicler", and had the final shape established in late fifth or fourth century BCE. This chapter belongs to the section focusing on the kingdom of Judah until its destruction by the Babylonians under Nebuchadnezzar and the beginning of restoration under Cyrus the Great of Persia (2 Chronicles 10 to 36). The focus of this chapter is the reign of Joash, king of Judah.

== Text ==
This chapter was originally written in the Hebrew language and is divided into 27 verses.

=== Textual witnesses ===
Some early manuscripts containing the text of this chapter in Hebrew are of the Masoretic Text tradition, which includes the Aleppo Codex (10th century), and Codex Leningradensis (1008).

There is also a translation into Koine Greek known as the Septuagint, made in the last few centuries BCE. Extant ancient manuscripts of the Septuagint version include Codex Vaticanus (B; $\mathfrak{G}$^{B}; 4th century), and Codex Alexandrinus (A; $\mathfrak{G}$^{A}; 5th century). (Note: The whole book of 2 Chronicles is missing from the extant Codex Sinaiticus.)

=== Old Testament references ===
- 2 Chronicles 24:1–14: 2 Kings 12:1–16
- 2 Chronicles 24:23–27: 2 Kings 12:17–21

== Joash repairs the Temple (24:1–16) ==
The Chronicles divide the reign of Joash into two periods: before and after the death of Jehoiada (verse 2: 'all the days of the priest Jehoiada'; cf. 2 Kings 12:2 : 'all his days, because the priest Jehoiada instructed him'). During his good period, Joash displayed strong leadership in rebuilding the neglected Temple in Jerusalem. This efforts occurred as long as Jehoiada is alive, the only priest recorded to live longer than Aaron (verses 15–16; cf. Numbers 33:39) and to be buried 'among the kings', a clear expression of Jehoiada's status as a "regal priest".

=== Verse 1 ===
Joash was seven years old when he began to reign, and he reigned forty years in Jerusalem. His mother's name also was Zibiah of Beersheba.

- Cross references: 2 Kings 11:21; 2 Kings 12:1
- "Forty years": in Thiele's chronology Joash became king between April and September 835 BCE then died between April and September 796 BCE.

== The wickedness of Joash (24:17–22) ==
The Chronicles use the phrases 'abandoned the house of the LORD', 'sacred poles', and 'idols'. to describe Joah's wickedness, followed by the important theological statement in the books: 'the Lord gives sinners the opportunity to return to his way by sending prophets to them' (verse 19), punctuated by the word of Zechariah, the son of Jehoiada, 'because you have forsaken the LORD, he has also forsaken you' (verse 20). Joash reacted shockingly by ordering Zechariah to be stoned to death in the forecourt of the temple, showing no gratitude to Jehoiada. Zechariah's dying words resembles the lines of Exodus 5:21.

== Death of Joash (24:23–27) ==
This section parallels to 2 Kings 12:17–18 but with more emphasize to theological aspect: the Arameans were greatly outnumbered by the Judeans (who abandoned God), yet they prevailed over Judah, which is in contrast to the theme of a small Judean force defeating powerful armies with the help of God in the past. Joash was buried in the city of David (on account of his earlier good behavior), but not amongst the kings (because of his sins; verses 25–26).

=== Verse 27 ===
Now concerning his sons, and the greatness of the burdens laid upon him, and the repairing of the house of God, behold, they are written in the story of the book of the kings. And Amaziah his son reigned in his stead.

- Cross references: 2 Kings 12:19
- "Story": translating the term midrash, which appears only in one other passage in the Hebrew Bible (2 Chronicles 13:22).

== See also ==
- Amaziah of Judah
- Athaliah
- Beersheba
- David
- Jerusalem
- Kohen
- Moses
- Torah
- Related Bible parts: 2 Kings 12, 2 Chronicles 22, 2 Chronicles 23

== Sources ==
- Ackroyd, Peter R (1993). "Chronicles, Books of". In Metzger, Bruce M; Coogan, Michael D (eds.). The Oxford Companion to the Bible. Oxford University Press. pp. 113–116. ISBN 978-0195046458.
- Bennett, William (2018). The Expositor's Bible: The Books of Chronicles. Litres. ISBN 978-5040825196.
- Coogan, Michael David (2007). Coogan, Michael David; Brettler, Marc Zvi; Newsom, Carol Ann; Perkins, Pheme (eds.). The New Oxford Annotated Bible with the Apocryphal/Deuterocanonical Books: New Revised Standard Version, Issue 48 (Augmented 3rd ed.). Oxford University Press. ISBN 9780195288810.
- Mabie, Frederick (2017). "I. The Chronicler's Genealogical Survey of All Israel". In Longman III, Tremper; Garland, David E (eds.). 1 and 2 Chronicles. The Expositor's Bible Commentary. Zondervan. pp. 267–308. ISBN 978-0310531814.
- Mathys, H. P. (2007). "14. 1 and 2 Chronicles". In Barton, John; Muddiman, John (eds.). The Oxford Bible Commentary (first (paperback) ed.). Oxford University Press. pp. 267–308. ISBN 978-0199277186.
- McFall, Leslie (1991), "Translation Guide to the Chronological Data in Kings and Chronicles" (PDF), Bibliotheca Sacra, 148: 3–45, archived from the original (PDF) on 2010-08-27
- Thiele, Edwin R. (1983). The Mysterious Numbers of the Hebrew Kings (3rd ed.). Grand Rapids, Michigan: Zondervan. ISBN 978-0-310-36010-0.
- Würthwein, Ernst (1995). The Text of the Old Testament. Translated by Rhodes, Erroll F. Grand Rapids, MI: William B. Eerdmans. ISBN 0-8028-0788-7.
