= 2 Kings 12 =

2 Kings, chapter 12

- ← chapter 11 chapter 13 →
- The pages containing the Books of Kings (1 & 2 Kings) Leningrad Codex (1008 CE).
- Book: Second Book of Kings
- Hebrew Bible part: Nevi'im
- Order in the Hebrew part: 4
- Category: Former Prophets
- Christian Bible part: Old Testament
- Order in the Christian part: 12

2 Kings 12 is the twelfth chapter of the second part of the Books of Kings in the Hebrew Bible or the Second Book of Kings in the Old Testament of the Christian Bible. The book is a compilation of various annals recording the acts of the kings of Israel and Judah by a Deuteronomic compiler in the seventh century BCE, with a supplement added in the sixth century BCE. This chapter records the reign of Joash as the king of Judah.

== Text ==
This chapter was originally written in the Hebrew language. It is divided into 21 verses in Christian Bibles, but into 22 verses in the Hebrew Bible as in the verse numbering comparison table below.

=== Verse numbering ===
Verse numbering for 2 Kings 11–12
| English | Hebrew |
|---|---|
| 11:21 | 12:1 |
| 12:1–21 | 12:2–22 |

This article generally follows the common numbering in Christian English Bible versions, with notes to the numbering in Hebrew Bible versions.

=== Textual witnesses ===
Some early manuscripts containing the text of this chapter in Hebrew are of the Masoretic Text tradition, which includes the Codex Cairensis (895), Aleppo Codex (10th century), and Codex Leningradensis (1008).

There is also a translation into Koine Greek known as the Septuagint, made in the last few centuries BCE. Extant ancient manuscripts of the Septuagint version include Codex Vaticanus (B; $\mathfrak{G}$^{B}; 4th century) and Codex Alexandrinus (A; $\mathfrak{G}$^{A}; 5th century). (Note: The whole book of 2 Kings is missing from the extant Codex Sinaiticus.)

=== Old Testament references ===
- 2 Kings 12:1–16: 2 Chronicles 24:1–14
- 2 Kings 12:17–21: 2 Chronicles 24:23–27

== Analysis ==
A parallel pattern of sequence is observed in the final sections of 2 Kings between 2 Kings 11–20 and 2 Kings 21–25, as follows:

A. Athaliah, daughter of Ahab, kills royal seed (2 Kings 11:1)

B. Joash reigns (2 Kings 11–12)

C. Quick sequence of kings of Israel and Judah (2 Kings 13–16)

D. Fall of Samaria (2 Kings 17)

E. Revival of Judah under Hezekiah (2 Kings 18–20)

A'. Manasseh, a king like Ahab, promotes idolatry and kills the innocence (2 Kings 21)

B'. Josiah reigns (2 Kings 22–23)

C'. Quick succession of kings of Judah (2 Kings 24)

D'. Fall of Jerusalem (2 Kings 25)

E'. Elevation of Jehoiachin (2 Kings 25:27–30)

This chapter consists of three parts:

1. Introductory regnal information (verses 1–3; also 11:21)
2. Account of reign (verses 4–18) with two episodes
  1. Joash's financial arrangement for temple repairs (verses 4–16) and
  2. Joash's payment to Hazael from the temple fund to ward off the attack of the Arameas (verses 17–18)
3. Concluding regnal information (verses 19–21)

== The Temple renovation during the reign of Joash (12:1–16) ==
Joash (or Jehoash) is given a relatively positive rating in the books of Kings, first because of his succession to replace the Omride queen Athaliah, and secondly due to his care of the temple of YHWH (the Chronicler notes that Jehoash became corrupt after the death of Jehoiada; 2 Chronicles 24:15–22). Joash arranged that temple renovation was no longer solely directed by the priests, but was decreed by the palace, and that donations for this project were placed in a collection box, to be counted communally at intervals, then given to a building administration (verses 6–12, 15). As animal and vegetable sacrifices were reserved for God and his priests (verse 17), others could be made by paying in silver (shekel), so a group of lower caste 'priests who guarded the threshold' was assigned to deposit these in a designated chest (according to 2 Chronices 24:10, by the time of exile, the believers threw their money into the collection box themselves).

=== Verse 1 ===
In the seventh year of Jehu Jehoash began to reign; and forty years reigned he in Jerusalem. And his mother's name was Zibiah of Beersheba.

- Cross reference: 2 Chronicles 24:1
- "Jehoash": an alternate spelling of Joash (son of Ahaziah) as in 11:2; also verses 2, 4, 6, 7, 18.
- "Forty years": According to Thiele's chronology, following "non-accession year method", Jehoash was the king of Israel starting between April and September 835 BCE until his death between April and September 796 BCE.

=== Verse 6 ===
Now it was so, by the twenty-third year of King Jehoash, that the priests had not repaired the damages of the temple.

- "The 23th year of King Jehoash": According to Thiele's chronology, this period of time falls in 814/813 BCE.

== Joash's reign (12:17–21) ==
During the later parts of Joash's reign, Hazael, the king of Aram in Damascus (cf. 1 Kings 19:15–17; 2 Kings 8:7–15), placed both the northern kingdom of Jehu (cf. 2 Kings 10:32–33) and the kingdom of Judah under heavy burden of tributes. The threat of Hazael to Jerusalem indicates a continuous concern for the Aramean invasion to the land of Israel since the time of Omri's dynasty to the early parts of Jehu's dynasty until king Jehoash ben Jehoahaz of Israel (the third in Jehu's line of kings) defeated the Arameans following the death of prophet Elisha (2 Kings 13:14–21). The payment of tribute to Hazael may mean that all the funds for temple repairs collected by Jehoash (and his predecessors, such as Jehoshaphat, Jehoram and Ahaziah) were lost to the Arameans.

Jehoash's assassination could be explained from historiographical perspectives, beginning with Jehoshaphat giving his son Jehoram in marriage to Athaliah, so the house of David thereafter descended from the house of Omri, and the next three kings of Judah (three generations) were assassinated (Note: Ahaziah of Judah was murdered by Jehu's soldiers (2 Kings 9:27–28), Jehoash ben Ahaziah by his servants (2 Kings 12:20–21), and so was Amaziah, his son (2 Kings 14:19–20)) as the consequences of Elijah's prophecy that every male of Ahab in Israel would be cut off (2 Kings 21:21) until the reign of Uzziah ben Amaziah of Judah which coincides the time king Jeroboam ben Jehoash of Israel restored the borders of Israel.

=== Verse 19 ===
And the rest of the acts of Joash, and all that he did, are they not written in the book of the chronicles of the kings of Judah?

- Cross reference: 2 Chronicles 24:27
- "Are they not written in the book of the chronicles of the kings of Judah?": This formal phrase concludes the account of almost every king of Judah (1 Kings 14:29; 1 Kings 15:7, 23; 1 Kings 22:45; 2 Kings 8:23; 2 Kings 14:18; 2 Kings 15:6, etc.).

=== Verse 21 ===
For Jozachar the son of Shimeath and Jehozabad the son of Shomer, his servants, struck him. So he died, and they buried him with his fathers in the City of David. Then Amaziah his son reigned in his place.

- Cross reference: 2 Chronicles 24:26
- "Jozachar": or "Zabad" in 2 Chronicles 24:26.
- "Shomer: or "Shimrith" in 2 Chronicles 24:26.

== See also ==
- Ahaziah
- Aram
- Beersheba
- Chronicles of the Kings of Judah
- David
- Gath
- Jehoiada
- Jehoshaphat
- Jehu
- Jerusalem
- Millo
- Shomer
- Related Bible parts: 2 Kings 10, 2 Kings 11, 2 Chronicles 24

== Sources ==
- Cogan, Mordechai; Tadmor, Hayim (1988). II Kings: A New Translation. Anchor Yale Bible Commentaries. Vol. 11. Doubleday. ISBN 9780385023887.
- Collins, John J. (2014). "Chapter 14: 1 Kings 12 – 2 Kings 25". Introduction to the Hebrew Scriptures. Fortress Press. pp. 277–296. ISBN 9781451469233.
- Coogan, Michael David (2007). Coogan, Michael David; Brettler, Marc Zvi; Newsom, Carol Ann; Perkins, Pheme (eds.). The New Oxford Annotated Bible with the Apocryphal/Deuterocanonical Books: New Revised Standard Version, Issue 48 (Augmented 3rd ed.). Oxford University Press. ISBN 9780195288810.
- Dietrich, Walter (2007). "13. 1 and 2 Kings". In Barton, John; Muddiman, John (eds.). The Oxford Bible Commentary (first (paperback) ed.). Oxford University Press. pp. 232–266. ISBN 978-0199277186.
- Fretheim, Terence E (1997). First and Second Kings. Westminster John Knox Press. ISBN 978-0-664-25565-7.
- Halley, Henry H. (1965). Halley's Bible Handbook: an abbreviated Bible commentary (24th (revised) ed.). Zondervan Publishing House. ISBN 0-310-25720-4.
- Huey, F. B. (1993). The New American Commentary - Jeremiah, Lamentations: An Exegetical and Theological Exposition of Holy Scripture, NIV Text. B&H Publishing Group. ISBN 9780805401165.
- Leithart, Peter J. (2006). 1 & 2 Kings. Brazos Theological Commentary on the Bible. Brazos Press. ISBN 978-1587431258.
- McFall, Leslie (1991), "Translation Guide to the Chronological Data in Kings and Chronicles" (PDF), Bibliotheca Sacra, 148: 3–45, archived from the original (PDF) on August 27, 2010
- McKane, William (1993). "Kings, Book of". In Metzger, Bruce M; Coogan, Michael D (eds.). The Oxford Companion to the Bible. Oxford University Press. pp. 409–413. ISBN 978-0195046458.
- Nelson, Richard Donald (1987). First and Second Kings. Westminster John Knox Press. ISBN 978-0-664-22084-6.
- Pritchard, James B (1969). Ancient Near Eastern texts relating to the Old Testament (3 ed.). Princeton University Press. ISBN 9780691035031.
- Sweeney, Marvin (2007). I & II Kings: A Commentary. Westminster John Knox Press. ISBN 978-0-664-22084-6.
- Thiele, Edwin R. (1983). The Mysterious Numbers of the Hebrew Kings (3rd ed.). Grand Rapids, Michigan: Zondervan. ISBN 978-0-310-36010-0.
- Würthwein, Ernst (1995). The Text of the Old Testament. Translated by Rhodes, Erroll F. Grand Rapids, MI: Wm. B. Eerdmans. ISBN 0-8028-0788-7.
