= 2 Chronicles 23 =

Second Book of Chronicles, chapter 23

- ← chapter 22 chapter 24 →
- The complete Hebrew text of the Books of Chronicles (1st and 2nd Chronicles) in the Leningrad Codex (1008 CE).
- Book: Books of Chronicles
- Category: Ketuvim
- Christian Bible part: Old Testament
- Order in the Christian part: 14

2 Chronicles 23 is the twenty-third chapter of the Second Book of Chronicles the Old Testament in the Christian Bible or of the second part of the Books of Chronicles in the Hebrew Bible. The book is compiled from older sources by an unknown person or group, designated by modern scholars as "the Chronicler", and had the final shape established in late fifth or fourth century BCE. This chapter belongs to the section focusing on the kingdom of Judah until its destruction by the Babylonians under Nebuchadnezzar and the beginning of restoration under Cyrus the Great of Persia (2 Chronicles 10 to 36). The focus of this chapter is the reigns of Athaliah and Joash, rulers of Judah.

== Text ==
This chapter was originally written in the Hebrew language and is divided into 21 verses.

=== Textual witnesses ===
Some early manuscripts containing the text of this chapter in Hebrew are of the Masoretic Text tradition, which includes the Aleppo Codex (10th century), and Codex Leningradensis (1008).

There is also a translation into Koine Greek known as the Septuagint, made in the last few centuries BCE. Extant ancient manuscripts of the Septuagint version include Codex Vaticanus (B; $\mathfrak{G}$^{B}; 4th century), and Codex Alexandrinus (A; $\mathfrak{G}$^{A}; 5th century). (Note: The whole book of 2 Chronicles is missing from the extant Codex Sinaiticus.)

=== Old Testament references ===
- 2 Chronicles 23:1–11: 2 Kings 11:4–12
- 2 Chronicles 23:12–15: 2 Kings 11:13–16
- 2 Chronicles 23:16–21: 2 Kings 11:17–21

== Joash anointed king of Judah (23:1–11) ==
The section describes the anointing of Joash as the king of Judah (verses 1–3 parallel to 2 Kings 11:4) involving not only the 'captains of the royal guard', but also the Levites, 'the heads of the families of Israel' and the 'entire community', Except for Elishaphat, all other names can be found in the lists of priests and Levites in the books of Ezra, Nehemiah, and Chronicles. The temple personnel organization and working schedule (1 Chronicles 23–26) were indicated in verse 8 ('for the priest Jehoiada did not dismiss the divisions').

=== Verse 11 ===
And they brought out the king's son, put the crown on him, gave him the Testimony, and made him king. Then Jehoiada and his sons anointed him, and said, “Long live the king!”

- Cross references: 2 Kings 11:12
- "Testimony": from Hebrew word עֵדוּת, ʿedut, normally means "witness" or "law" (cf. Exodus 25:16, 21; 31:18), but could also refer to 'some tangible symbol of kingship', such as 'an amulet or neck chain', or perhaps 'a document', such as 'a copy of the royal protocol or of the stipulations of the Davidic covenant'.
- "Long live the king": from Hebrew יחְיִ הַמֶּלֶך, yə-ḥî ha-me-leḵ, literally "Let the king live!" (1 Samuel 10:24; 2 Samuel 16:16; 1 Kings 1:25, 31, 34, 39).

== Death of Athaliah (23:12–15) ==
The section about the slaughter of Athaliah (verses 12–15) parallels closely to 2 Kings 11:13–16. Athaliah heard the 'noise of the people' which is an 'unusual commotion', accompanied by the 'blast of the trumpets and the vehement acclamations of the people' across the Tyropœon and this attracted her attention, or 'excited her fears'. She was caught by the guards and taken "by the way by the which horses came into the king's house: and there was she slain" (2 Kings 11:16). Josephus explains that "the way" refers to the road to bring the horses into the king's (horses') house (not into [the king's house] of residence) or "hippodrome" (the gate of the king's mules) that was built on the southeast of the temple, near the horse gate in the valley of Kidron Athaliah's reign was the 'gravest threat' to the continuation of Davidic dynasty.

=== Verse 13 ===
And she looked, and, behold, the king stood at his pillar at the entering in, and the princes and the trumpets by the king: and all the people of the land rejoiced, and sounded with trumpets, also the singers with instruments of musick, and such as taught to sing praise. Then Athaliah rent her clothes, and said, Treason, Treason.

- Cross references: 2 Kings 11:14
- "Stood at his pillar at the entering in": could be rendered as 'at his place at the entrance' (cf. 2 Kings 11:14 reads "stood by a pillar, as the manner was" (KJV) or "according to the custom" (NRSV)), emphasizing that 'even the king could not enter the temple'. The pillar could be Jachin or Boaz (2 Chronicles 3:15–17).

== Jehoiada restored the worship of the LORD (23:16–21) ==
The high priest Jehoiada organized the offices (priests and Levites) and their duties (sacrifices and music) to undo the damage inflicted by Athaliah and prior rulers (cf. 2 Kings 11:17–20) and bring back to the law of Moses and David's orders (as Moses made no law concerning music for worship). Jerusalem became 'quiet' is a 'sign of divine blessing (1 Chronicles 4:40; 22:9; 2 Chronicles 14:1, 6; 20:30).

== See also ==
- Ahab
- Ahaziah of Judah
- David
- Jerusalem
- Kohen
- Moses
- Torah
- Related Bible parts: 2 Kings 11, 2 Chronicles 22

== Sources ==
- Ackroyd, Peter R (1993). "Chronicles, Books of". In Metzger, Bruce M; Coogan, Michael D (eds.). The Oxford Companion to the Bible. Oxford University Press. pp. 113–116. ISBN 978-0195046458.
- Bennett, William (2018). The Expositor's Bible: The Books of Chronicles. Litres. ISBN 978-5040825196.
- Coogan, Michael David (2007). Coogan, Michael David; Brettler, Marc Zvi; Newsom, Carol Ann; Perkins, Pheme (eds.). The New Oxford Annotated Bible with the Apocryphal/Deuterocanonical Books: New Revised Standard Version, Issue 48 (Augmented 3rd ed.). Oxford University Press. ISBN 9780195288810.
- Mabie, Frederick (2017). "I. The Chronicler's Genealogical Survey of All Israel". In Longman III, Tremper; Garland, David E (eds.). 1 and 2 Chronicles. The Expositor's Bible Commentary. Zondervan. pp. 267–308. ISBN 978-0310531814.
- Mathys, H. P. (2007). "14. 1 and 2 Chronicles". In Barton, John; Muddiman, John (eds.). The Oxford Bible Commentary (first (paperback) ed.). Oxford University Press. pp. 267–308. ISBN 978-0199277186.
- McFall, Leslie (1991), "Translation Guide to the Chronological Data in Kings and Chronicles" (PDF), Bibliotheca Sacra, 148: 3-45, archived from the original (PDF) on 2010-08-27
- Thiele, Edwin R. (1983). The Mysterious Numbers of the Hebrew Kings (3rd ed.). Grand Rapids, Michigan: Zondervan. ISBN 978-0-310-36010-0.
- Würthwein, Ernst (1995). The Text of the Old Testament. Translated by Rhodes, Erroll F. Grand Rapids, MI: William B. Eerdmans. ISBN 0-8028-0788-7.
