= 2 Chronicles 22 =

Second Book of Chronicles, chapter 22

- ← chapter 21 chapter 23 →
- The complete Hebrew text of the Books of Chronicles (1st and 2nd Chronicles) in the Leningrad Codex (1008 CE).
- Book: Books of Chronicles
- Category: Ketuvim
- Christian Bible part: Old Testament
- Order in the Christian part: 14

2 Chronicles 22 is the twenty-second chapter of the Second Book of Chronicles the Old Testament in the Christian Bible or of the second part of the Books of Chronicles in the Hebrew Bible. The book is compiled from older sources by an unknown person or group, designated by modern scholars as "the Chronicler", and had the final shape established in late fifth or fourth century BCE. This chapter belongs to the section focusing on the kingdom of Judah until its destruction by the Babylonians under Nebuchadnezzar and the beginning of restoration under Cyrus the Great of Persia (2 Chronicles 10 to 36). The focus of this chapter is the reigns of Ahaziah and Athaliah, rulers of Judah.

== Text ==
This chapter was originally written in the Hebrew language and is divided into 12 verses.

=== Textual witnesses ===
Some early manuscripts containing the text of this chapter in Hebrew are of the Masoretic Text tradition, which includes the Aleppo Codex (10th century), and Codex Leningradensis (1008).

There is also a translation into Koine Greek known as the Septuagint, made in the last few centuries BCE. Extant ancient manuscripts of the Septuagint version include Codex Vaticanus (B; $\mathfrak{G}$^{B}; 4th century), and Codex Alexandrinus (A; $\mathfrak{G}$^{A}; 5th century). (Note: The whole book of 2 Chronicles is missing from the extant Codex Sinaiticus.)

=== Old Testament references ===
- 2 Chronicles 22:1–7: 2 Kings 8:25–29
- 2 Chronicles 22:8–9: 2 Kings 9:14–29
- 2 Chronicles 22:10–12: 2 Kings 11:1–3

== Ahaziah, king of Judah (22:1–9) ==
The section contains the record of Ahaziah's reign, with some events in the northern kingdom mentioned as necessary. Verses 1–6 correspond with 2 Kings 8:24b–29, whereas verses 7–9 are concise parallels to 2 Kings 9:1–28 and 10:12–14. Uniquely in verse 1, Ahaziah was said to be made king by the "people of Jerusalem", while elsewhere in the Hebrew Bible involving the "people of the land". It refers back to 2 Chronicles 21:17 for the explanation why the youngest of all Jehoram's sons should become king. The alliance with the northern kingdom and the emulation of its worship practices in Ahaziah's time threatened the elimination of Davidic dynasty as well as the traditional Temple worship practice in Jerusalem (2 Chronicles 23:18; 24:7). Verse 9 provides another point of view concerning Ahaziah's death in comparison to 1 Kings 9 which recorded that Ahaziah was wounded while fleeing near Ibleam, but reached Megiddo, where he died, whereas the Chronicler only records that Ahaziah died in Samaria, the 'evil capital'. The Chronicler does not explicitly confirm that Ahaziah was buried is Samaria, only that he received a burial for the sake of his God-fearing ancestor, Jehoshaphat, so it is not a contradiction to the statement in 1 Kings 9 that Ahaziah's dead body was brought to Jerusalem to be buried there. The anointing of Jehu and the assassination of Joram, king of Israel were described in 2 Kings 9:1–26.

=== Verse 2 ===
Ahaziah was forty-two years old when he became king, and he reigned one year in Jerusalem. His mother’s name was Athaliah the granddaughter of Omri.

- Cross reference: 2 Kings 8:26
- "Forty-two years old": from Hebrew: בן ארבעים ושתים שנה, ben-’ar-bā-‘îm ū-šə-ta-yim šā-nāh, literally "a son of forty-two years". The form is for the most part signify a person's age, but not always (cf. 1 Samuel 13:1), which is the case here, because 2 Kings 8:26 records Ahaziah's age as 22 years old, and Jehoram, his father, died at 40 years old. McFall assumes that the Chronicler counts Ahaziah's period of reign as a part of Omri's dynasty (not in the tradition of David's dynasty), by adding Omri's 6 years reign, Ahab's 22 years and Joram's 12 years to Ahaziah's 2 years for a total of 42 years. Some manuscripts of Greek Septuagint and Syriac version read "22 years" as in 2 Kings 8.
- "Granddaughter": from Hebrew בַּת, bat, literally "daughter"; can also refer to "granddaughter" as here.

== Athaliah, queen of Judah (22:10–12) ==
Entering this section, Ahaziah and the Judean princes ("sons of Ahaziah's brothers"; verse 8) have been murdered, so the kingdom of Judah was in a similar situation to that at the end of Saul's reign (cf. 1 Chronicles 10), giving a significant meaning to the promise for David (cf. 2 Chronicles 23:3).

=== Verse 10 ===
But when Athaliah the mother of Ahaziah saw that her son was dead, she arose and destroyed all the seed royal of the house of Judah.

- Cross reference: 2 Kings 11:1
- "Destroyed all the seed royal": Athaliah was certainly angered by the massacre of her royal family (Ahab's family) by Jehu in the northern kingdom of Israel, and knowing Jehu's commission to extirpate the whole of Ahab's posterity, she expected to be the next target, so she resolved, as her defense and security, to take over the throne and destroy "the seed royal" of Davidic line, because they were against the Phoenician worship of Baal, that she was determined to keep, and because, if any of the young princes became king, his mother would replace Athaliah as the queen mother.

=== Verse 11 ===
But Jehoshabeath, the daughter of the king, took Joash the son of Ahaziah, and stole him away from among the king’s sons who were being murdered, and put him and his nurse in a bedroom. So Jehoshabeath, the daughter of King Jehoram, the wife of Jehoiada the priest (for she was the sister of Ahaziah), hid him from Athaliah so that she did not kill him.

- Cross reference: 2 Kings 11:2

The unique information in the Chronicles that Jehoram's daughter Jehoshabeath (spelled as "Jehosheba" in 2 Kings 11) was the wife of Jehioada, the high priest could be historically reliable, despite the lack of support elsewhere in the Hebrew BIble, and it can explain why she could stay in the temple grounds.

== See also ==
- Ahab
- Ahaziah of Israel
- Ahaziah of Judah
- Arabians
- Ethiopians
- Edom
- Hazael
- Jehoshaphat
- Jehu
- Jerusalem
- Jezreel
- Nimshi
- Omri
- Ramoth-Gilead
- Samaria
- Syria
- Related Bible parts: 2 Kings 8, 2 Kings 9, 2 Kings 10, 2 Kings 11, 2 Chronicles 21

== Sources ==
- Ackroyd, Peter R (1993). "Chronicles, Books of". In Metzger, Bruce M; Coogan, Michael D (eds.). The Oxford Companion to the Bible. Oxford University Press. pp. 113–116. ISBN 978-0195046458.
- Bennett, William (2018). The Expositor's Bible: The Books of Chronicles. Litres. ISBN 978-5040825196.
- Coogan, Michael David (2007). Coogan, Michael David; Brettler, Marc Zvi; Newsom, Carol Ann; Perkins, Pheme (eds.). The New Oxford Annotated Bible with the Apocryphal/Deuterocanonical Books: New Revised Standard Version, Issue 48 (Augmented 3rd ed.). Oxford University Press. ISBN 9780195288810.
- Mabie, Frederick (2017). "I. The Chronicler's Genealogical Survey of All Israel". In Longman III, Tremper; Garland, David E (eds.). 1 and 2 Chronicles. The Expositor's Bible Commentary. Zondervan. pp. 267–308. ISBN 978-0310531814.
- Mathys, H. P. (2007). "14. 1 and 2 Chronicles". In Barton, John; Muddiman, John (eds.). The Oxford Bible Commentary (first (paperback) ed.). Oxford University Press. pp. 267–308. ISBN 978-0199277186.
- McFall, Leslie (1991), "Translation Guide to the Chronological Data in Kings and Chronicles" (PDF), Bibliotheca Sacra, 148: 3-45, archived from the original (PDF) on 2010-08-27
- Thiele, Edwin R. (1983). The Mysterious Numbers of the Hebrew Kings (3rd ed.). Grand Rapids, Michigan: Zondervan. ISBN 978-0-310-36010-0.
- Würthwein, Ernst (1995). The Text of the Old Testament. Translated by Rhodes, Erroll F. Grand Rapids, MI: William B. Eerdmans. ISBN 0-8028-0788-7.
