= 2 Kings 18 =

2 Kings, chapter 18

- ← chapter 17 chapter 19 →
- The pages containing the Books of Kings (1 & 2 Kings) Leningrad Codex (1008 CE).
- Book: Second Book of Kings
- Hebrew Bible part: Nevi'im
- Order in the Hebrew part: 4
- Category: Former Prophets
- Christian Bible part: Old Testament
- Order in the Christian part: 12

2 Kings 18 is the eighteenth chapter of the second part of the Books of Kings in the Hebrew Bible or the Second Book of Kings in the Old Testament of the Christian Bible. The book is a compilation of various annals recording the acts of the kings of Israel and Judah by a Deuteronomic compiler in the seventh century BCE, with a supplement added in the sixth century BCE. This chapter records the events during the reign of Hezekiah, the king of Judah, a part of the section comprising 2 Kings 18:1 to 20:21, with a parallel version in Isaiah 36–39.

== Text ==
This chapter was originally written in the Hebrew language. It is divided into 37 verses.

=== Textual witnesses ===
Some early manuscripts containing the text of this chapter in Hebrew are of the Masoretic Text tradition, which includes the Codex Cairensis (895), Aleppo Codex (10th century (Note: Since 1947 the current text of Aleppo Codex is missing 2 Kings 14:21–18:13.)), and Codex Leningradensis (1008).

There is also a translation into Koine Greek known as the Septuagint, made in the last few centuries BCE. Extant ancient manuscripts of the Septuagint version include Codex Vaticanus (B; $\mathfrak{G}$^{B}; 4th century) and Codex Alexandrinus (A; $\mathfrak{G}$^{A}; 5th century). (Note: The whole book of 2 Kings is missing from the extant Codex Sinaiticus.)

== Analysis ==
This chapter introduces Hezekiah as a 'ultra-righteous king' who relied on YHWH (verses 1–8), the most David-like king since David (verse 3, cf. verse 7 with 1 Samuel 18:14). It is contrasted to the apostate northern kingdom which was then destroyed by the Assyrians (verses 9–12). Prompted by Hezekiah's rebellion (verse 7), Sennacherib, the Assyrian king, came to attack Judah, and even after given large amount of tribute (verses 13–16) still demanded Jerusalem to surrender with convincing argumentation (verses 17–37).

The narrative of the Assyrian siege on Jerusalem in chapter 18 and 19 is presented in a parallel structure:

A Assyrians arrive at Jerusalem (18:13–16)

B messengers from Assyria speak to the people (18:17–37)

C Hezekiah seeks the prophet and prays (19:1–5)

D Isaiah prophesies (19:6–7)

A' Assyrians leave (19:8–9a) (break in text)

B' Assyrian letter to Jerusalem (19:9b–13)

C' Hezekiah responds by entering temple to pray (19:14–19)

D' Isaiah prophesies (19:20–34)

A" Assyrians leave for good (19:35–37)

From 18:17 onwards the editors seem to insert another source, which is also used in the Book of Isaiah, that indicates the Assyrians breaking their word after receiving the tribute and putting further pressure on Hezekiah in Jerusalem (cf. 1 Kings 20:1–7 for the equivalent chain of events).

== Hezekiah, king of Judah (18:1–12) ==
This section highlights Hezekiah's religious reforms which may contribute to an exceptional evaluation: he and Josiah (2 Kings 22:2) alone are comparable to David. The destruction of the Nehushtan, a snake-shaped cultic image traced back to Moses (cf. Numbers 21:9), can really be attributed to Hezekiah, despite little details were reported, among other acts of piety (verses 6–7). Next are Hezekiah's early foreign political activities: he liberated the kingdom of Judah from Assyrian subservience and conducted successful campaigns against the Philistines (verses 7–8). An Assyrian source noted that Hezekiah was the 'leader of an anti-Assyrian coalition from 705 BCE onwards', and he even 'arrested a pro-Assyrian king of Ekron in this capacity'. The editors included the description of the northern Israel kingdom's defeat to the Assyrians (cf. verses 9–11 with 2 Kings 17:3–6), as well as the cause of it, namely, the 'entire population's lack of loyalty to the Torah' (verse 12).

=== Verse 1 ===
Now it came to pass in the third year of Hoshea the son of Elah, king of Israel, that Hezekiah the son of Ahaz, king of Judah, began to reign.

- Cross references: 2 Chronicles 29:1
- "In the 3rd year of Hoshea": According to Thiele's chronology, following "accession year method", Hezekiah became co-regent with his father, Ahaz, in the kingdom of Judah, in September 729 BCE. Based on Thiele-McFall chronology, Hoshea started to reign in Samaria between September 732 and April 731 BCE.
- "Hezekiah the son of Ahaz, king of Judah": A bulla (seal) impression dating to 727–698 BCE with the inscription "לחזקיהו [בן] אחז מלך יהדה", meaning "belonging to Hezekiah [son of] Ahaz king of Judah", was uncovered in a dig at the Ophel in Jerusalem. The impression on this inscription was set in ancient Hebrew script.

=== Verse 2 ===
He was twenty-five years old when he began to reign, and he reigned twenty-nine years in Jerusalem. His mother's name was Abi the daughter of Zechariah.

- Cross references: 2 Chronicles 29:1
- "Reigned 29 years": according to Thiele's chronology, Hezekiah became the sole king after his father died before 1 Nisan (April) 715 BCE, until his death between September 687 and September 686 BCE, for the total of 29 years. Prior to that, Hezekiah became co-regent with his father from September 729 BCE to sometime before 1 Nisan (April) 715 BCE.
- "Abi": written as "Abijah" in the parallel verse 2 Chronicles 29:1.

=== Verse 3 ===
And he did what was right in the eyes of the Lord, according to all that David his father had done.

- "He did what was right": a praise that is only assigned to two other kings of Judah: Asa (1 Kings 15:11) and Josiah (2 Kings 22:2); all three kings were the sons of wicked fathers. Since an early age, Hezekiah likely was taught by prophet Isaiah, who was on familiar terms with his father, king Ahaz (Isaiah 7:3-16).

=== Verse 4 ===
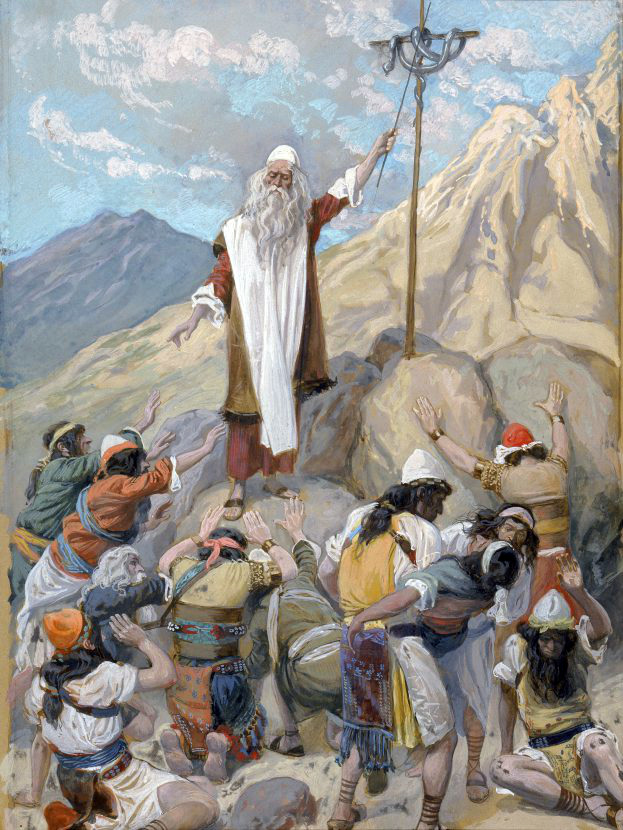
The Brazen Serpent (watercolor circa 1896–1902 by James Tissot)

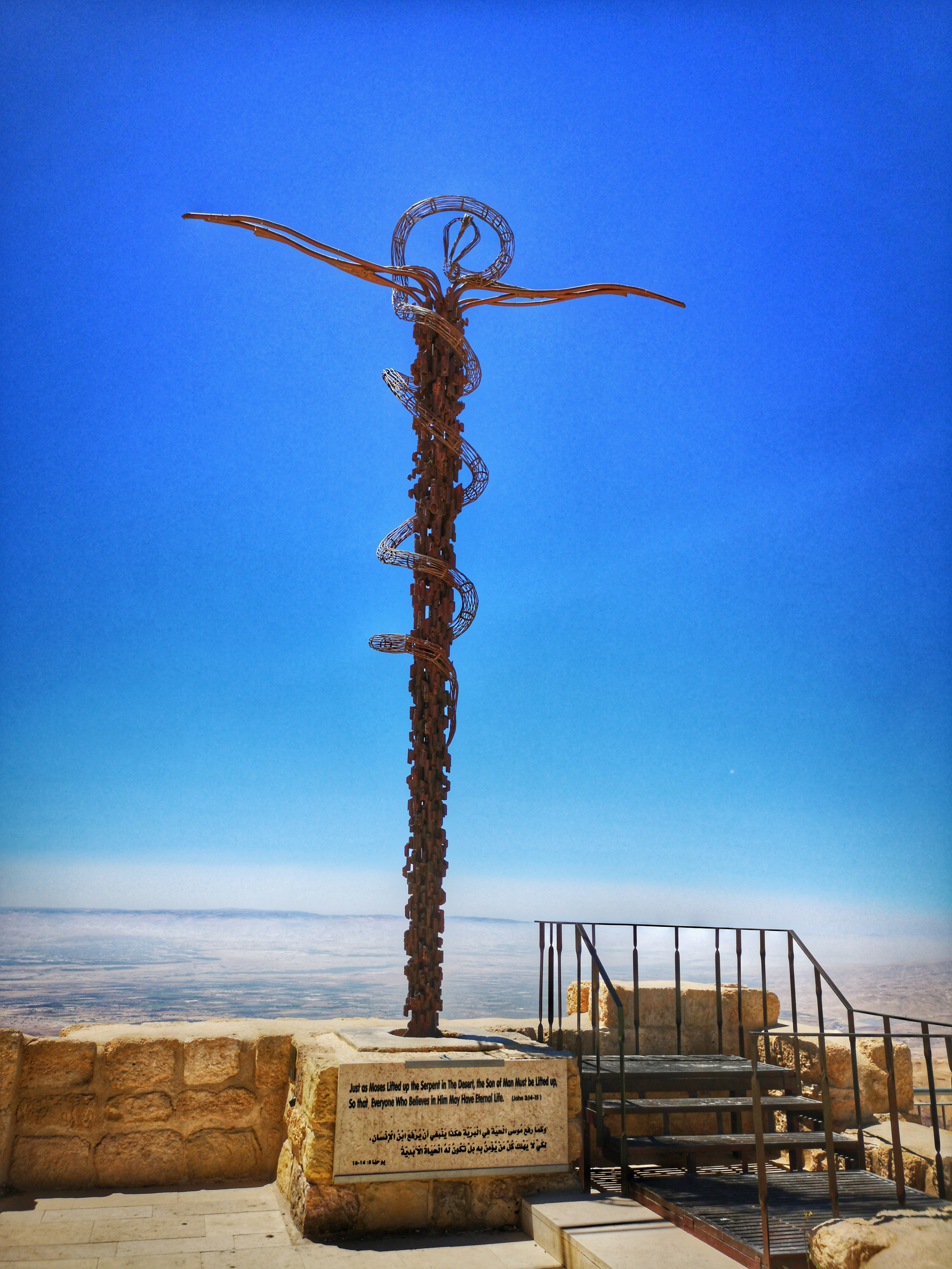
A monument of the bronze serpent (which Moses erected in the Neghev desert) on Mount Nebo, in front of the church of Saint Moses (2018).

He removed the high places and broke the sacred pillars, cut down the wooden image and broke in pieces the bronze serpent that Moses had made; for until those days the children of Israel burned incense to it, and called it Nehushtan.

- "High places": are "places for pagan worship."
- "Wooden image": from Hebrew: Asherah, also the name of a leading Canaanite goddess. The term is singular in the Masoretic Text but plural in the Greek Septuagint texts and other ancient versions, but it is also possible to regard "the singular as a collective singular." The places of worship for Asherah were shrines in or near groves of evergreen trees or at places marked by wooden poles, all of which were to be burned or cut down by the Israelites (Deuteronomy 12:3; 16:21; Judges 6:25, 28, 30; 2 Kings 18:4).
- "Nehushtan": literally, "Bronze Thing", also similar to Hebrew word nahash, meaning "serpent" or נְחַשׁ הַנְּחֹשֶׁת, nekhash hannekhoshet, meaning "bronze serpent." Moses made the bronze serpent pole following the command of YHWH to stop the attack of "fiery serpents" after the Israelistes complaining against YHWH and Moses during the wandering in the wilderness (Numbers 21:4–9). Jesus applied the event of Moses lifting up the bronze serpent pole as a foreshadowing of his own act of salvation through being lifted up on the cross, stating "And as Moses lifted up the serpent in the wilderness, even so must the Son of man be lifted up: That whosoever believeth in him should not perish, but have eternal life. For God so loved the world, that he gave his only begotten Son, that whosoever believeth in him should not perish, but have everlasting life" (John 3:14–16).

=== Verse 5 ===
He trusted in the Lord God of Israel; so that after him was none like him among all the kings of Judah, nor any that were before him.

- "None like him among all the kings of Judah": similar words are used of Josiah in 2 Kings 23:25, but the context shows that the pre-eminence is not the same for the two kings: to Hezekiah is in the "trust in the Lord"; to Josiah is in the "exact observance of the Law".

=== Verse 6 ===
He held fast to the Lord and did not stop following him; he kept the commands the Lord had given Moses.

=== Verse 7 ===
The Lord was with him, and wherever he went he prospered. He rebelled against the king of Assyria and did not serve him.

=== Verse 8 ===
Hezekiah defeated the Philistines all the way to Gaza and its borders, including the watchtowers and the strong, walled cities.

=== Verse 9 ===
In the fourth year of King Hezekiah, which was the seventh year of Hoshea son of Elah, king of Israel, Shalmaneser king of Assyria came up against Samaria and besieged it.

- "In the 4th year of King Hezekiah": according to Thiele-McFall chronology was in the period of his co-regency between September 726 and September 725 BCE. The synchronism limit with the 7th year of Hoshea, the last king of Israel, places the start of Shalmaneser V's siege on Samaria between April and September 725 BCE.

=== Verse 10 ===
And at the end of three years they took it. In the sixth year of Hezekiah, that is, the ninth year of Hoshea king of Israel, Samaria was taken.

- "At the end of 3 years": according to Thiele-McFall chronology the siege on Samaria lasted from 725 to 723 BCE.
- "In the 4th year of King Hezekiah": according to Thiele-McFall chronology was in the period of his co-regency between Tishrei (September) 724 and Tishrei 723 BCE, and as "the 9th year of Hoshea" started in Nisan (April) 723 BCE, it means the fall of Samaria occurred between Nisan (April) and Tishrei (September) 723 BCE. Sargon II ascended the throne of Assyrian on 12 Tebet (end of December) 722 BCE, no less than 15 months after the last possible date of the fall of Samaria; so when it happened, Sargon was not a king, although he could have been the commander of the Assyrian army who took Samaria.
- "Samaria was taken": This event is also noted in one of the Babylonian Chronicles (ABC 1; "From Nabu-Nasir to Šamaš-šuma-ukin").

=== Verse 11 ===
Then the king of Assyria carried Israel away into exile to Assyria, and put them in Halah and on the Habor, the river of Gozan, and in the cities of the Medes,

=== Verse 12 ===
For they had refused to listen to the Lord their God or to do what he wanted them to do. Instead, they had transgressed his covenant and disobeyed all the laws given to them by Moses the servant of the Lord.

== The Assyrians attack and force tribute payment (18:13–16) ==
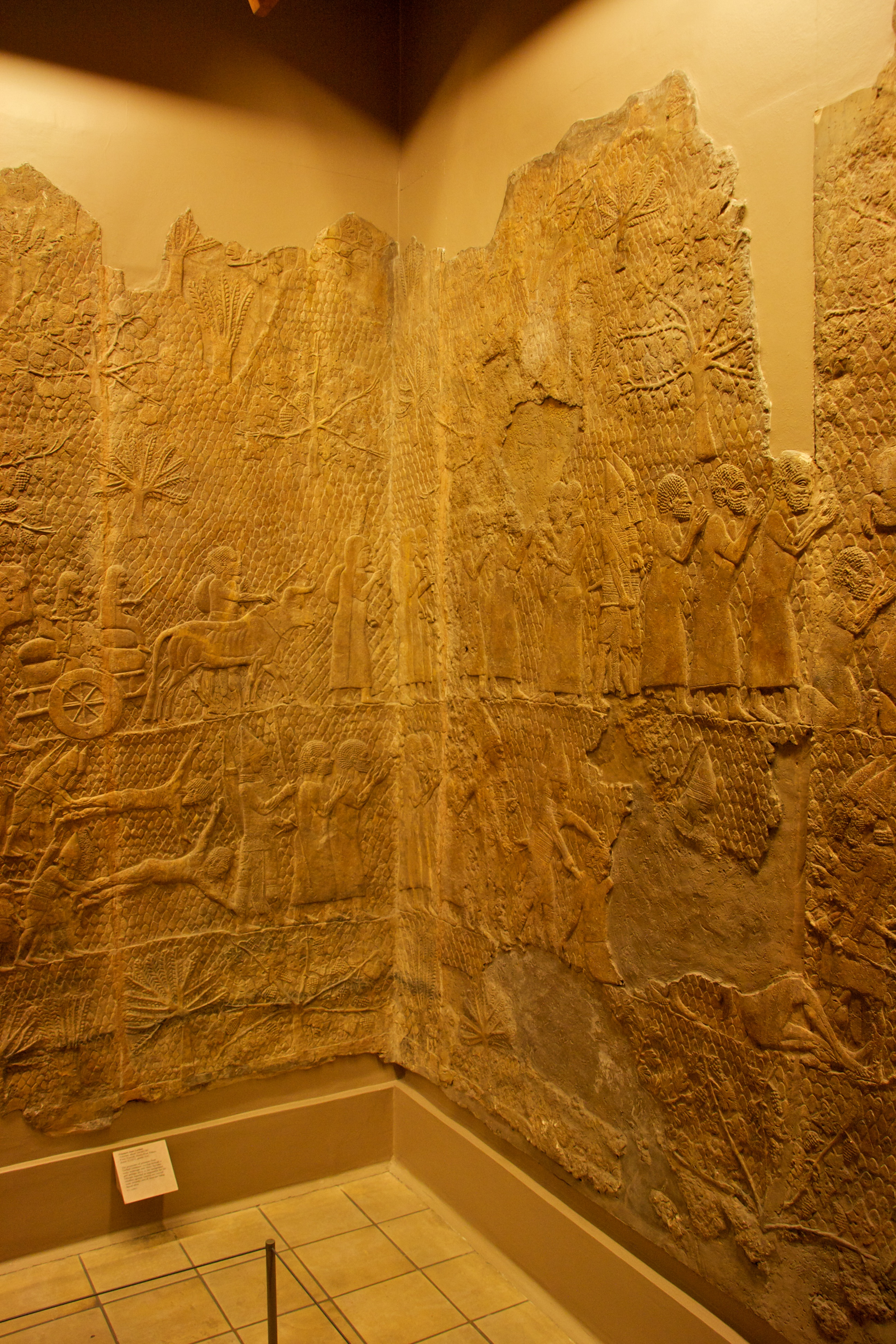
Lachish reliefs, British Museum

The Assyrians stormed Judah, likely in response to Hezekiah's rebellion (verse 7) in 701 BCE. In a short time many cities of Judah were occupied and Jerusalem was besieged. King Sennacherib depicted his victory over Lachish in a stone relief in his palace at Nineveh (Lachish reliefs, now in the British Museum) and described Hezekiah's desperate situation on several victory monuments (Sennacherib's Annals):

'As to Hezekiah, the Jew, he did not submit to my yoke, I laid siege to 46 of his strong cities... Himself I made a prisoner in Jerusalem, his royal residence, like a bird in a cage. I surrounded him with earthwork in order to molest those who were leaving his city's gate' (ANET 288).'

The Bible text records that Hezekiah initially tried to free himself from Assyrian pressure by conceding defeat and paying a heavy tribute, which also conforms with Sennacherib's record:

'Hezekiah... did send me, later, to Nineveh, my lordly city, together with 30 talents of gold, 800 talents of silver, precious stones ... [and] all kinds of valuable treasures, his [own] concubines, male and female musicians' (ANET 288).'

=== Verse 13 ===
And in the fourteenth year of King Hezekiah, Sennacherib king of Assyria came up against all the fortified cities of Judah and took them.

- "In the 14th year of King Hezekiah": according to Thiele-McFall chronology as sole ruler was between September 702 and September 701 BCE. in this period Hezekiah was also granted 15 years more to live (2 Kings 20:1–6; Isaiah 38:1–6).

== Rabshakeh's speeches (18:17–37) ==
Sennacherib decided that the tribute from Judah is not enough, so he sent his "big guns", his main officers, consisting of: 'Tartan, Rabsaris, and Rabshakeh' to force the capitulation of Jerusalem verse 17). The Assyrians started by using psychological warfare, with Rabshakeh speaking directly to the people of Jerusalem at the wall of the city using the Hebrew language and employing shrewd rhetoric on Israelite faith while undermining it.

The Rabshakeh is not a common messenger, as he is a 'propagandist and skill negotiator' with the ability of speaking the 'language of diplomatic disputation', with a purpose to divide the people of Judah along calls lines (verse 27). The envoy delivered two speeches: one directed to King Hezekiah and his officers/negotiators, including Shebna and Eliakim, (verses 19–25) and one to 'the (warring) people on the city walls' (verses 27–35). Rabshakeh's well-crafted speeches alternate between promises of good things from the Assyrian king and warnings not to trust YHWH nor Hezekiah to protect them:

A do not trust Egypt (18:19–21)

B do not trust YHWH nor Hezekiah (18:22)

A' king of Assyria will give chariots and horses (Egypt will not do that) (18:23–25)

B' do not trust Hezekiah nor YHWH (18:29–30)

A" king of Assyrian will take them to a promised land (18:31–31)

B" YHWH cannot protect, any more than other gods (18:33–35)

He states four seemingly excellent arguments for capitulation:

1. Reliance on Egypt is foolish and dangerous, as already shown in history (verse 21)
2. Reliance on God is unwise as Hezekiah has removed God's holy places (verse 22)
3. Reliance on Judah's military power would be ridiculous (verses 23–24)
4. Assyrians are the agents of God, charged with the mission to destroy Judah (verse 25)

Rabshakeh hammers on the issue of trust, which is a key issue in 2 Kings 17, as spoken by the prophets, but here he offers the theological challenge: Hezekiah's acts of destroying places of worship provoke the displeasure of YHWH, and the implication: neither Hezekiah nor Egypt nor YHWH can be trusted to deliver the people. He ends his speech with an audacious claim that Sennacherib, not Hezekiah, is doing the will of God (verse 25) and that the Assyrian king will be the shepherd-king for Israel, a composite of Moses, Joshua and Solomon, to bring the people to a land full of prosperity (verse 32). Brueggemann observes a structure in the speech mocking YHWH's power to emphasize that 'YHWH is only one among many gods':

A will Yahweh deliver?

B has any god delivered?

C gods of Hamath and Arpad, etc.

B' what gods have delivered?

A' can Yahweh deliver?

Rabshakeh's argument rises from the polytheistic worship system of the empire with the boast that Assyria has the king 'before whom no gods can stand'. This leads to the confrontation and the display of YHWH's power in chapter 19.

=== Verse 17 ===
And the king of Assyria sent Tartan and Rabsaris and Rabshakeh from Lachish to king Hezekiah with a great host against Jerusalem. And they went up and came to Jerusalem. And when they were come up, they came and stood by the conduit of the upper pool, which is in the highway of the fuller's field.

- "Tartan": an Assyrian title, probably "commander in chief"; or "second in rank"; an army commander ranked next to the king. There seem to be various offices of Tartan, such as tartanu imni or 'tartan of the right', as well as a tartanu shumeli or 'tartan of the left', and later times the title became territorial, such as a tartan of 'Kummuh' (Commagene), or can also be applied to the commanders of foreign armies, such as Sargon speaking of the Tartan Musurai, or 'Egyptian Tartan'. Sargon II, the king of Assyria before Sennacherib, sends a Tartan who takes Ashdod during the reign of King Hezekiah at the time of the prophet Isaiah (Isaiah 20:1).
- "Rabsaris": an Assyrian title, probably "chief officer"; "chief of staff"; "commander in chief."
- "Rabshakeh": an Assyrian title, probably "chief of staff" or "governor"; "commanding general"; or "chief buttler", in charge of king's affair; "the king's person."

== Extra biblical documentation ==
=== Ahaz ===
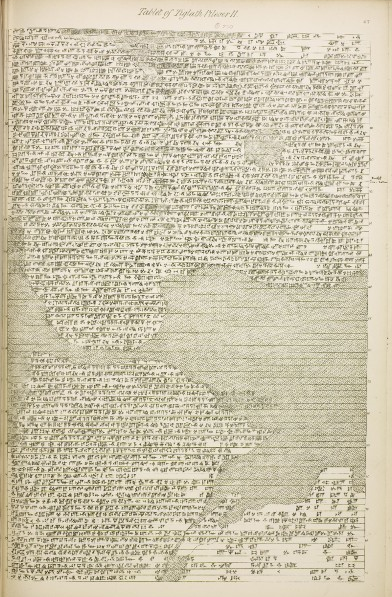
The text of Nimrud Tablet K.3751 in Sir Henry Rawlinson's Editio princeps, which contains the name of "Ahaz (written as "Jeho-ahaz") of Judah".

Other than in the Books of Kings, Ahaz is mentioned in the Book of Isaiah, Books of Chronicles, Gospel of Matthew (1:9), and Assyrian inscriptions (ANET 282–284), such as the " Nimrud Tablet K.3751", which is the first ancient record for the name "Judah" (Yaudaya or KUR.ia-ú-da-a-a) and "Ahaz" (written as "Jeho-ahaz").

Several bullae with the printed name of Ahaz have been found:

1. a royal bulla with the inscription: “Belonging to Ahaz (son of) Jehotam, King of Judah.”
2. stone seal in scarab beetle shape with the inscription: "Belonging to Ushna servant of Ahaz"
3. a royal bulla with the inscription: "Belonging to Hezekiah [son of] Ahaz king of Judah" (between 727 and 698 BCE).

=== Hezekiah ===
Stamped bulla sealed by a servant of King Hezekiah, formerly pressed against a cord; unprovenanced Redondo Beach collection of antiquities

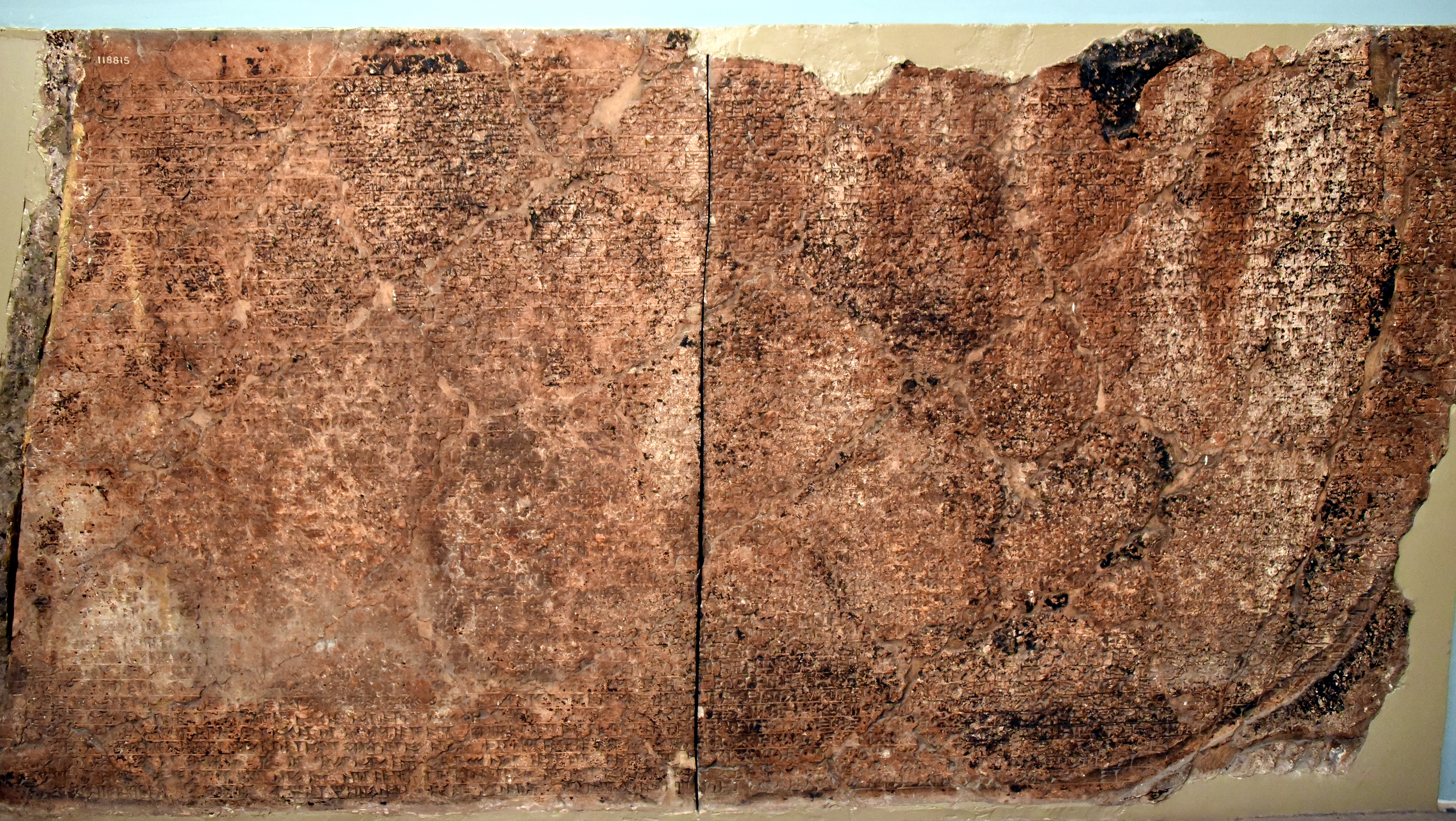
Cuneiform Inscription mentioning in detail the tribute sent by Hezekiah, king of Judah, to Sennacherib. The British Museum

Extra-biblical sources specify Hezekiah by name, along with his reign and influence. "Historiographically, his reign is noteworthy for the convergence of a variety of biblical sources and diverse extrabiblical evidence often bearing on the same events. Significant data concerning Hezekiah appear in the Deuteronomistic History, the Chronicler, Isaiah, Assyrian annals and reliefs, Israelite epigraphy, and, increasingly, stratigraphy". Archaeologist Amihai Mazar considers the tensions between Assyria and Judah "one of the best-documented events of the Iron Age" and "Hezekiah's story is one of the best to cross-reference with the rest of the Mid Eastern world's historical documents".

Several bullae bearing the name of Hezekiah have been found:

1. a royal bulla with the inscription in ancient Hebrew script: "Belonging to Hezekiah [son of] Ahaz king of Judah" (between 727 and 698 BCE).
2. seals with the inscription: "Belonging to [the] servant of Hezekiah"

Other artifacts bearing the name "Hezekiah" include LMLK stored jars along the border with Assyria "demonstrate careful preparations to counter Sennacherib's likely route of invasion" and show "a notable degree of royal control of towns and cities which would facilitate Hezekiah's destruction of rural sacrificial sites and his centralization of worship in Jerusalem", with the evidence suggesting the use throughout Hezekiah's reign, and the Siloam inscription.

=== Shebna ===
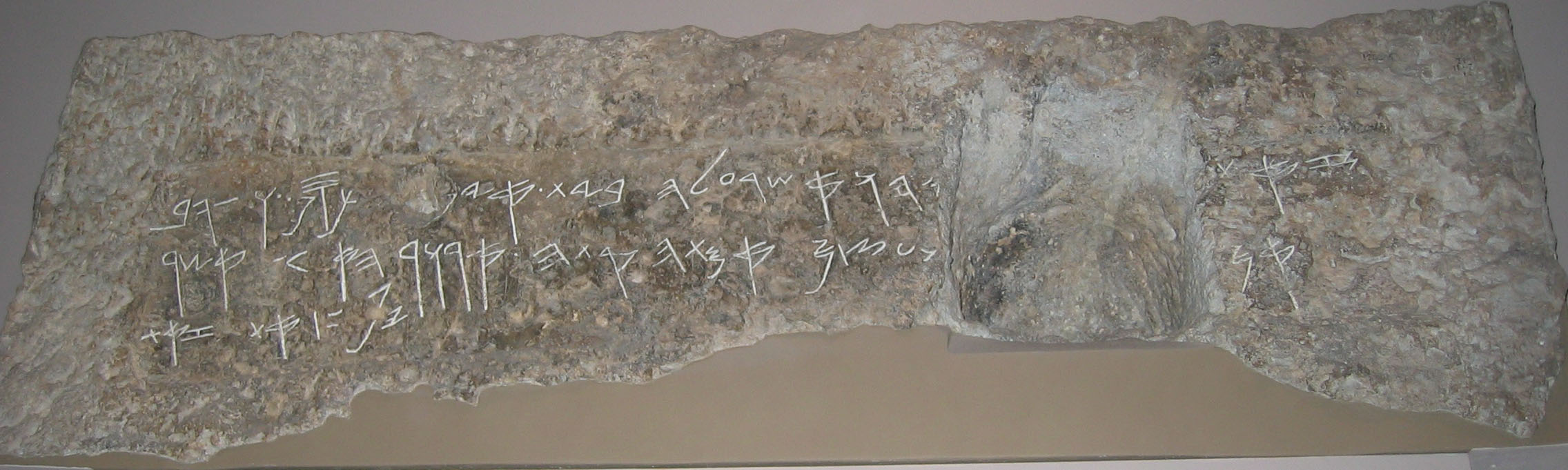
"Shebna inscription" on the lintel of the tomb of "Sebna-yahu", now in British Museum

An inscription bearing the name "Shebnayahu" was discovered on the lintel above the entrance of a rock-cut tomb which suggests the connection to Shebna, the court officer mentioned in 2 Kings 18:18 and 2 Kings 19:2.

=== Sennacherib ===
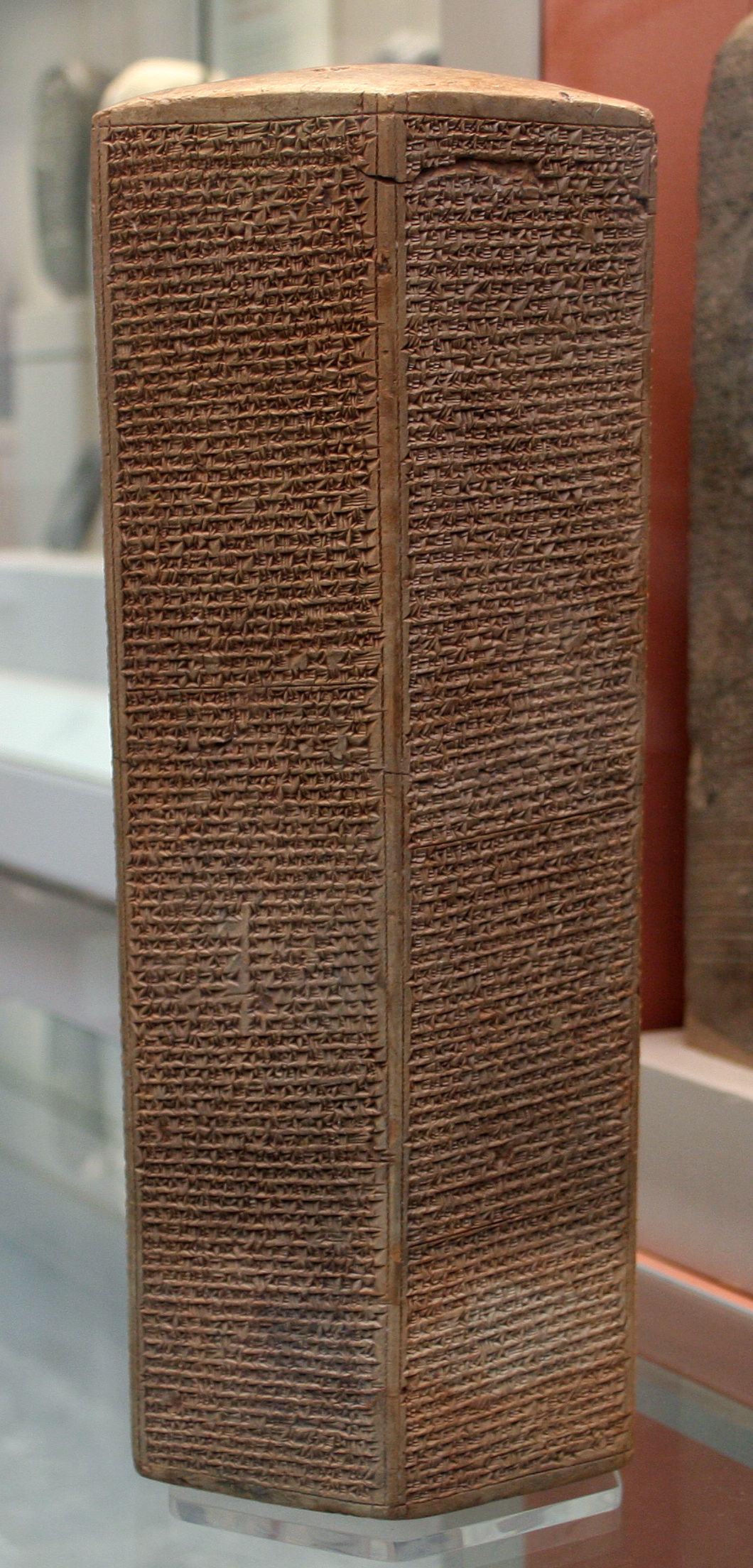
Taylor Prism, London

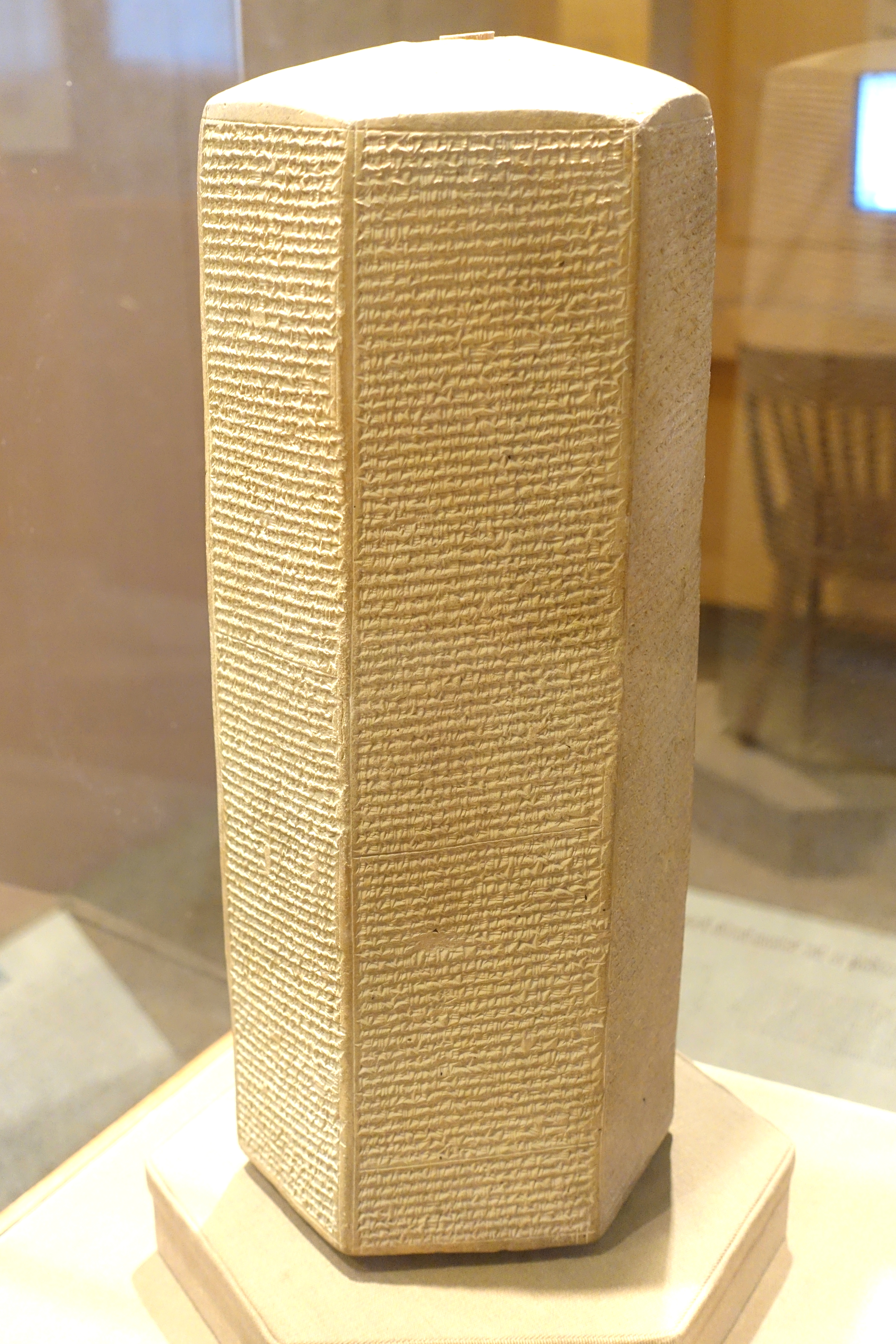
Oriental Institute Prism, Chicago

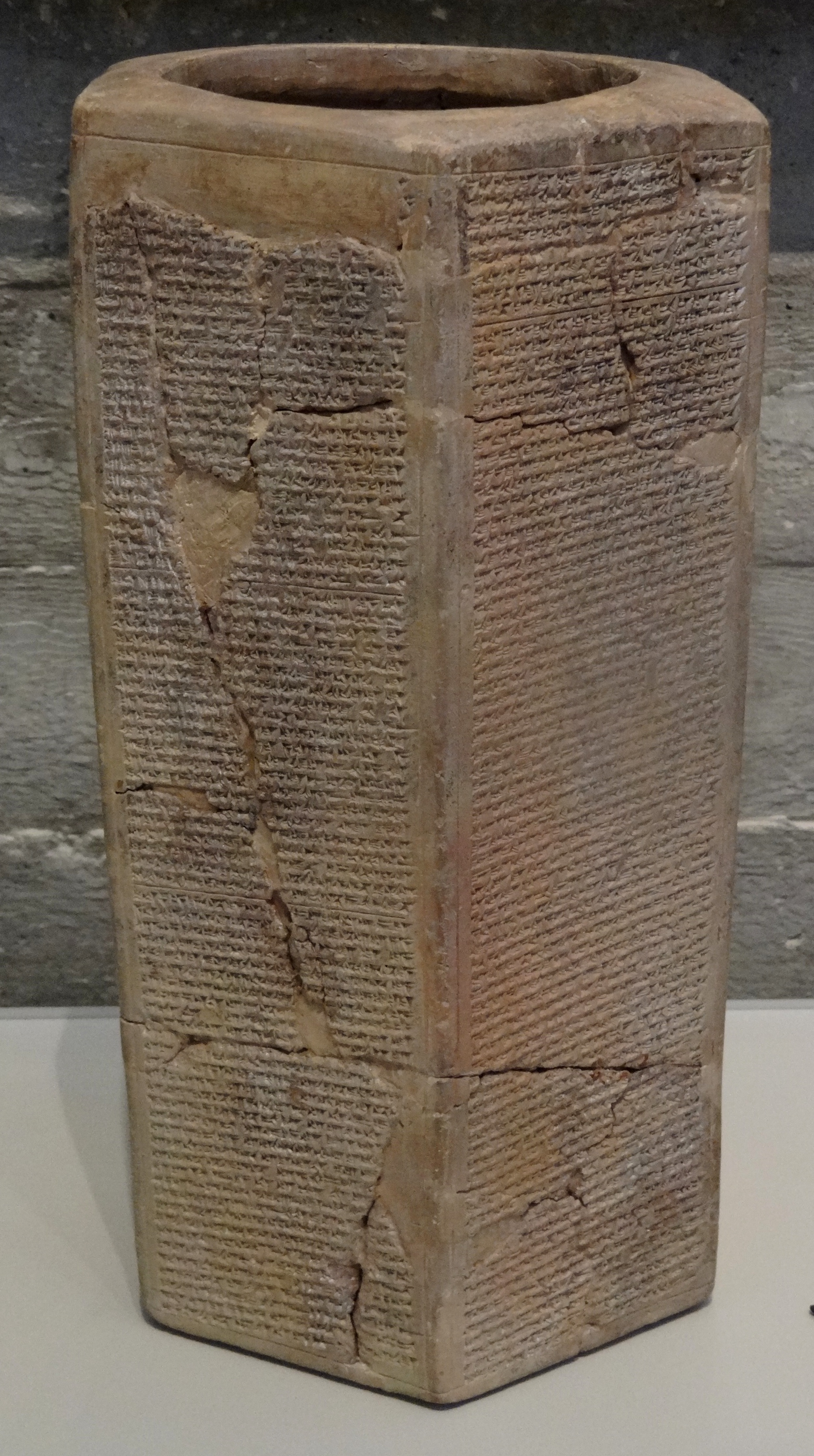
Jerusalem Prism, Israel

Sennacherib's Annals of his military campaign (704–681 BCE), including his invasion into the Kingdom of Judah

The accounts of Sennacherib of Assyria, including his invasion into the Kingdom of Judah, especially the capture of Lachish and the siege of Jerusalem, are recorded in a number of ancient documents and artifacts:

- Lachish reliefs from his palace in Nineveh
- Prisms containing the annals of the Assyrians (Sennacherib's Annals)
- Traces of Assyrian siege around the location of ancient Lachish.and the uncovered walls near the Tel Lachish digs, which fit the descriptions shown in the Lachish reliefs.

== Illustration ==
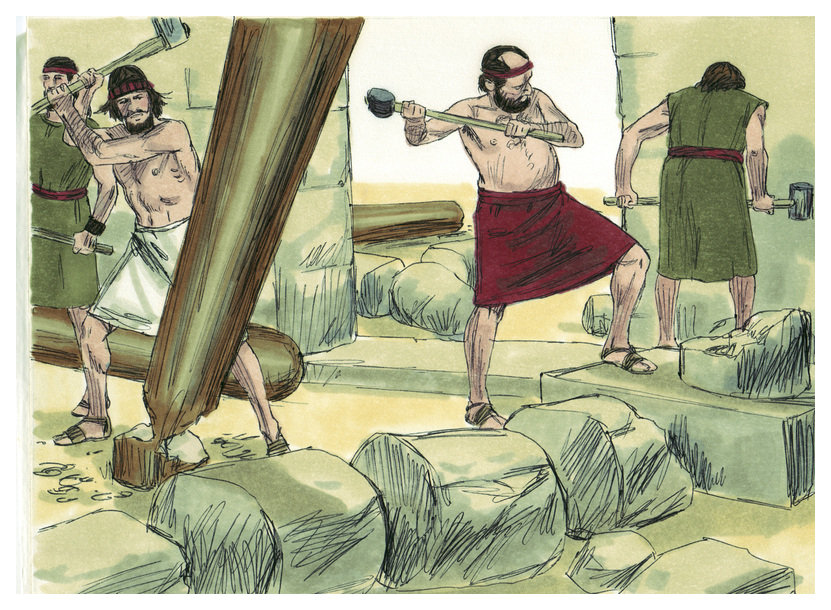
Hezekiah ordered the destruction of idol worship places

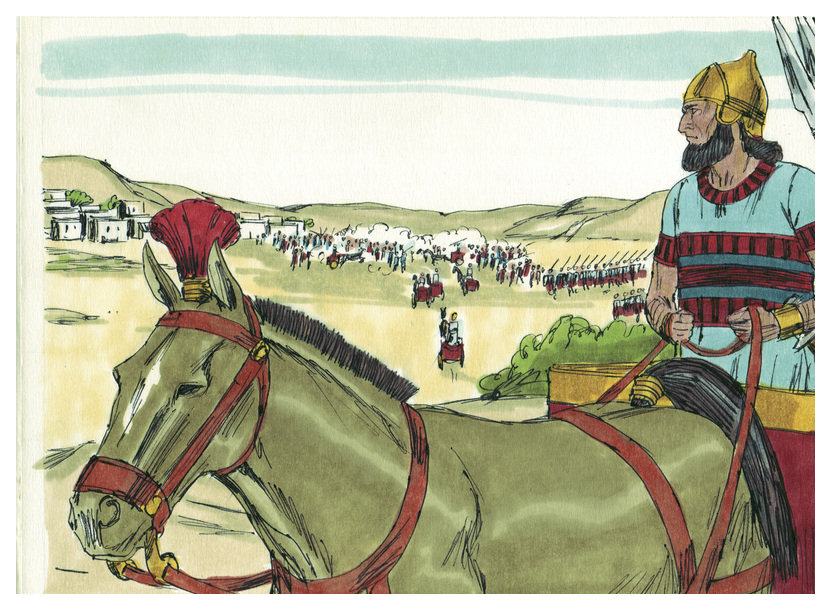
Sennacherib invaded Judah

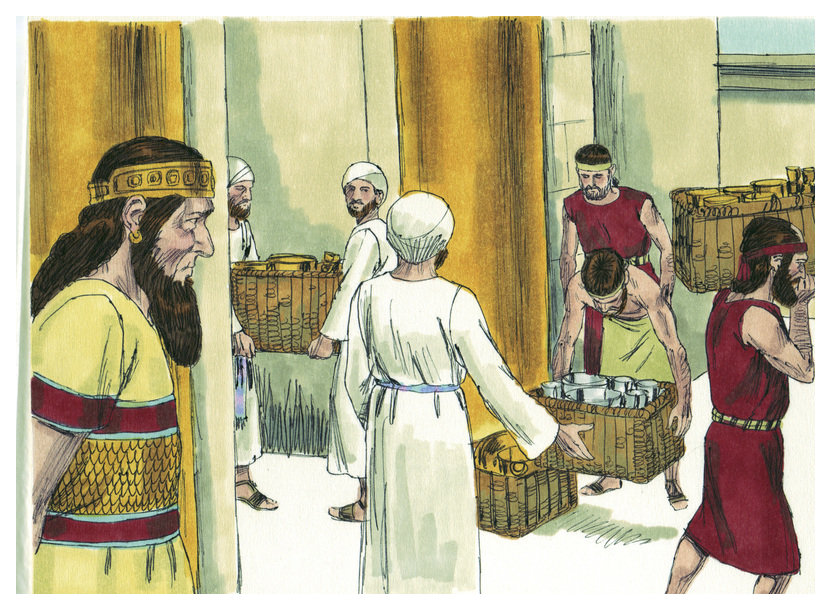
Hezekiah sent tributes to Sennacherib

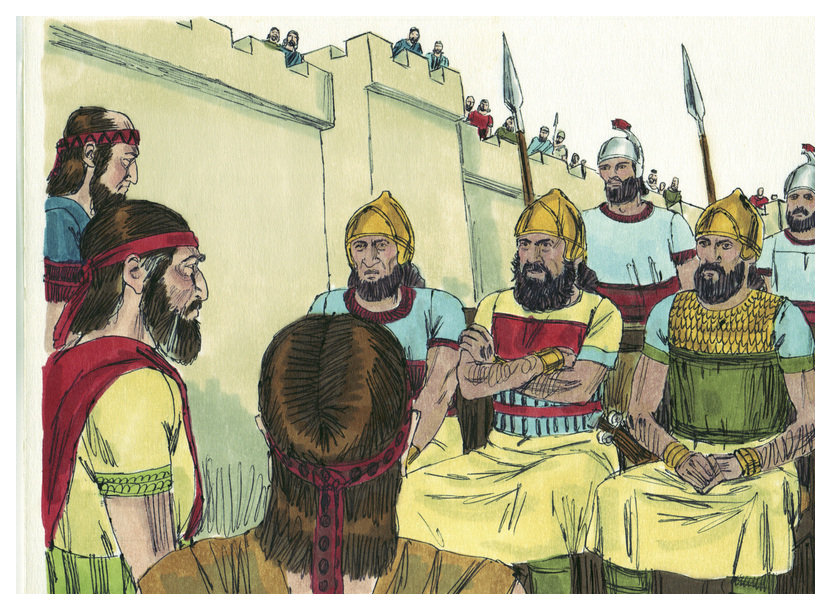
Hezekiah's court officials met Assyrian officers

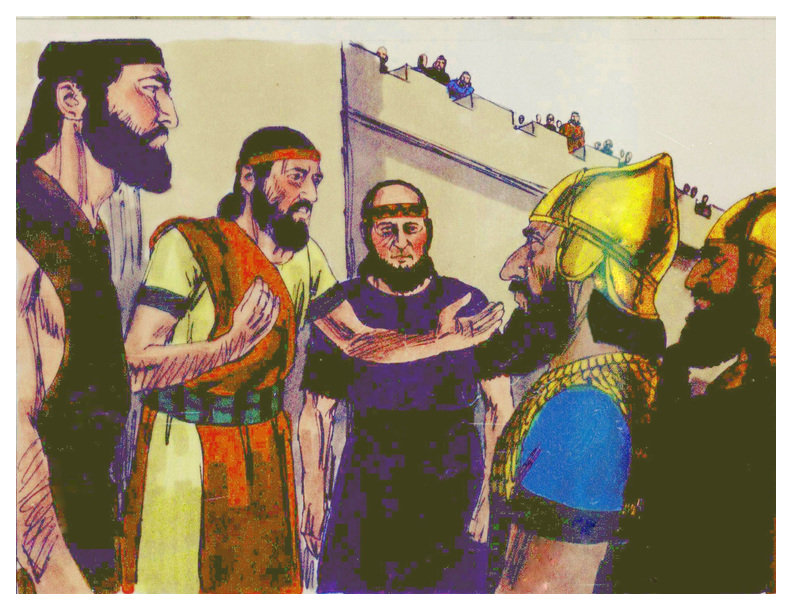
Hezekiah's court officials talked to the Assyrian officers

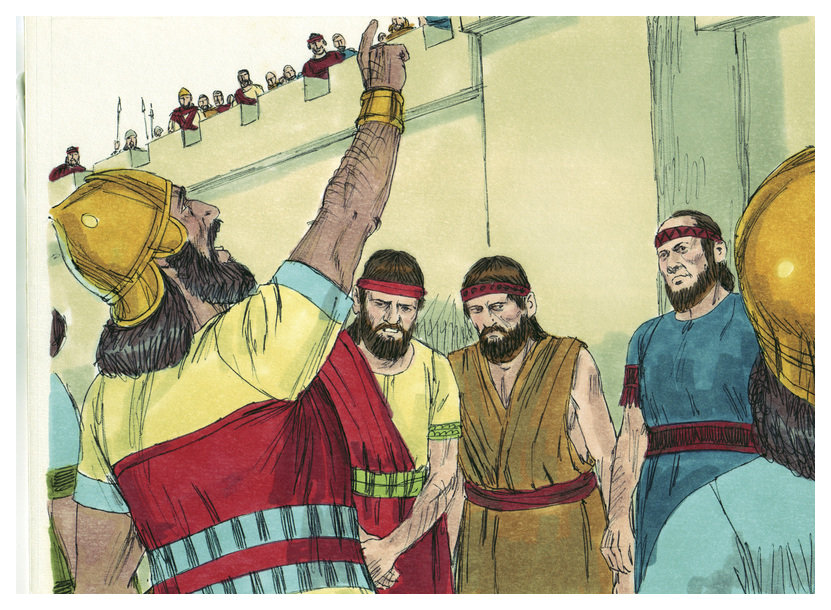
The Rabshakeh mocked God

== See also ==
- Assyrian captivity
- Assyrian siege of Jerusalem
- Jerusalem
- Kingdom of Judah
- King Ahaz's seal
- King Hezekiah bulla
- Lachish
- Lachish reliefs
- Neo-Assyrian
- Resettlement policy of the Neo-Assyrian Empire
- Samaria
- Siege of Lachish
- Related Bible parts: 2 Kings 17, 2 Kings 19, 2 Kings 20, 2 Chronicles 29, 2 Chronicles 32, Isaiah 36, Isaiah 37, Jeremiah 39

== Sources ==
- Cogan, Mordechai; Tadmor, Hayim (1988). II Kings: A New Translation. Anchor Yale Bible Commentaries. Vol. 11. Doubleday. ISBN 9780385023887.
- Collins, John J. (2014). "Chapter 14: 1 Kings 12 – 2 Kings 25". Introduction to the Hebrew Scriptures. Fortress Press. pp. 277–296. ISBN 9781451469233.
- Coogan, Michael David (2007). Coogan, Michael David; Brettler, Marc Zvi; Newsom, Carol Ann; Perkins, Pheme (eds.). The New Oxford Annotated Bible with the Apocryphal/Deuterocanonical Books: New Revised Standard Version, Issue 48 (Augmented 3rd ed.). Oxford University Press. ISBN 9780195288810.
- Dietrich, Walter (2007). "13. 1 and 2 Kings". In Barton, John; Muddiman, John (eds.). The Oxford Bible Commentary (first (paperback) ed.). Oxford University Press. pp. 232–266. ISBN 978-0199277186.
- Fretheim, Terence E (1997). First and Second Kings. Westminster John Knox Press. ISBN 978-0-664-25565-7.
- Halley, Henry H. (1965). Halley's Bible Handbook: an abbreviated Bible commentary (24th (revised) ed.). Zondervan Publishing House. ISBN 0-310-25720-4.
- Leithart, Peter J. (2006). 1 & 2 Kings. Brazos Theological Commentary on the Bible. Brazos Press. ISBN 978-1587431258.
- McFall, Leslie (1991), "Translation Guide to the Chronological Data in Kings and Chronicles" (PDF), Bibliotheca Sacra, 148: 3–45, archived from the original (PDF) on August 27, 2010
- McKane, William (1993). "Kings, Book of". In Metzger, Bruce M; Coogan, Michael D (eds.). The Oxford Companion to the Bible. Oxford University Press. pp. 409–413. ISBN 978-0195046458.
- Nelson, Richard Donald (1987). First and Second Kings. Westminster John Knox Press. ISBN 978-0-664-22084-6.
- Pritchard, James B (1969). Ancient Near Eastern texts relating to the Old Testament (3 ed.). Princeton University Press. ISBN 9780691035031.
- Sweeney, Marvin (2007). I & II Kings: A Commentary. Westminster John Knox Press. ISBN 978-0-664-22084-6.
- Thiele, Edwin R. (1983). The Mysterious Numbers of the Hebrew Kings (3rd ed.). Grand Rapids, Michigan: Zondervan. ISBN 978-0-310-36010-0.
- Würthwein, Ernst (1995). The Text of the Old Testament. Translated by Rhodes, Erroll F. Grand Rapids, MI: Wm. B. Eerdmans. ISBN 0-8028-0788-7.
