= 2 Kings 13 =

2 Kings, chapter 13

- ← chapter 12 chapter 14 →
- The pages containing the Books of Kings (1 & 2 Kings) Leningrad Codex (1008 CE).
- Book: Second Book of Kings
- Hebrew Bible part: Nevi'im
- Order in the Hebrew part: 4
- Category: Former Prophets
- Christian Bible part: Old Testament
- Order in the Christian part: 12

2 Kings 13 is the thirteenth chapter of the second part of the Books of Kings in the Hebrew Bible or the Second Book of Kings in the Old Testament of the Christian Bible. The book is a compilation of various annals recording the acts of the kings of Israel and Judah by a Deuteronomic compiler in the seventh century BCE, with a supplement added in the sixth century BCE. This chapter records the reigns of Jehu's son, Jehoahaz, and Jehu's grandson, Jehoash, in the kingdom of Israel during the reign of Jehoash, the king of Judah, as well as the events around the death of Elisha. The narrative is a part of a major section 2 Kings 9:1–15:12 covering the period of Jehu's dynasty.

== Text ==
This chapter was originally written in the Hebrew language and since the 16th century is divided into 25 verses.

=== Textual witnesses ===
Some early manuscripts containing the text of this chapter in Hebrew are of the Masoretic Text tradition, which includes the Codex Cairensis (895), Aleppo Codex (10th century), and Codex Leningradensis (1008).

There is also a translation into Koine Greek known as the Septuagint, made in the last few centuries BCE. Extant ancient manuscripts of the Septuagint version include Codex Vaticanus (B; $\mathfrak{G}$^{B}; 4th century) and Codex Alexandrinus (A; $\mathfrak{G}$^{A}; 5th century). (Note: The whole book of 2 Kings is missing from the extant Codex Sinaiticus.)

== Analysis ==
This chapter contains an underlying typology of the Exodus and Conquest, linking also to passages in the Book of Judges with the recurring pattern: worship of idols provoking the jealousy and anger of YHWH, then Israel is delivered into the hands of foreign nations, until the people cry for help, so YHWH sends a savior to deliver them, returning them to true worship until the savior (or 'judge') dies and the cycle starts again (Judges 2:6–23). This pattern is 'grounded in the foundational exodus pattern': YHWH responds to the cry of the people, remembers their covenant with him, raises Moses as a savior and delivers Israel from Egypt.

== Jehoahaz, king of Israel (13:1–9) ==
Jehu's son Jehoahaz became the king of Israel during the long reign of Joash, the king of Judah. This is a period of a relatively long and internally stable dynasty, but starkly in contrast to problems from abroad, as Aram-Damascus became the superpower in the region, with bitter consequences for Israel (cf. verse 7). The oppression of the Syrian kings, Hazael and his son Ben-hadad is seen as the result of God's anger on Israel's faithlessness, more specifically, 'the sins of Jeroboam' (cf. verses 2–3 with Judges 2:13–14; 3:7–8, 11–12; 4:1–2, etc.). Like Israel at the time of the judges, Jehoahaz asked God for help and was provided a 'savior' (verses 4–6). However, Israel kept adhered to 'the sins of Jeroboam' and additionally worshipped Asherah in Samaria.

=== Verse 1 ===
In the twenty-third year of Joash the son of Ahaziah, king of Judah, Jehoahaz the son of Jehu began to reign over Israel in Samaria, and he reigned seventeen years.

- "In the 23rd year of Joash the son of Ahaziah": According to Thiele's chronology, following "non-accession year method", Jehoahaz the son of Jehu became the king of Israel starting between September 814 BCE and April 813 BCE until his death between September 798 BCE and April 797 BCE.
- "Joash": this name is spelled as "Jehoash" in 2 Kings 12:1–18.

== Jehoash, king of Israel, and the death of Elisha (13:10-25) ==
The passage about Jehoahaz' son, Jehoash, the king of Israel (his name is spelt 'Joash' in 13:12, and 14:1) is unusually structured:

- the introductory formula (verse 10)
- the rating as king (verse 11)
- the (early) concluding formula (verse 12).

The following passages are still related to Jehoash with the concluding formula repeated in 2 Kings 14:15–16. This peculiarity could be a result of the insertion of two Elisha legends (verses 14–19 and 20–21) into the narrative context using verses 12–13 and 22–25. The first legend shows Elisha acting as military support against the Arameans (cf. 2 Kings 6–7). Jehoash held the prophet Elisha in honor, and wept by his bedside while he was dying, addressing him in the words Elisha himself had used when Elijah was carried up into heaven (2 Kings 2:12): "O my father, my father, the chariot of Israel and the horsemen thereof" (2 Kings 13:14; 2 Kings 14), During the visit, Elisha had Jehoash perform certain prophetic tasks. The king did not know what he was doing, and was only given explanation after the deed. The arrow shot to the east is an indication of future victory against Aram, significantly shows ‘how far south the Arameans had advanced’ into the territory of Israel in the eastbank (cf. 2 Kings 10:32–33) and the point from where they are to be pushed back. The use of obscure sign language in the prophecies is found in other books of prophets (e.g. Isaiah 8:1–4; 20; Jeremiah 27–28; Ezekiel 4–5; 12, amongst others). The prophecy was fulfilled with successive victories of Jehoash over the Syrians, enabling him to retake from them the towns which Hazael had captured from Israel.

The attack by a band of Moabites in the second short legend indicates that the northern kingdom was so severely weakened after Jehu's coup that not only the Arameans, but other neighboring tribes also took advantage of the situation. The hasty burial of a body in Elisha's grave (probably a burial cave) results in a resurrection, which displays Elisha's miraculous death-defying powers even beyond his own death, just as during his lifetime (2 Kings 13:20–21).

Verses 22–25 clarify that the story fits Jehoash, not Jehoahaz, because Jehoahaz suffered lifelong pressure from Hazael and Ben-hadad (13:3), whereas Jehoash did not (cf. 13:10–12; 14:15–16).

=== Verse 10 ===
In the thirty-seventh year of Joash king of Judah, Jehoash the son of Jehoahaz began to reign over Israel in Samaria, and he reigned sixteen years.

- "'In the 37th year of Joash king of Judah": according to Thiele's chronology, following the "non-accession year method", Jehoash the son of Jehoahaz became the co-regent on the throne of Israel with his father in April 799 BCE then reign alone after his father's death starting between September 798 BCE and April 797 BCE until his death between September 782 BCE and April 781 BCE. He died soon after the battle against Amaziah the king of Judah and was buried in Samaria.
- "Jehoash (the son of Jehoahaz)" (Hebrew: יהואש Yəhō’āš): is an alternate spelling of "Joash" (יואש Yō’āš; Latin: Joas) in verses 9, 12–14; also verse 25. The name means “Yahweh has given”.

== Archeology ==
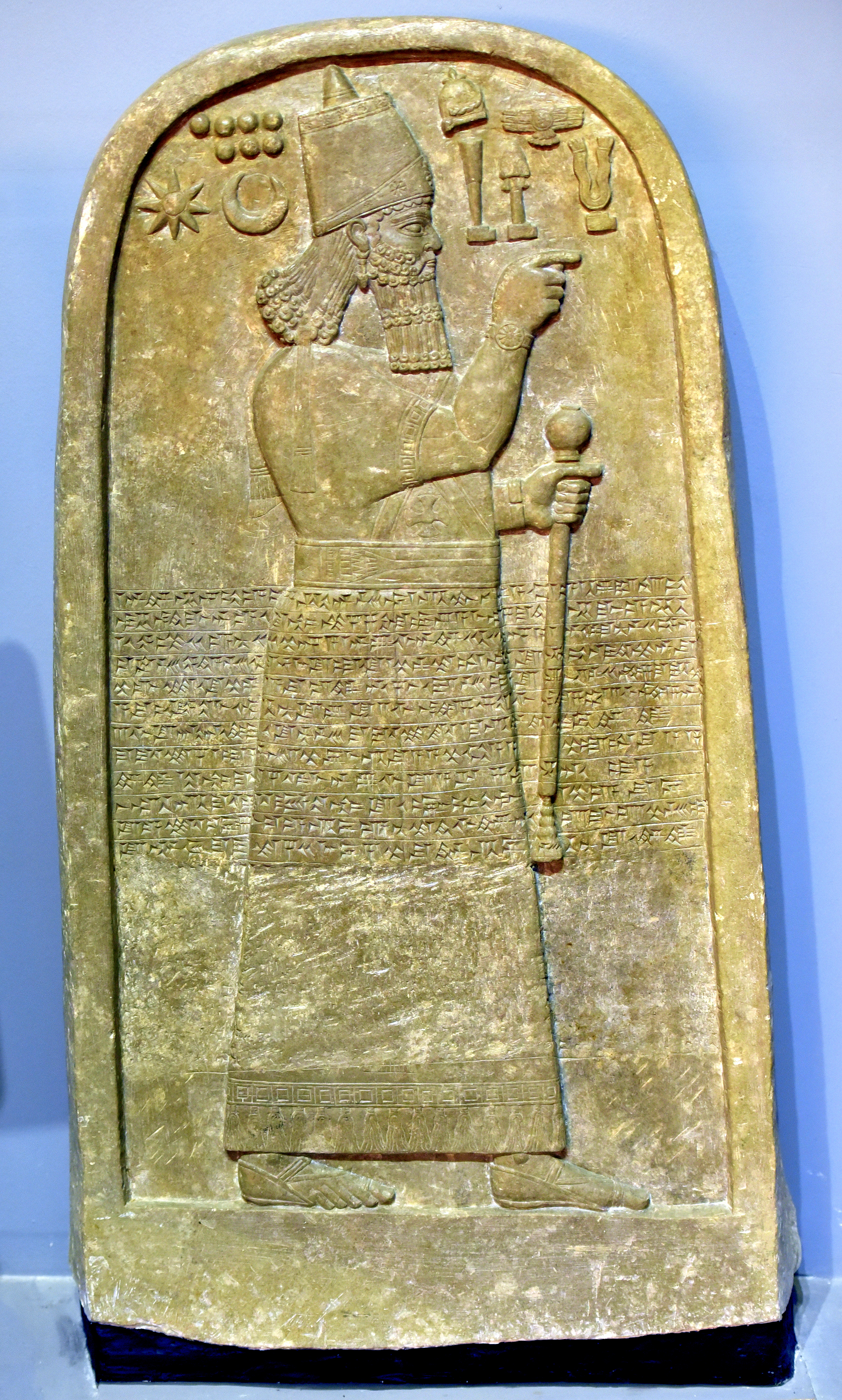
Stele of Adad-nirari III from Tell al-Rimah, now in the Iraq Museum, mentions the name of Jehoash the Samarian

The excavation at Tell al-Rimah yields a stele of Adad-nirari III which mentioned "Jehoash the Samarian" and contains the first cuneiform mention of Samaria by that name. The inscriptions of this "Tell al-Rimah Stele" may provide evidence of the existence of King Jehoash, attest to the weakening of Syrian kingdom (cf. 2 Kings 13:5), and show the vassal status of the northern kingdom of Israel to the Assyrians.

A postulated image of Jehoash is reconstructed from plaster remains recovered at Kuntillet Ajrud. The ruins were from a temple built by the northern Israel kingdom when Jehoash of Israel gained control over the kingdom of Judah during the reign of Amaziah of Judah.

== See also ==
- Aram-Damascus
- Graves Into Gardens
- Samaria
- Related Bible parts:2 Kings 9, Hosea 1

== Sources ==
- Cohn, Robert L. (2000). Cotter, David W.; Walsh, Jerome T.; Franke, Chris (eds.). 2 Kings. Berit Olam (The Everlasting Covenant): Studies In Hebrew Narrative And Poetry. Liturgical Press. ISBN 9780814650547.
- Collins, John J. (2014). "Chapter 14: 1 Kings 12 – 2 Kings 25". Introduction to the Hebrew Scriptures. Fortress Press. pp. 277–296. ISBN 9781451469233.
- Coogan, Michael David (2007). Coogan, Michael David; Brettler, Marc Zvi; Newsom, Carol Ann; Perkins, Pheme (eds.). The New Oxford Annotated Bible with the Apocryphal/Deuterocanonical Books: New Revised Standard Version, Issue 48 (Augmented 3rd ed.). Oxford University Press. ISBN 9780195288810.
- Dietrich, Walter (2007). "13. 1 and 2 Kings". In Barton, John; Muddiman, John (eds.). The Oxford Bible Commentary (first (paperback) ed.). Oxford University Press. pp. 232–266. ISBN 978-0199277186.
- Halley, Henry H. (1965). Halley's Bible Handbook: an abbreviated Bible commentary (24th (revised) ed.). Zondervan Publishing House. ISBN 0-310-25720-4.
- Leithart, Peter J. (2006). 1 & 2 Kings. Brazos Theological Commentary on the Bible. Brazos Press. ISBN 978-1587431258.
- McFall, Leslie (1991), "Translation Guide to the Chronological Data in Kings and Chronicles" (PDF), Bibliotheca Sacra, 148: 3–45, archived from the original (PDF) on 2010-08-27
- McKane, William (1993). "Kings, Book of". In Metzger, Bruce M; Coogan, Michael D (eds.). The Oxford Companion to the Bible. Oxford University Press. pp. 409–413. ISBN 978-0195046458.
- Würthwein, Ernst (1995). The Text of the Old Testament. Translated by Rhodes, Erroll F. Grand Rapids, MI: Wm. B. Eerdmans. ISBN 0-8028-0788-7.
