= Sargon II's Prisms =

Sargon II's Prism A
- Material: Clay
- Size: 6.4 x 4.4 cm
- Writing: Akkadian cuneiform
- Created: c.710 BC
- Discovered: Mid 19th century. Combined identification in [1903]
- Present location: British Museum

Sargon II's Prisms are two Assyrian tablet inscriptions describing Sargon II's (722 to 705 BC) campaigns, discovered in Nineveh in the Library of Ashurbanipal. The Prisms today are in the British Museum.

An excerpt of the text as translated by Luckenbill as below:

"... Philistia, Judah, Edom, Moab ...".

== Known fragments ==
=== Prism A ===
- K. 1668b + DT6: four columns, with 15, 42, 48 and 19 lines
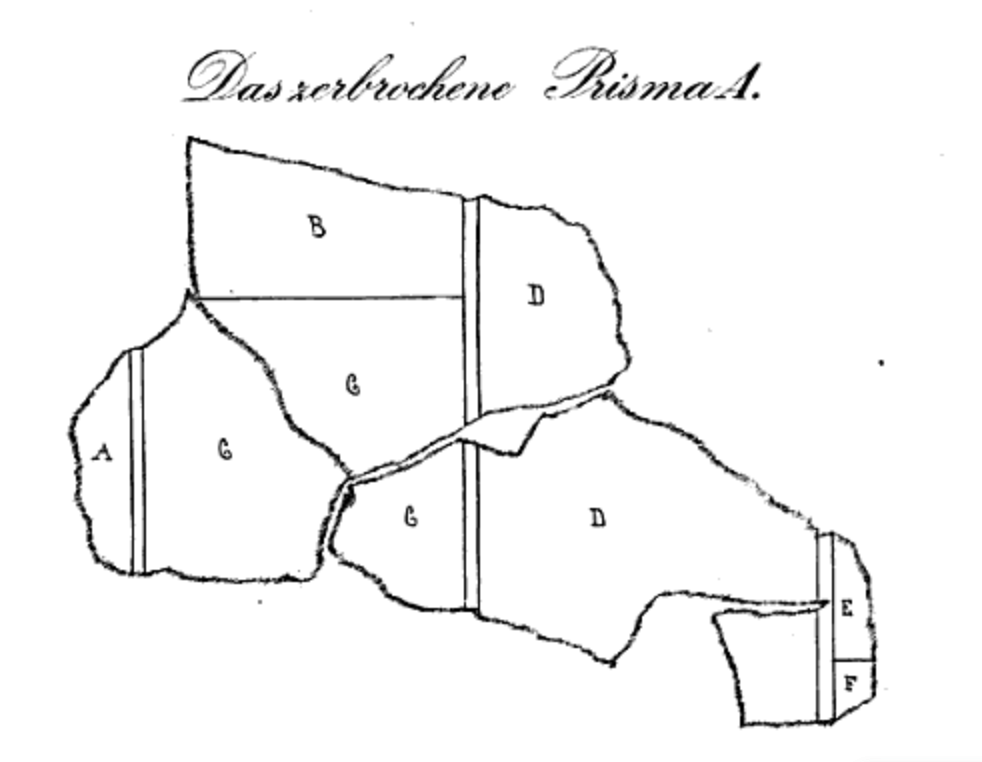
Diagram for the reconstruction of Prism A

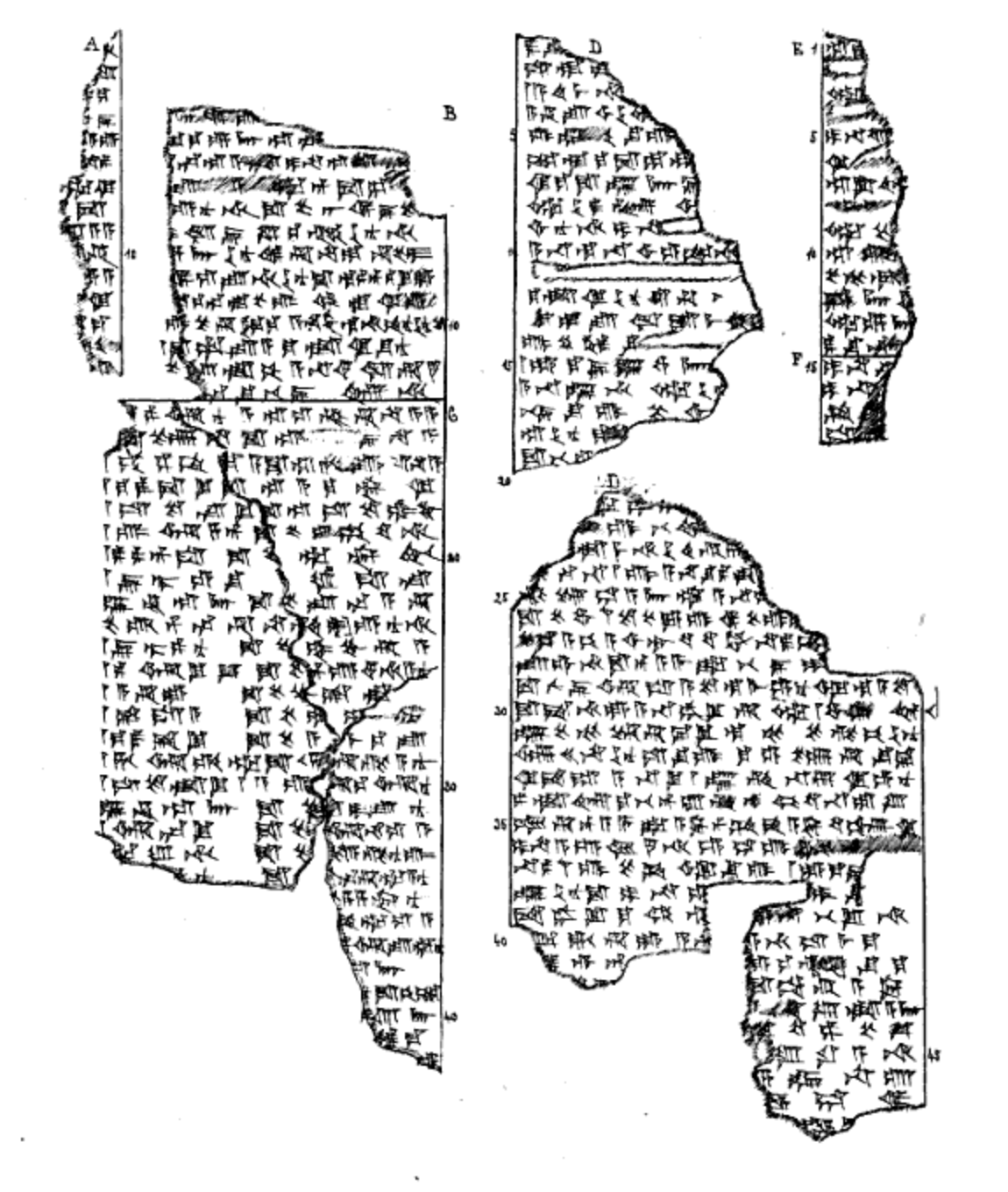
Prism A fragments

=== Prism B fragments ===
- (A) K. 1668a + K. 1671: two columns, with 64 and 63 lines
- (B) K. 1672: two columns, with 9 and 8 lines
- (H) K. 1669: one column, 34 lines, in 2 sections
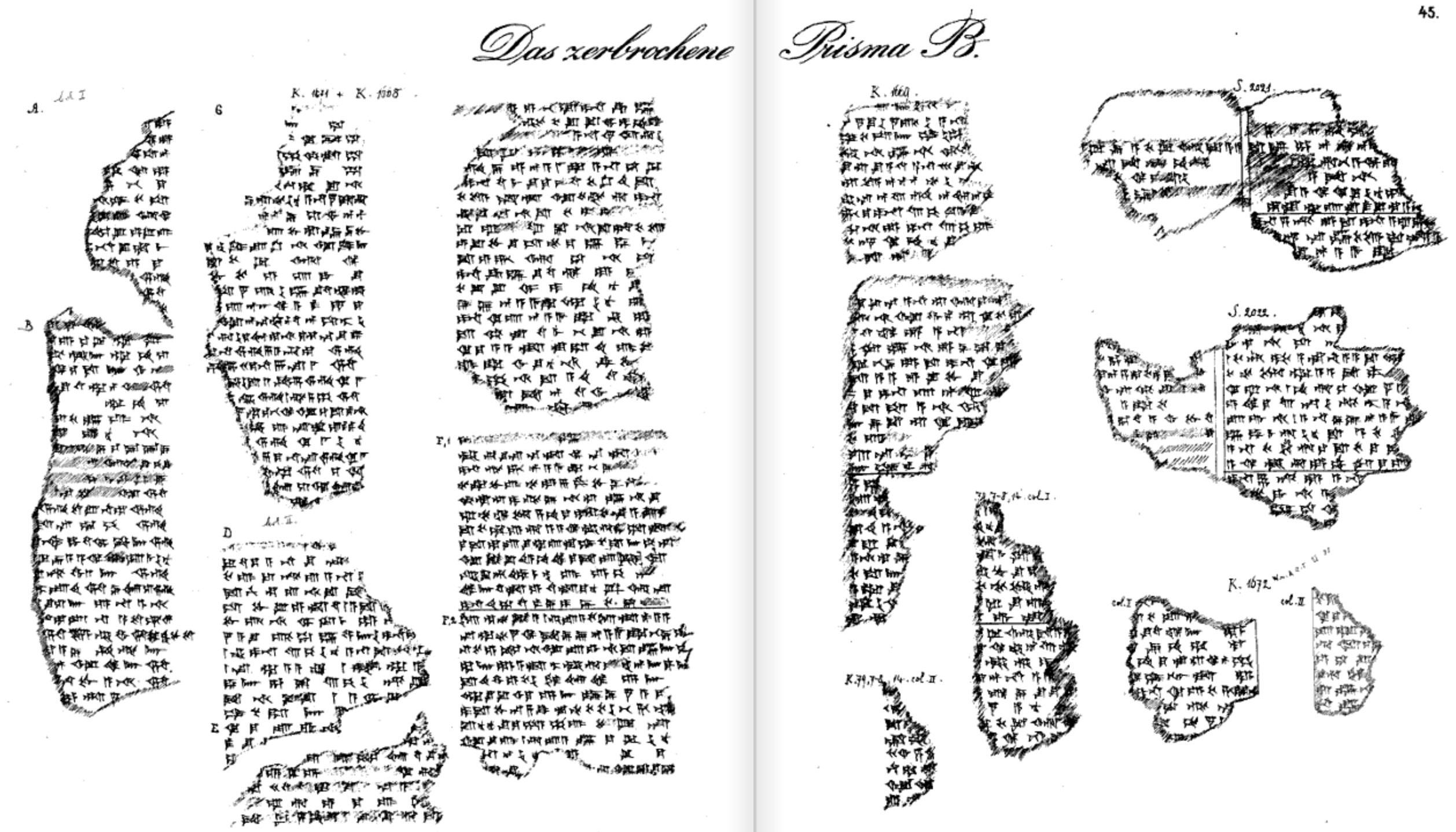
Prism B fragments

== Text ==
Here is some of the text from journal article : Inscribed Prisms of Sargon II from Nimrud.

Sargon, great king, mighty king....king of Sumer and Akkad. Favourite of the great gods; upon me the gods Assur, Nabu and Marduk Bestowed a kingdom without peer and promoted the favourable calling of my name to the highest place. who took care of Sippar, Nippur, Babylon, and Brosippa, talents of gold 730 talents shekel (of silver?) for the work upon Esarra the shrine of the god Assur I (laid out?) and make it shine like the light of day. With 16 ta(lents of) bright (gold)....

(The man of Sa)maria who with a king (hostile to) me had consorted together not to do service and not to bring tribute and they did battle in the strength of the great gods, my lords I clashed with them 7280 people with (their) chariots and the gods their trust, as a spoil I counted, 200 chariots as my royal muster. I mustered from among them the rest of them I caused to take their dwelling in the midst of Assyria The city of Samaria I restored and greater than before I caused it to become. People of lands conquered by my two hands I brought within it; my officer as prefect over them I placed, and together with the people of Assyria I counted them The people of the land of Musur and the Arabians I caused the blaze of Ashur my lord to overwhelm them...

== See also ==
- Annals of Sargon II
