= Library of Ashurbanipal =

7th-century-BC archaeological collection of clay tablets in Iraq

Coordinates: 36.3594°N 43.1528°E

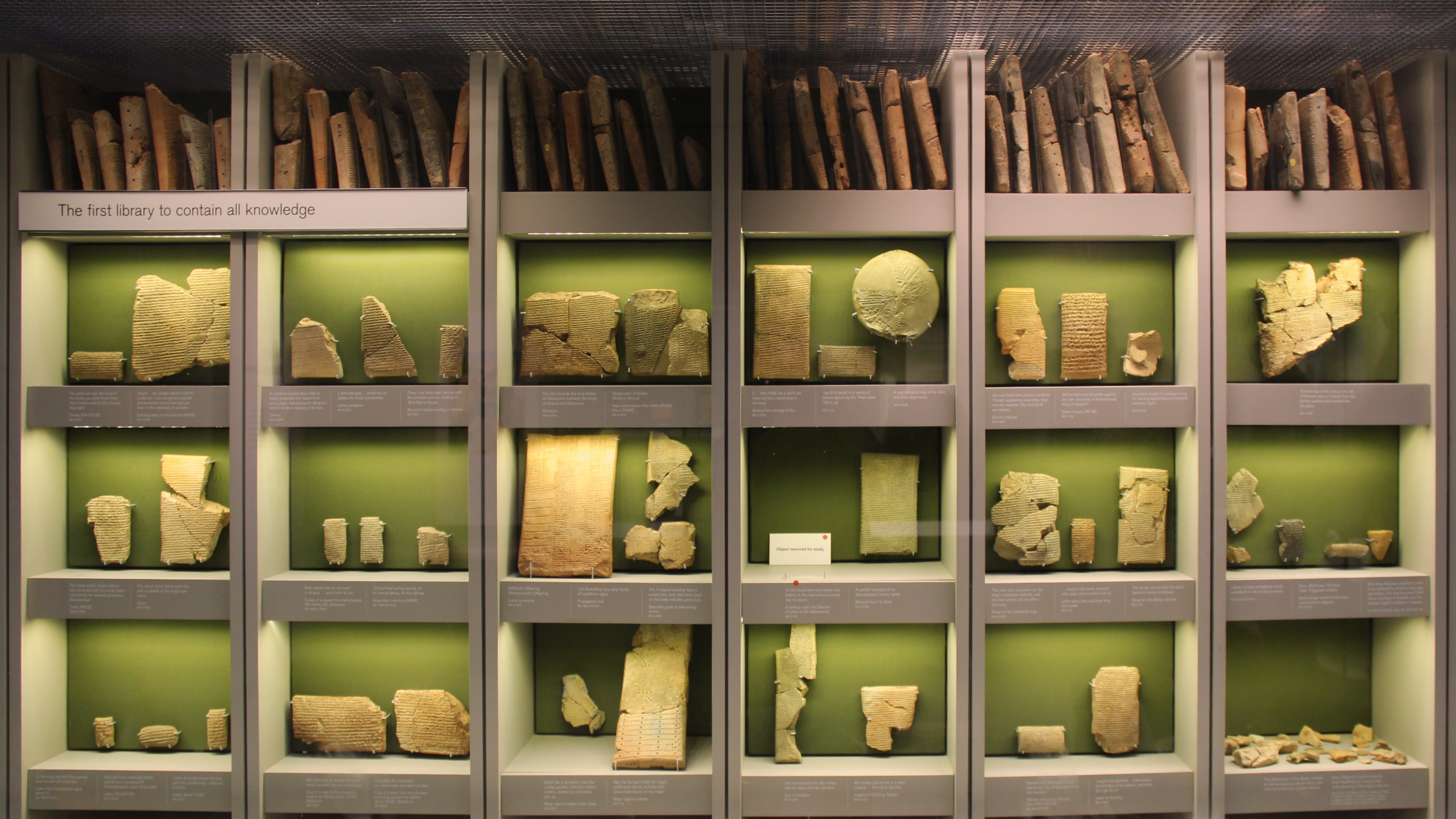
- The Library of Ashurbanipal in the British Museum
- Location: Nineveh, capital of Assyria
- Established: 7th century BCE

Collection
- Size: over 30,000 cuneiform tablets

The Royal Library of Ashurbanipal, named after Ashurbanipal, the last great king of the Assyrian Empire, is a collection of more than 30,000 clay tablets and fragments containing texts of all kinds and in various languages from the 7th century BCE. Among its holdings was the famous Epic of Gilgamesh.

Ashurbanipal's Library gives modern historians information regarding people of the ancient Near East. In his Outline of History, H. G. Wells calls the library "the most precious source of historical material in the world."

The materials were found in the archaeological site of Kouyunjik (ancient Nineveh, capital of Assyria) in northern Mesopotamia. The site is in modern-day northern Iraq, within the city of Mosul.

== Discovery ==
The library is an archaeological discovery credited to Austen Henry Layard; most tablets were taken to England and can now be found in the British Museum, but the first discovery was made in late 1849 in the so-called South-West Palace, which was the Royal Palace of king Sennacherib (705–681 BCE).

Three years later, Hormuzd Rassam, Layard's assistant, discovered a similar library in the palace of King Ashurbanipal (668–627 BCE), on the opposite side of the mound. Unfortunately, no record was made of the findings, and soon after reaching Europe, the tablets appeared to have been irreparably mixed with each other and with tablets originating from other sites. Thus, it is almost impossible today to reconstruct the original contents of each of the two main libraries.

== Contents ==
Ashurbanipal was known as a tenacious martial commander; however, he was also a recognized intellectual who was literate, and a passionate collector of texts and tablets. In collecting texts for his library, he wrote to cities and centers of learning across Mesopotamia, instructing them to send him copies of all work written in the region. As an apprentice scribe he mastered both the Akkadian and the Sumerian languages. He sent scribes into every region of the Neo-Assyrian Empire to collect ancient texts. He hired scholars and scribes to copy texts, mainly from Babylonian sources.

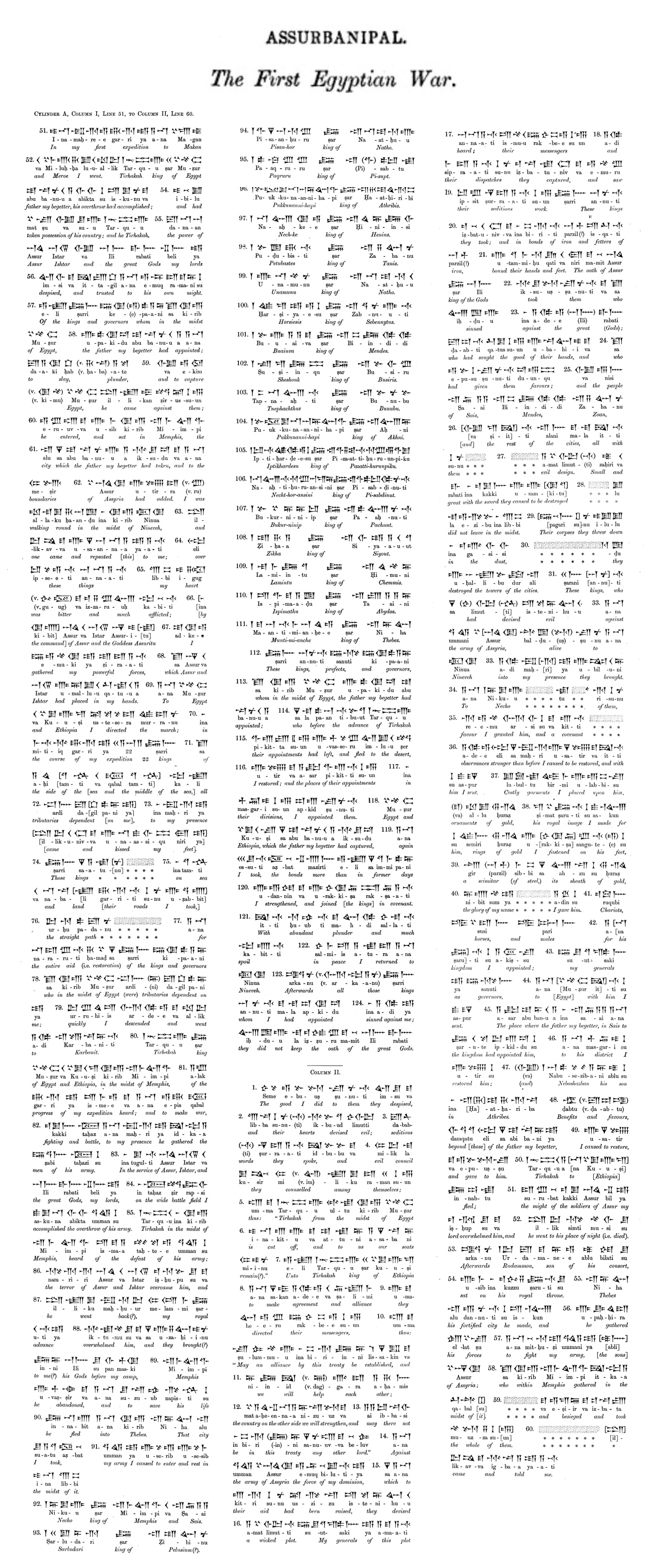
Account of Ashurbanipal's campaign in Egypt against Taharqua (translation of the cuneiform, from the Rassam cylinder of Ashurbanipal).

Ashurbanipal used war loot as a means of stocking his library. Because he was known for being cruel to his enemies, Ashurbanipal was able to use threats to gain materials from Babylonia and surrounding areas. Ashurbanipal's intense interest in collecting divination texts was one of his driving motivations in collecting works for his library. His original motive may have been to "gain possession of rituals and incantations that were vital to maintain his royal power."

The royal library consists of approximately 30,000 tablets and writing boards with the majority of them being severely fragmented. Many of these tablets contain a stamp stating that they belonged to his palace. It can be gleaned from the conservation of the fragments that the number of tablets that existed in the library at the time of destruction was close to two thousand and the number of writing boards within the library can be placed at a total of three hundred. The majority of the tablet corpus (about 6,000) included colloquial compositions in the form of legislation, foreign correspondences and engagements, aristocratic declarations, and financial matters. The remaining texts contained divinations, omens, incantations and hymns to various gods, while others were concerned with medicine, astronomy, and literature. For all these texts in the library only ten contain expressive rhythmic literary works such as epics and myths.

The Babylonian texts of the Ashurbanipal libraries can be separated into two different groups: the literary compositions such as divination, religious, lexical, medical, mathematical and historical texts as well as epics and myths, on the one hand, and the legal documents on the other hand. The group of the legal documents covers letters, contracts and administrative texts and consists of 1128 Babylonian tablets and fragments. Within the group of the literary compositions, of which 1331 tablets and fragments are classified so far, the divination texts can further be differentiated between 759 so-called library texts, such as tablets of the various omen series and their commentaries, and 636 so-called archival texts such as omen reports, oracle enquiries and the like.

The Epic of Gilgamesh, a masterpiece of ancient Babylonian poetry, was found in the library, as was the Enûma Eliš creation story, the myth of Adapa, the first man, and stories such as the Poor Man of Nippur.

Another group of literary texts is the lexical texts and sign lists. There are twenty fragments of different tablets with archaic cuneiform signs arranged according to the syllabary A, whereas one is arranged according to the syllabary B. The Assyrian scribes of the Ashurbanipal Libraries needed sign lists to be able to read the old inscriptions and most of these lists were written by Babylonian scribes. The other groups of Babylonian written texts in Nineveh are the epics and myths and the historical texts with 1.4% each. There is only one mathematical text that is said to be excavated at Nineveh.

The texts were principally written in Akkadian in the cuneiform script; however many of the tablets do not have an exact derivation and it is often difficult to ascertain their original homeland. Many of the tablets are indeed composed in the Neo-Babylonian script, but many were also known to be written in Assyrian as well.

The tablets were often organized according to shape: four-sided tablets were for financial transactions, while round tablets recorded agricultural information. (In this era, some written documents were also on wood and others on wax tablets.) Tablets were separated according to their contents and placed in different rooms: government, history, law, astronomy, geography, and so on. The contents were identified by colored marks or brief written descriptions, and sometimes by the "incipit", or the first few words that began the text.

Nineveh was destroyed in 612 BCE by a coalition of Babylonians, Scythians and Medes, an ancient Iranian people. It is believed that during the burning of the palace, a great fire must have ravaged the library, causing the clay cuneiform tablets to become partially baked. This potentially destructive event helped preserve the tablets. As well as texts on clay tablets, some of the texts may have been inscribed onto wax boards which, because of their organic nature, have been lost.

The British Museum's collections database counts 30,943 "tablets" in the entire Nineveh library collection, and the Trustees of the Museum propose to issue an updated catalogue as part of the Ashurbanipal Library Project. If all smaller fragments that actually belong to the same text are deducted, it is likely that the "library" originally included some 10,000 texts in all. The original library documents, however, which would have included leather scrolls, wax boards, and possibly papyri, contained perhaps a much broader spectrum of knowledge than that known from the surviving clay-tablet cuneiform texts. A large share of Ashurbanipal's libraries consisted of writing-boards and not clay tablets.

== Ashurbanipal library project ==
Created in collaboration with the University of Mosul and funded by the Townley group, the British Museum has been compiling a catalogue record of artifacts from Ashurbanipal's library since 2002. The goal is to document the library in as much detail as possible in texts and images including sign-transliterations, hand-drawn copies, translations, and high-quality digital images.

The project was undertaken in three stages with published results coming out in 2003, 2004, and 2014. Dr. Jeanette C. Fincke studied ancient oriental studies, Hittitology, and Egyptology at the University of Hamburg and was involved heavily during the first two stages. During the first stage, Fincke compiled an authoritative list of the 3500 library tablets in Babylonian scripts. During the second stage, Fincke also compiled several astrological texts from Nineveh. The third stage was completed with the help of professor Riekel Borger, who died mid-catalogue in December 2010, and completed with the help of Andrew Mellon Foundation from 2009 to 2013 under the direction of Jon Taylor. During this last stage, the library produced high resolution digital images of all the library tables. Each image is created using 14 images which allows a virtual two-dimensional representation of the three-dimensional tablets. The images have been released on the Cuneiform Digital Library Initiative website and British Museum Collections online site.

As of 2020, the project has been focusing on two endeavors: the first is concerned with reconstructing medical texts from cataloged tablets, and the second is a project that is using scribes notations at the bottom of each tablet to extrapolate the scale and scope of the tablet collection. The catalogue is still being updated and was made possible by contribution of material from several colleagues and projects including: State Archives of Assyria, Cuneiform Commentaries Project, Digital Corpus of Cuneiform Lexical Texts, and Royal Inscriptions of the Neo-Assyrian Period.

From 2020-2023 a collaborative project, Reading the Library of Ashurbanipal: A multi-sectional Analysis of Assyriology's Foundational Corpus, was created between the British Museum and LMU Munich explored the library's initial origins. The goal of the project was to examine the scribal notes added to the end of the tablets (known as "colophons") to understand how and why the collection was produced. The project was led by Dr. Jon Taylor and Professor Enrique Jiménez.

The Project has been maintained and added to by many people, including volunteers from across the world. Since 2008, the project has been directed by Jon Taylor. Before that, from 2005-2007 it was directed by Irving Finkel, and from 2002-2005 by Christopher Walker. The project curators on the research projects from 2020-2023 were Babette Schnitzlein, Strahil Panayotov, and Krisztian Simko.

The Hermitage of St. Petersburg, The Louvre of Paris, The Vatican Museums of Vatican City, the Penn Museum of Philadelphia, The Kunsthistorisches Museum of Vienna, and the de Liagre Böhl collection of Leiden have all made their collections available for the project.

== List of significant tablets and cylinders ==
- Azekah Inscription
- Esarhaddon's Treaty with Ba'al of Tyre
- Nimrud Tablet K.3751
- Sargon II's Prism A
- Venus tablet of Ammisaduqa
- Epic of Gilgamesh
- Enûma Eliš
- Rassam cylinder
- K.3364
Tablets and cylinders from the Royal Library
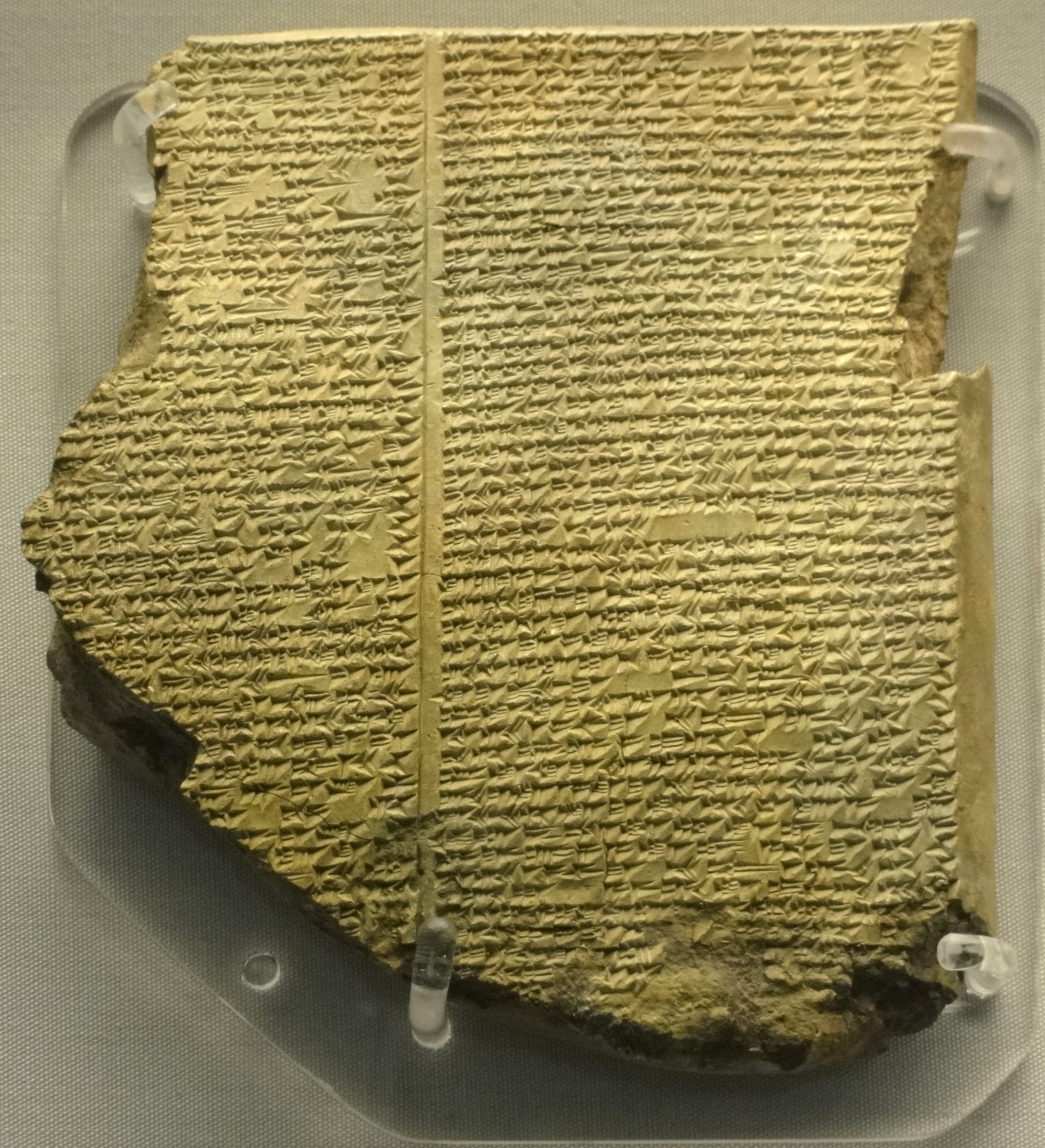
Tablet containing part of the Epic of Gilgamesh (Tablet 11 depicting the Deluge), now part of the holdings of the British Museum

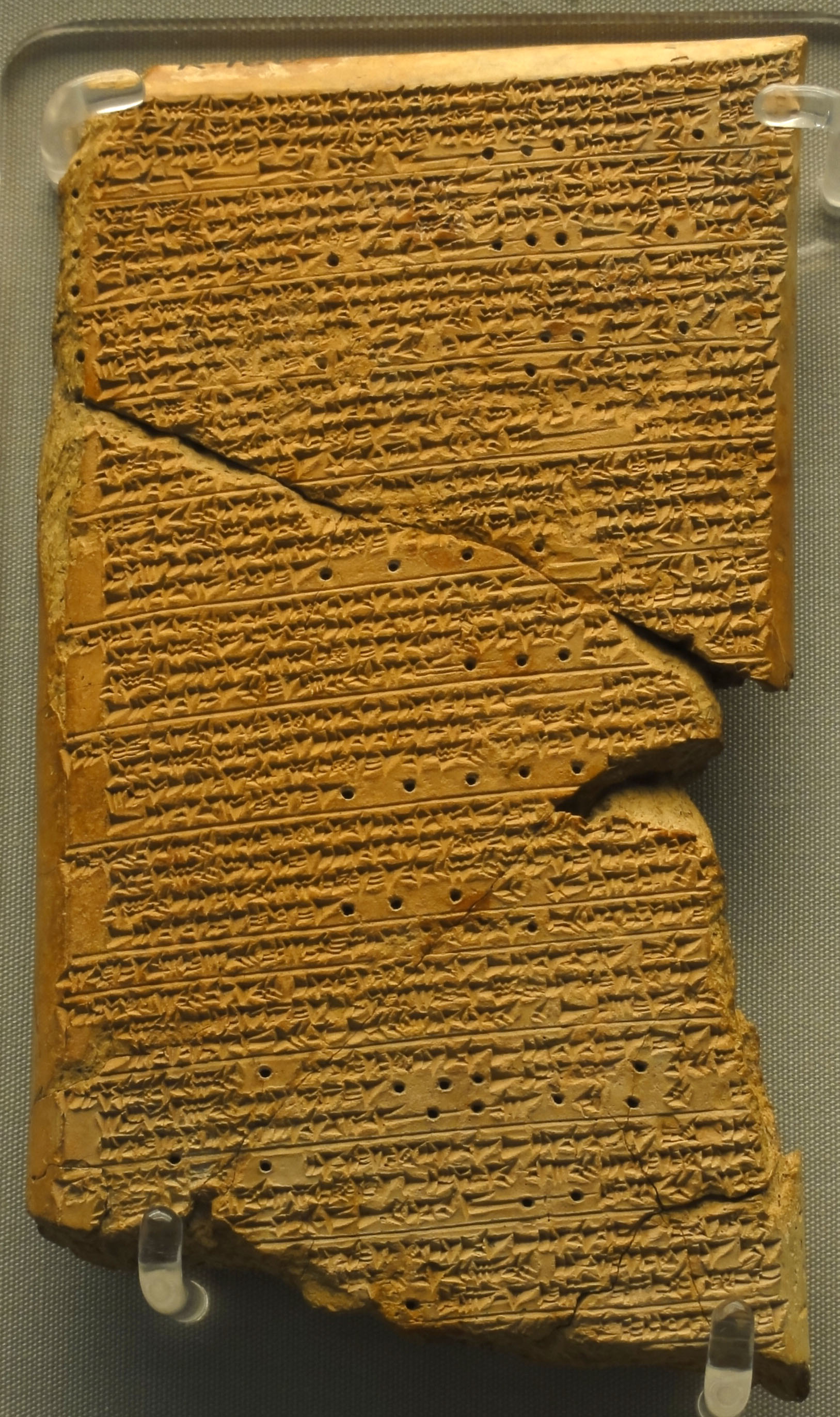
"Venus Tablet of Ammisaduqa" with astrological forecasts. British Museum reference K.160 .

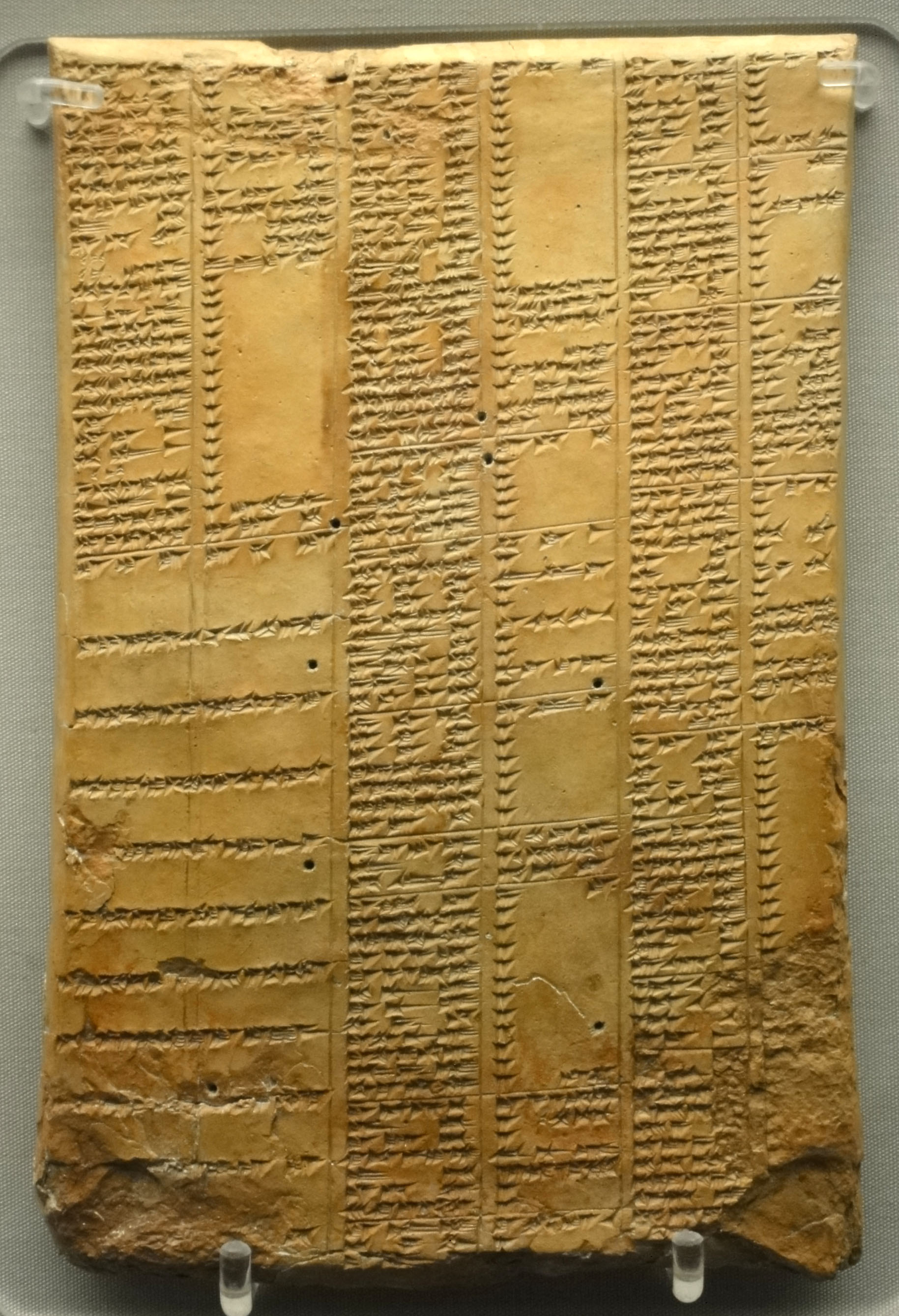
Tablet of synonyms. British Museum reference K.4375 .

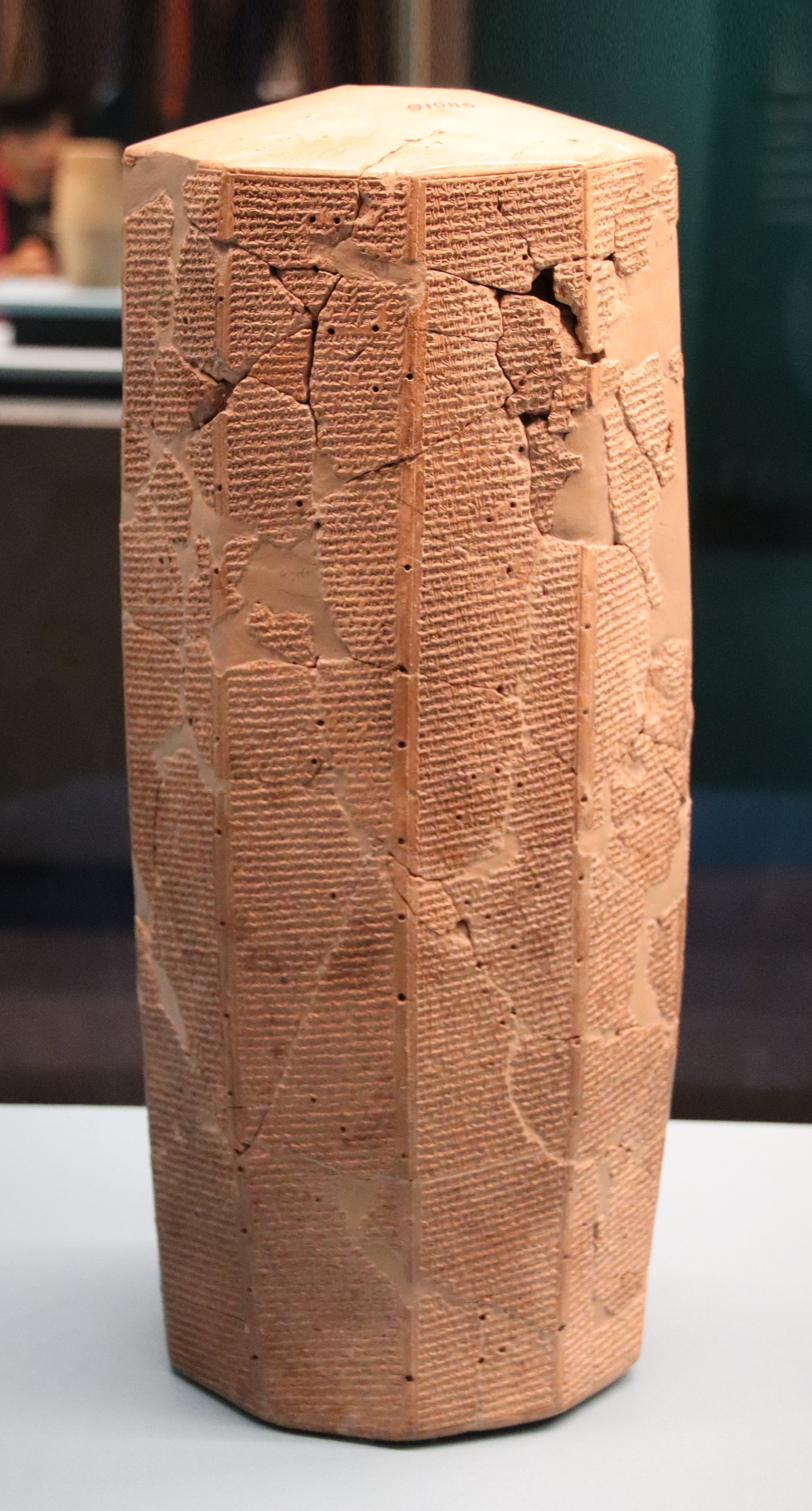
The 10-faced Rassam cylinder of Ashurbanipal, British Museum.

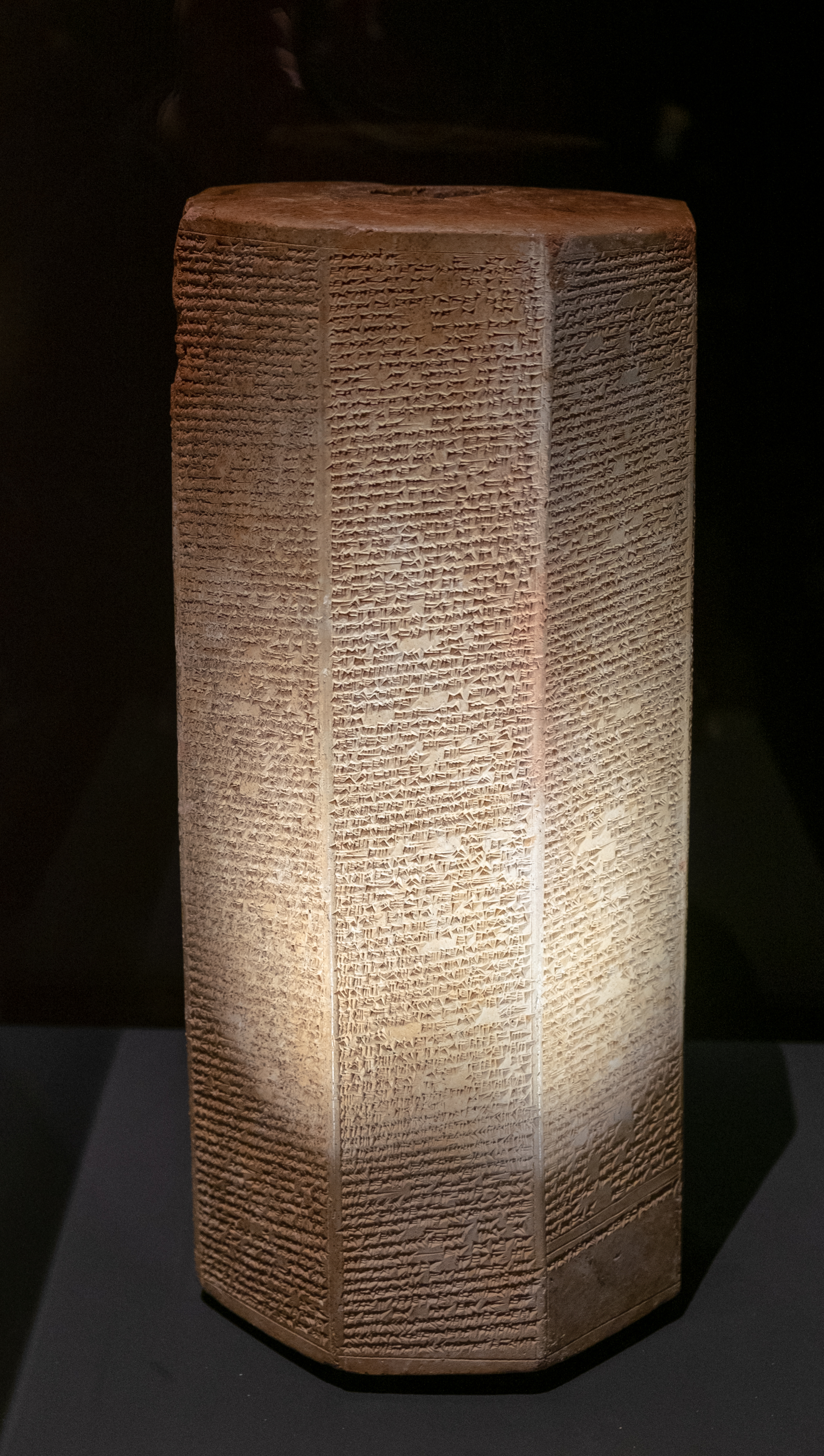
Prism of Sennacherib, containing records of his military campaigns, culminating with Babylon's destruction. British Museum BM 91032.

== See also ==
- Great libraries of the ancient world
- Ashurbanipal

== Bibliography ==
- Fincke, Jeanette (2004). "The British Museum's Ashurbanipal Library Project". Iraq, 66, Ninevah. 66: 55–60. doi:10.1017/S0021088900001637. S2CID 190727609.
- Polastron, Lucien X. (2007). Books On Fire: The Tumultuous Story Of The World's Great Libraries. London: Thames & Hudson Ltd.
