= Assyrian conquest of Egypt =

673–663 BCE military campaign

- Part of the Conquests of the Neo-Assyrian Empire
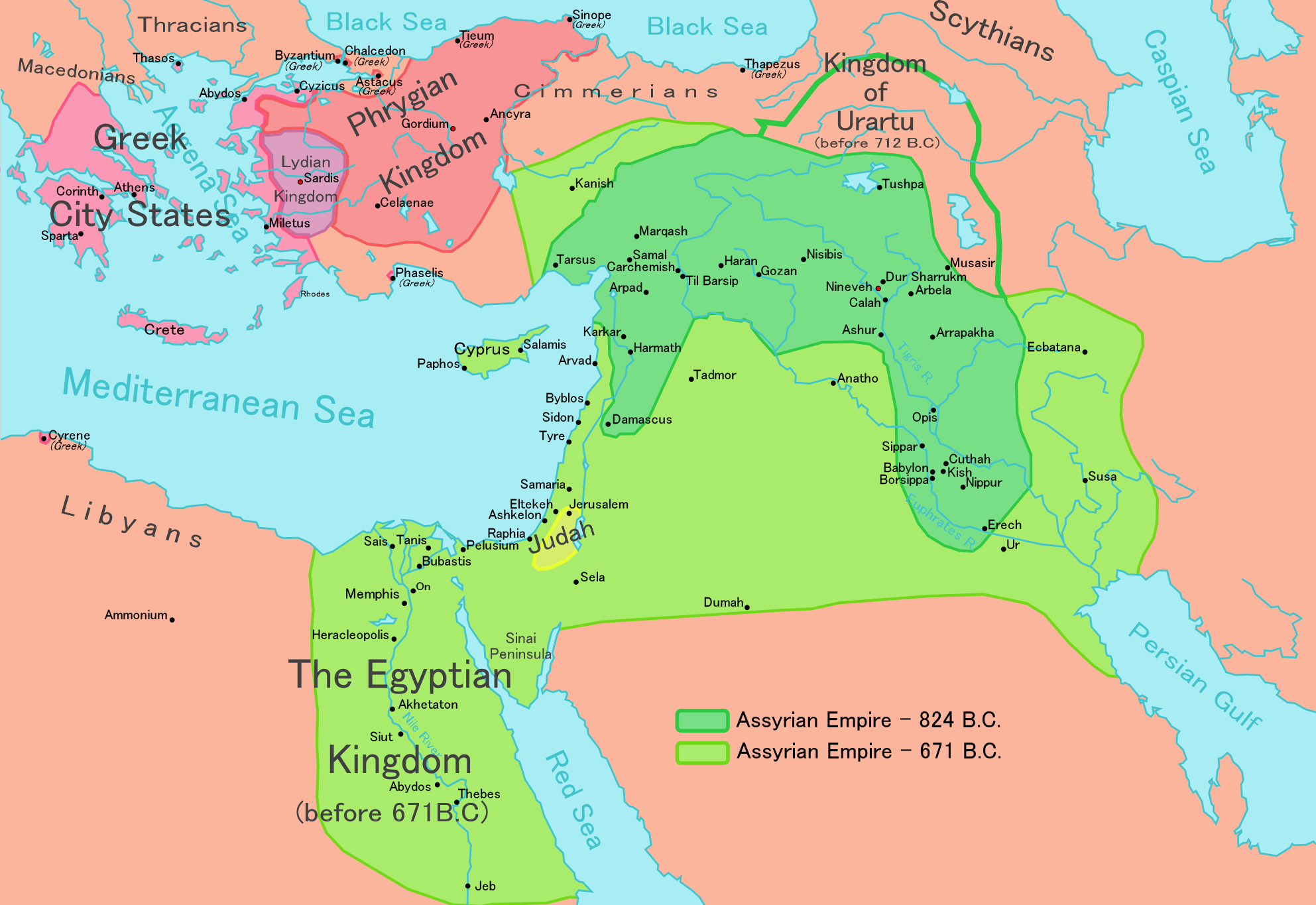
- Map of the Neo-Assyrian Empire 824-671 BCE
Date	673–663 BCE
Location	Egypt
Result	Assyrian victory
Territorial changes	The Neo-Assyrian Empire vassalised Egypt for a period of about 10 years

Belligerents
Neo-Assyrian Empire; Twenty-sixth Dynasty of Egypt	Twenty-fifth Dynasty of Egypt

The Assyrian conquest of Egypt covered a relatively short period of the Neo-Assyrian Empire from 673 to 663 BCE. The conquest of Egypt not only placed a land of great cultural prestige under Assyrian rule but also brought the Neo-Assyrian Empire to its greatest extent.

== Context ==
Taharqa, pharaoh of the Twenty-fifth Dynasty of Egypt and qore of the Kingdom of Kush, began agitating people within the Neo-Assyrian Empire in an attempt to gain a foothold in the region. As a result, in 701 BCE, Hezekiah, the king of Judah, Lule, the king of Sidon, Sidka, the king of Ashkelon, and the king of Ekron formed an alliance with Egypt against Assyria. The Neo-Assyrian emperor Sennacherib (r. 705–681) attacked the rebels, conquering Ashkelon, Sidon and Ekron and defeating the Egyptians and driving them from the region. He marched toward Jerusalem, destroying 46 towns and villages (including the heavily defended city of Lachish) in his path. This is graphically described in Isaiah 10. Exactly what happened next is unclear: the Bible says an angel of the Lord killed 185,000 Assyrian soldiers at Jerusalem after Hezekiah prayed in the temple; Sennacherib's account says Judah paid him tribute and he left. There are various other theories as to why the Assyrians failed to take Jerusalem and withdrew to Assyria., including a threat from Taharqa's army, disease, divine intervention, Hezekiah's surrender, or Herodotus' mice theory.

In 681, Sennacherib was murdered by one or more of his sons, perhaps as retribution for his destruction of Babylon. According to 2 Kings 19:37, while praying to the god Nisroch, he was killed by two of his sons, Adramalech and Sharezer, and both of these sons subsequently fled to Urartu; this is repeated in Isaiah 37:38 and alluded to in 2 Chronicles 32:21.

== Invasion of Esarhaddon (673 BCE) ==
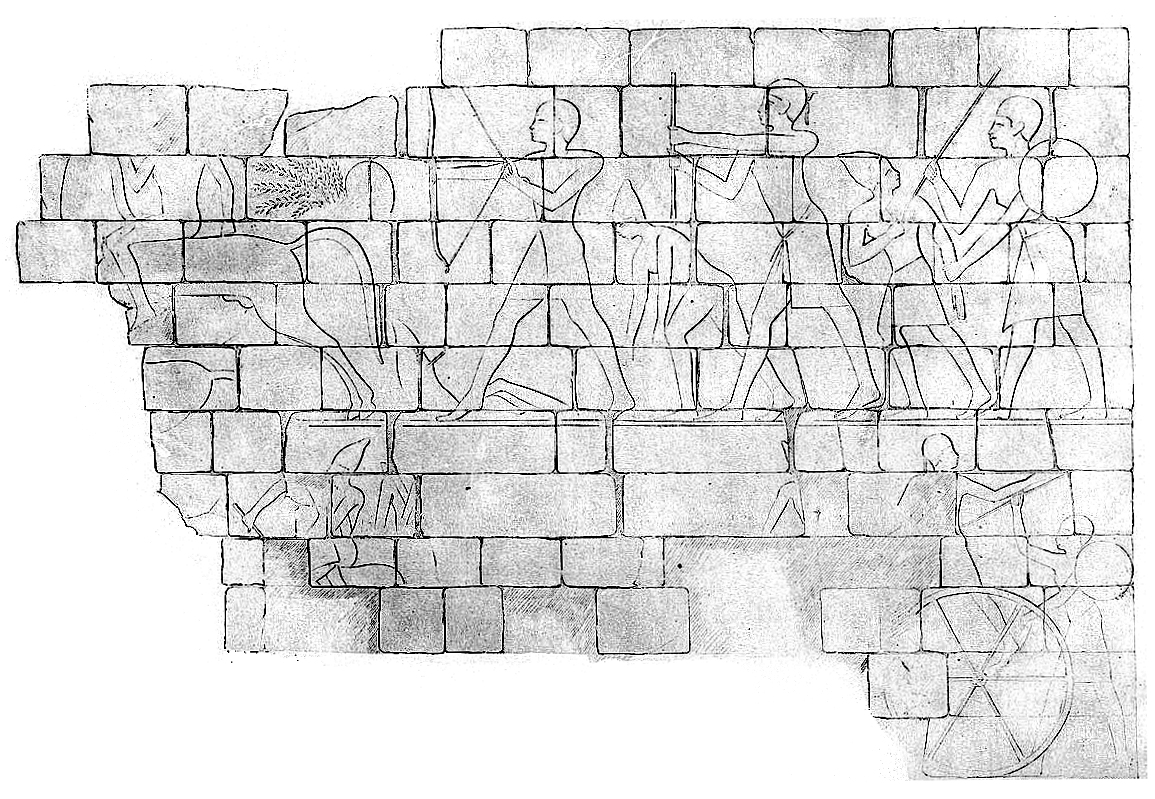
Relief from the Temple of Amun, Jebel Barkal, showing Kushites defeating Assyrians

Esarhaddon (ruled 681–669), the son of Sennacherib, led several campaigns against the pharaoh-qore Taharqa of Egypt and Kush, which he recorded on several monuments. His first attack in 677 BCE was aimed at pacifying Arab tribes around the Dead Sea, led him as far as the Brook of Egypt.

=== Campaign of 673 BCE ===
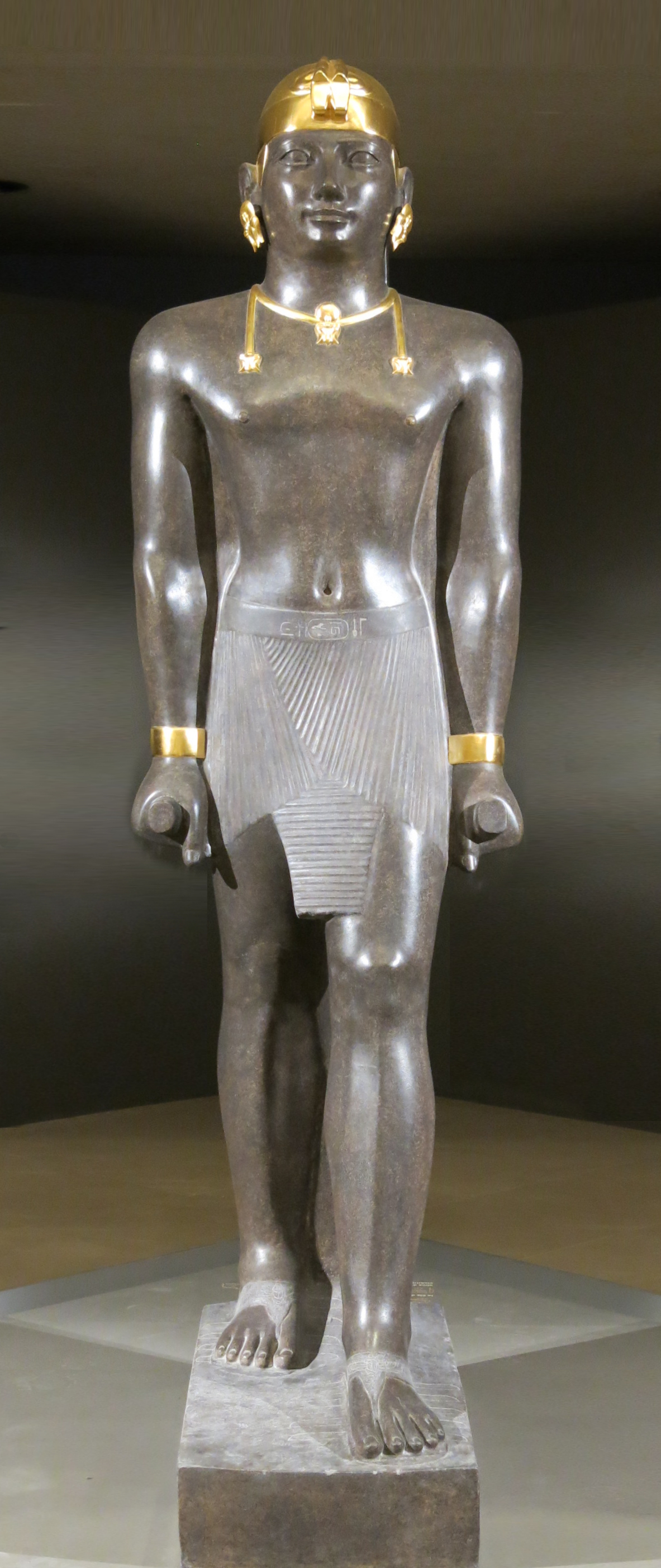
Statue of Kushite ruler and pharaoh of the 25th Dynasty Taharqa (ruled 690-664 BCE), who led the fight against the Assyrians. Louvre Museum reconstruction.

Esarhaddon raided Egypt in 673. This invasion, which only a few Assyrian sources discuss, ended in what some scholars have assumed was possibly one of Assyria's worst defeats. Taharqa and his army defeated the Assyrians outright in 674, according to Babylonian records. For years, the Egyptians had sponsored rebels and dissenters in Assyria, and Esarhaddon had hoped to storm Egypt and take this rival out in one fell swoop. Because Esarhaddon had marched his army at great speed, the Assyrians were exhausted once they arrived outside the Egyptian-controlled city of Ashkelon, where Taharqa's forces defeated them. Following this defeat, Esarhaddon abandoned his plan to conquer Egypt for the moment and withdrew back to Nineveh.

=== Campaign of 671 ===
Two years later, Esarhaddon launched a full invasion. In the early months of 671, Esarhaddon again marched against Egypt. The army assembled for this second Egyptian campaign was considerably larger than the one Esarhaddon had used in 673. He marched much more slowly to avoid the problems that had plagued his previous attempt. On his way, he passed through Harran, one of the major cities in the western parts of his empire. Here, a prophecy was revealed to the king, which predicted that Esarhaddon's conquest of Egypt would be successful. According to a letter sent to Ashurbanipal after Esarhaddon's death, the prophecy was the following:

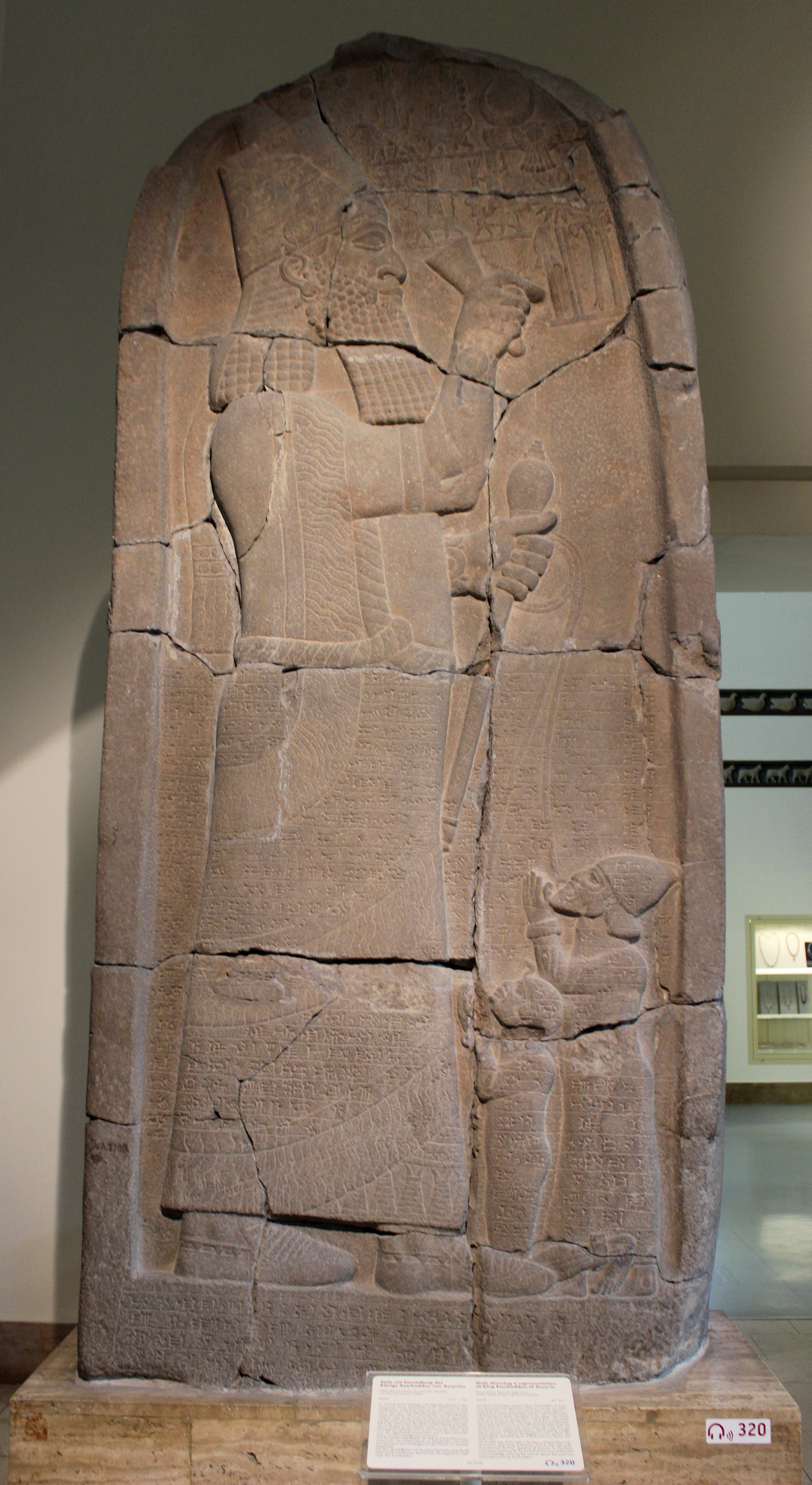
The victory stele of Esarhaddon (now in the Pergamon Museum) was created following the king's victory in Egypt and depicts Esarhaddon in a majestic pose with a war mace in his hand and a vassal king kneeling before him. Also present is Ushankhuru, the small son of the defeated pharaoh Taharqa, kneeling and with a rope around his neck.

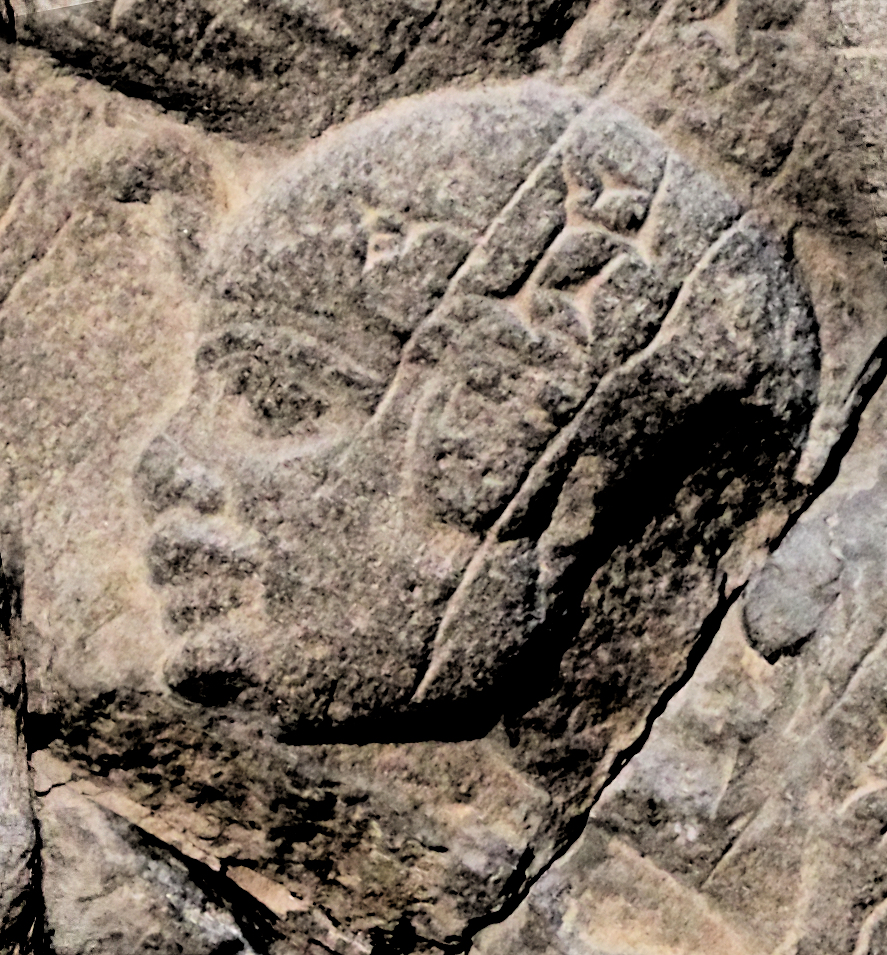
Ushankhuru, the captive son of Taharqa, as depicted by the Assyrians on the Victory stele of Esarhaddon

When Esarhaddon marched to Egypt, a temple of cedar wood was erected at Harran. There, the god Sin was enthroned on a wooden column, two crowns on his head, and standing in front of him was the god Nuska. Esarhaddon entered and placed the crowns onto his head, and the following was proclaimed: 'You shall go forth and conquer the world!' And he went and conquered Egypt.

Three months after receiving this prophecy, Esarhaddon's forces were victorious in their first battle with the Egyptians. Despite the prophecy and initial success, Esarhaddon was not convinced of his safety. Just eleven days after he had defeated the Egyptians, he performed the "substitute king" ritual, an ancient Assyrian method intended to protect and shield the king from imminent danger announced by some sort of omen. Esarhaddon had performed the ritual earlier in his reign, but this time it left him unable to command his invasion of Egypt.

In 671, Esarhaddon took and sacked Memphis, where he captured numerous royal family members. Although the Pharaoh Taharqa had escaped to the south, Esarhaddon captured the Pharaoh's family, including his son and wife, and most of the royal court, which was sent back to Assyria as hostages. Esarhaddon reorganized the political structure in the north, governors loyal to the Assyrian king were placed in charge of the conquered territories, and he established Necho I as king at Sais. Upon Esarhaddon's return to Assyria, he erected a stele alongside the previous Egyptian and Assyrian stelae of Nahr el-Kalb, as well as the victory stele of Esarhaddon at Zincirli Höyük, showing Taharqa's young son Ushankhuru in bondage.

The Babylonian Chronicles retells how Egypt "was sacked and its gods were abducted". The conquest resulted in the relocation of a large number of Egyptians to the Assyrian heartland. In an excerpt from the text inscribed on his victory stele, Esarhaddon describes the conquest with the following words:

I slew multitudes of [Taharqa's] men, and I smote him five times with the point of my javelin, with wounds from which there was no recovery. Memphis, his royal city, in half a day, with mines, tunnels, assaults, I besieged, I captured, I destroyed, I devastated, I burned with fire. His queen, his harem, Ushanahuru, his heir, and the rest of his sons and daughters, his property and his goods, his horses, his cattle, his sheep, in countless numbers, I carried off to Assyria. The root of Kush I tore up out of Egypt, and not one therein escaped to submit to me. Over all of Egypt, I appointed kings, viceroys, governors, commandants, overseers and scribes anew. Offerings and fixed dues I established for Assur and the great gods for all time; my royal tribute and tax, yearly without ceasing, I imposed upon them. I had a stele made with my name inscribed thereon, and on it I caused it to be written the glory and valour of Assur, my lord, my mighty deeds, how I went to and from the protection of Assur, my lord, and the might of my conquering hand. For the gaze of all my foes, to the end of days, I set it up.

— Victory stele of Esarhaddon

Upon the Assyrian king's departure, however, Taharqa was intrigued by the affairs of Lower Egypt and fanned numerous revolts. In 669 BC, Taharqa reoccupied Memphis, as well as the Delta, and recommenced intrigues with the king of Tyre. The Assyrian governors and local puppet rulers Esarhaddon had appointed over Egypt were obliged to flee the restive native populace who yearned for independence now that the Kushites and Nubians had been ejected.

A new campaign was launched by Esarhaddon in 669. However, he became ill on the way and died. His elder son Shamash-shum-ukin became king of Babylon, and his son Ashurbanipal became king of Assyria, with Ashurbanipal holding the senior position and Babylon subject to Nineveh.

The remains of three colossal statues of Taharqa were found at the palace entrance at Nineveh. These statues were probably brought back as war trophies by Esarhaddon, who also brought back royal hostages and numerous luxury objects from Egypt.

== Invasion of Ashurbanipal (667 BCE) ==
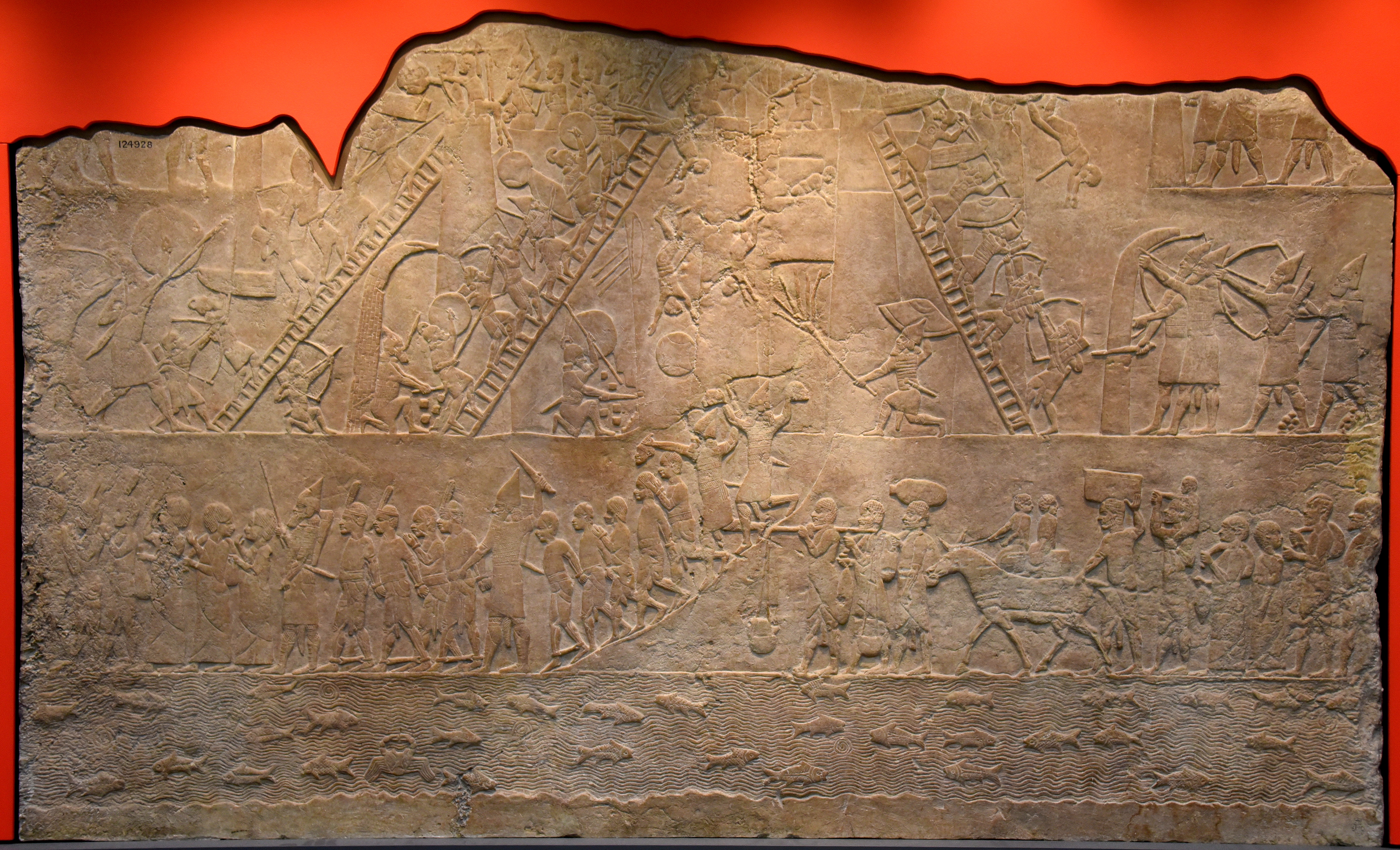
Assyrian siege of an Egyptian fort, probably a scene from the war in 667 BCE referring to the capture of Memphis. Sculpted in 645 – 635 BCE, under Ashurbanipal. British Museum.

Ashurbanipal, or "Ashur-bani-apli" (Ashurbanapli, Asnapper), succeeded his father Esarhaddon to the throne. He continued to campaign in and to dominate Egypt, when not distracted by having to deal with pressures from the Medes to the east, and Cimmerians and Scythians to the north of Assyria. He installed a native Egyptian Pharaoh, Psammetichus, as a vassal king in 664 BCE.

After Gyges of Lydia's appeal for Assyrian help against the Cimmerians was rejected, Lydian mercenaries were sent to Psammetichus. By 656/655 BCE, this vassal king was able to declare outright independence from Assyria with impunity, particularly as Ashurbanipal's older brother, Shamash-shum-ukin of Babylon, became infused with Babylonian nationalism, and began a major civil war in that year. However, the new dynasty in Egypt wisely maintained friendly relations with Assyria.

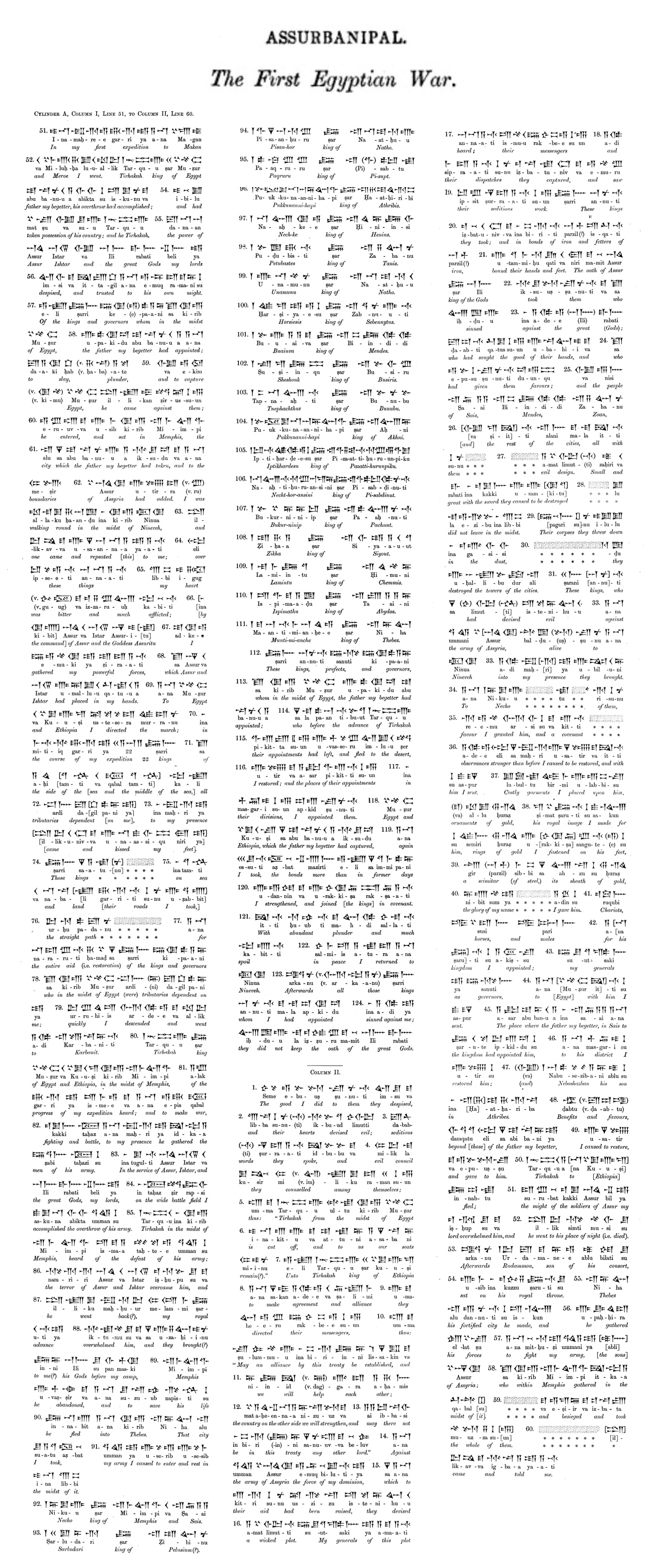
Account of Ashurbanipal's campaign in Egypt against Taharqua (translation of the cuneiform, from the Rassam cylinder of Ashurbanipal).

=== First campaign against Taharqa (667 BCE) ===
Ashurbanipal defeated Taharqa in 667 BCE, who afterwards fled to Thebes. Ashurbanipal marched the Assyrian army as far south as Thebes, and sacked numerous revolting cities:

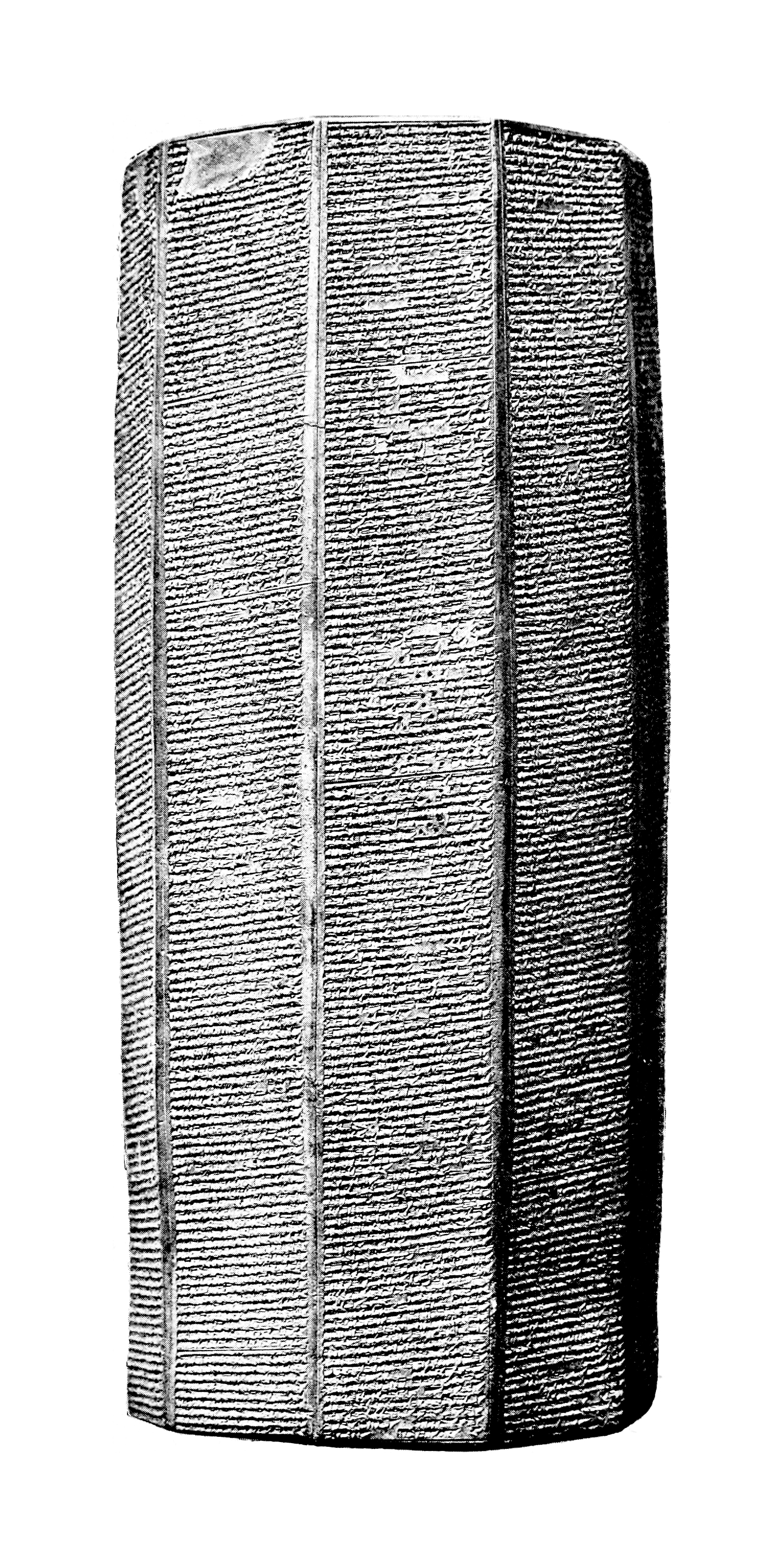
Rassam cylinder of Ashurbanipal

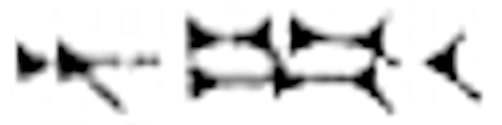
In my first campaign I marched against Magan, Meluhha, Taharqa ( Tar-qu-u), king of Egypt (Mu-ṣur) and Ethiopia ( Ku-u-si Kush), whom Esarhaddon, king of Assyria, the father who begot me, had defeated, and whose land he brought under his sway. This same Taharqa forgot the might of Ashur, Ishtar and the other great gods, my lords, and put his trust in his own power. He turned against the kings and regents whom my own father had appointed in Egypt. He entered and took residence in Memphis, the city which my own father had conquered and incorporated into Assyrian territory....

— Rassam cylinder of Ashurbanipal.

As late as 665 BC, the vassal rulers of Sais, Mendes, and Pelusium were still making overtures to Taharqa in Kush. The rebellion was stopped and Ashurbanipal appointed as his vassal ruler in Egypt Necho I, who had been king of the city Sais, and Necho's son Psamtik I, who had been educated at the Assyrian capital of Nineveh during Esarhaddon's reign. After his victory, Ashurbanipal left Egypt.

Taharqa died in the city of Thebes in 664 BCE. He was followed by his appointed successor Tantamani, a son of Shabaka, himself succeeded by a son of Taharqa, Atlanersa.

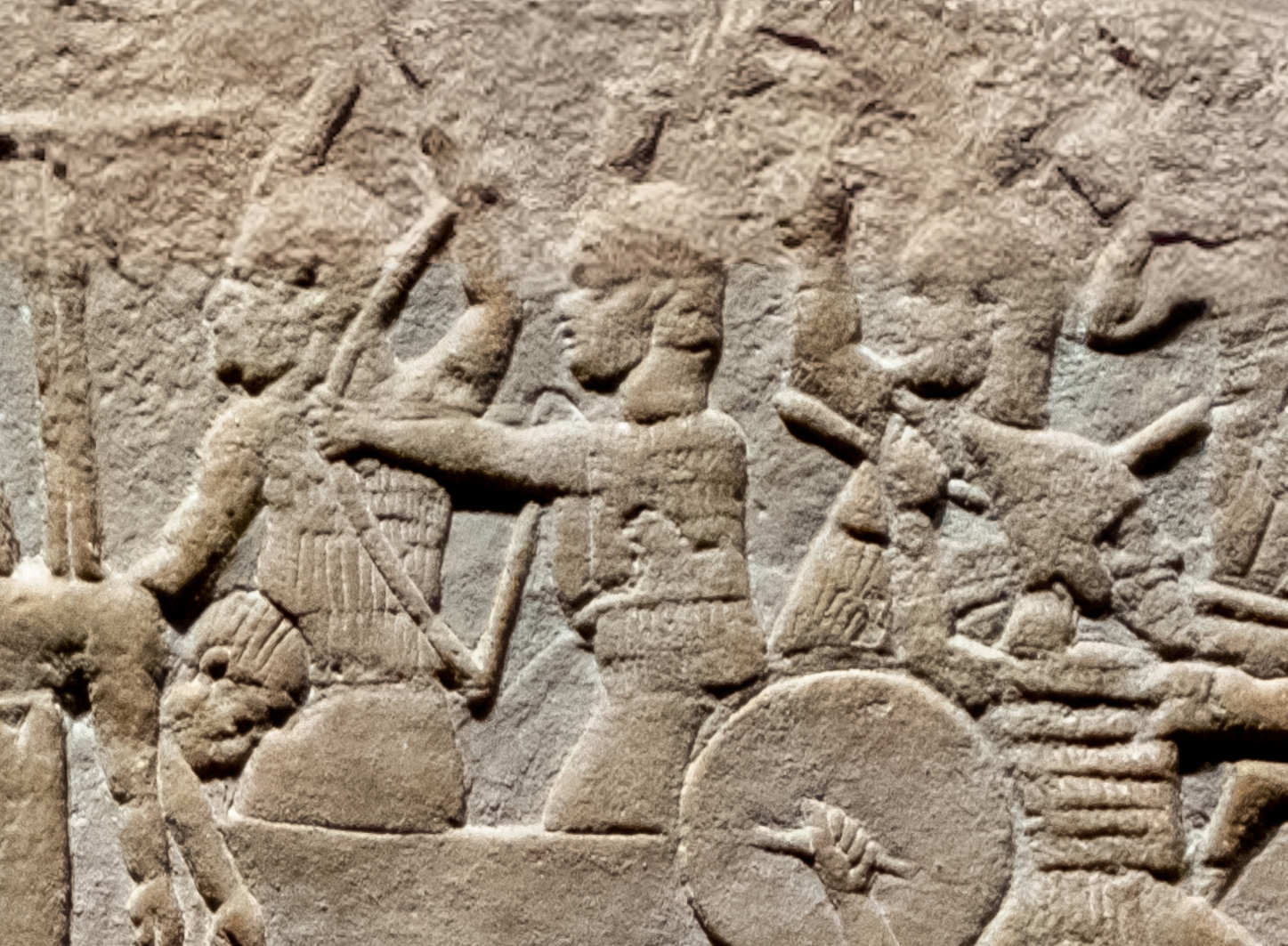
Armoured Kushite soldiers of Taharqa defending their city from the Assyrian assault

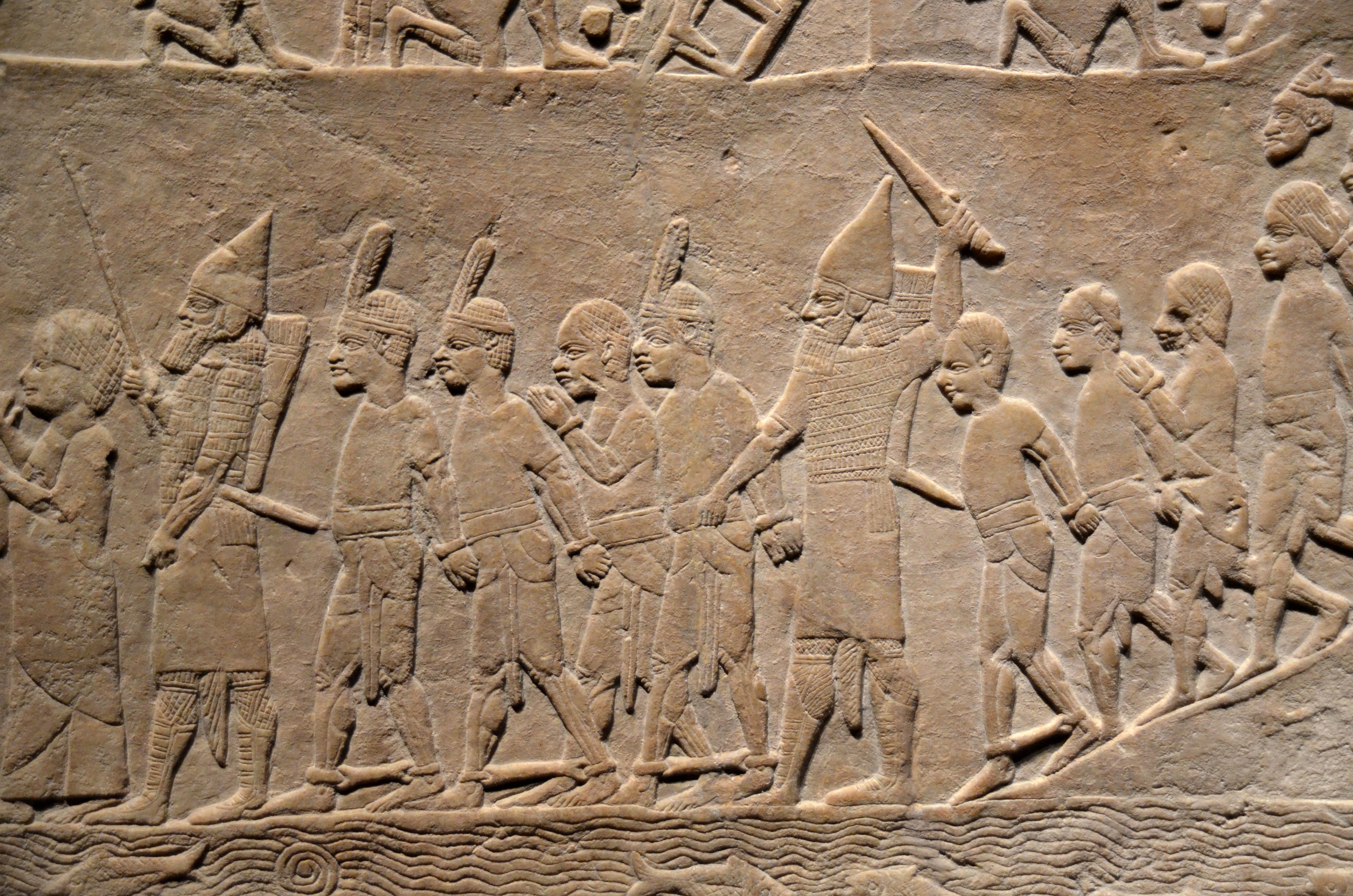
Nubian prisoners escorted by Assyrian guards out of the Egyptian city.

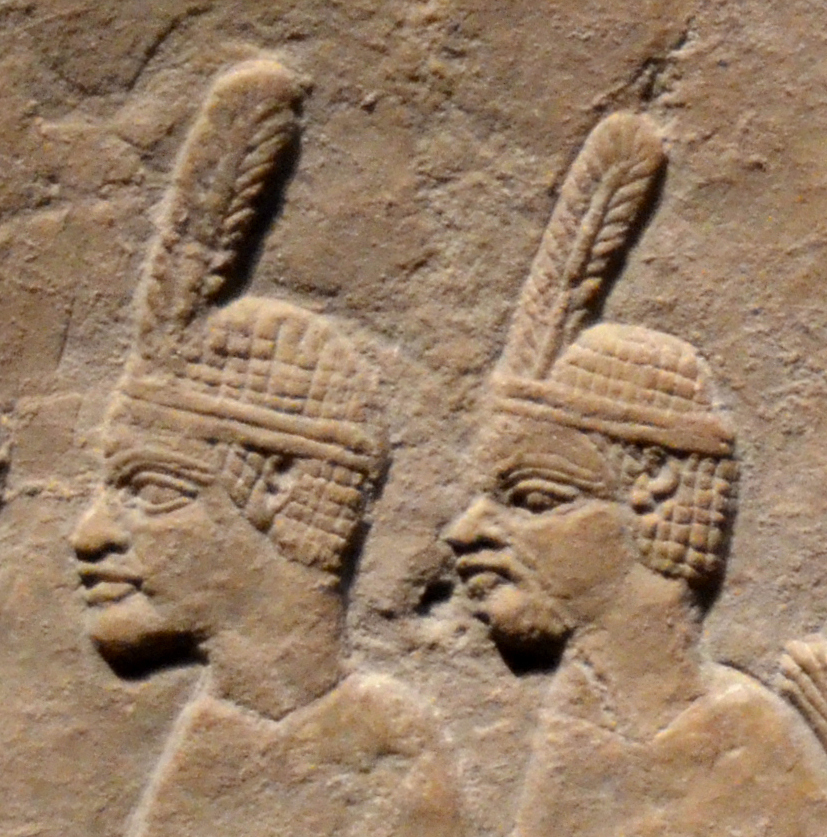
Nubian prisoners. They wear the typical one-feathered headgear of Taharqua's soldiers.

=== Second campaign against Tantamani (663 BCE) ===
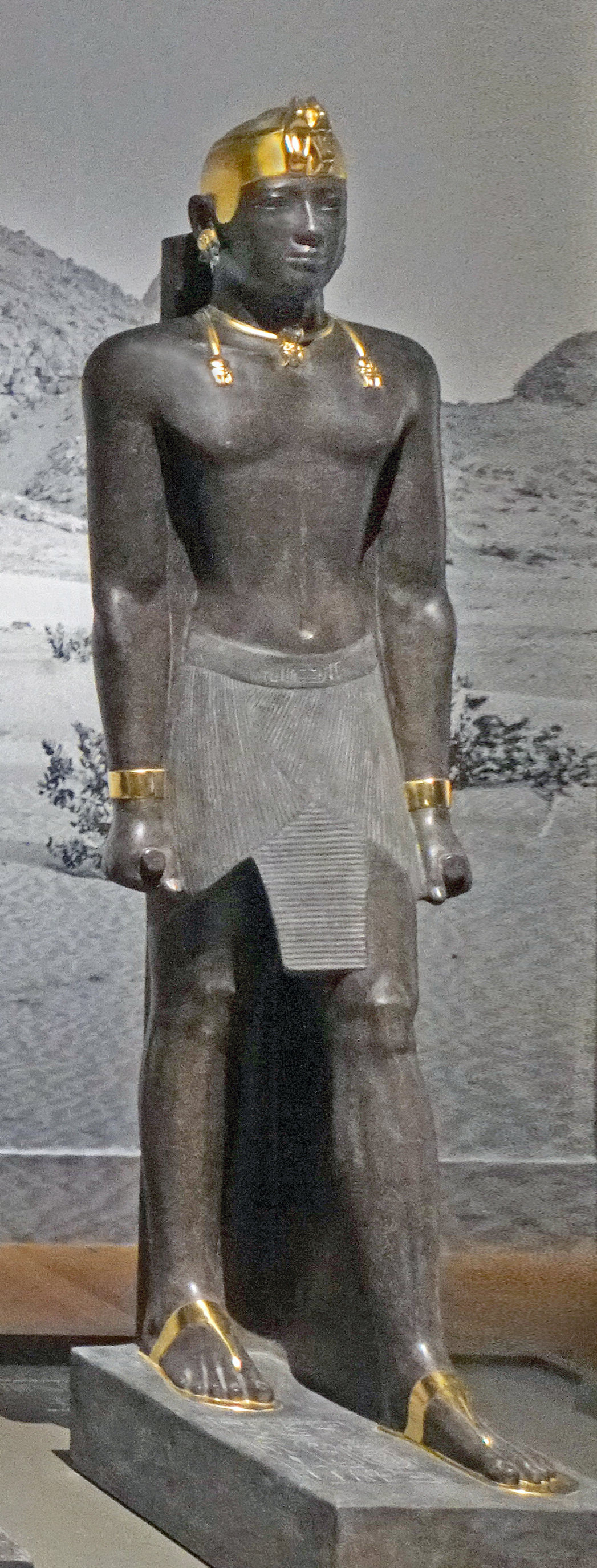
Statue of Kushite ruler and pharaoh of the 25th Dynasty Tantamani, Louvre Museum reconstruction.

Egypt was still seen as vulnerable, and Tantamani invaded Egypt in hopes of restoring his family to the throne. This led to a renewed conflict with Ashurbanipal in 663 BCE.

Once the Assyrians had appointed Necho I as king and left Egypt, Tantamani marched down the Nile from Nubia and reoccupied all of Egypt, including Memphis. Necho I, the Assyrians' representative, was killed in Tantamani's campaign.

In reaction, the Assyrians, led by Ashurbanipal, returned to Egypt in force. Together with Psamtik I's army, which comprised Carian mercenaries, they fought a pitched battle in north Memphis, close to the temple of Isis, between the Serapeum and Abusir. Tantamani was defeated and fled to Upper Egypt, but just 40 days after the battle, Ashurbanipal's army arrived in Thebes. Tantamani had already left the city for Kipkipi, a location that remains uncertain but might be Kom Ombo, some 200 km (120 mi) south of Thebes. The city itself was conquered ("smashed (as if by) a floodstorm") and heavily plundered in the Sack of Thebes. The event is not mentioned in Egyptian sources but is known from the Assyrian annals, which report that the inhabitants were deported. The Assyrians took a large booty of gold, silver, precious stones, clothes, horses, fantastic animals, as well as two obelisks covered in electrum weighing 2.500 talents (c. 75.5 tons, or 166,500 lb): Archaeologically, there is no positive evidence of destruction, plunder and major changes in Thebes. There are more signs of continuity than of disruption, with all the officials remaining in their offices, and development of tombs continuing without interruption.

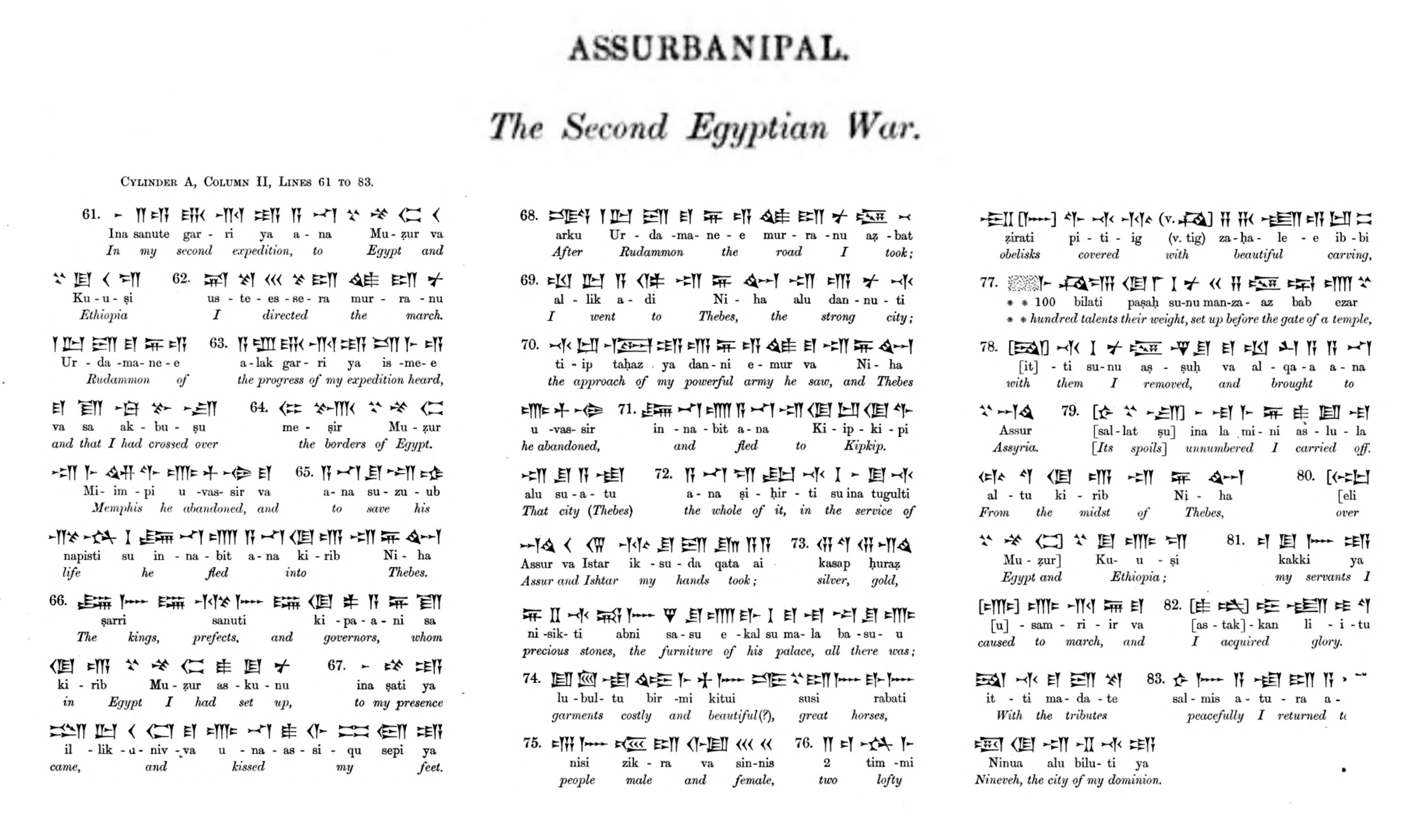
Ashurbanipal's Second Campaign in Egypt, in the Rassam cylinder

Capture of Memphis by the Assyrians.

This city, the whole of it, I conquered it with the help of Ashur and Ishtar. Silver, gold, precious stones, all the wealth of the palace, rich cloth, precious linen, great horses, supervising men and women, two obelisks of splendid electrum, weighing 2,500 talents, the doors of temples I tore from their bases and carried them off to Assyria. With this weighty booty, I left Thebes. Against Egypt and Kush, I have lifted my spear and shown my power. With full hands I have returned to Nineveh, in good health.

— Rassam cylinder of Ashurbanipal

The sack of Thebes was a momentous event that reverberated throughout the Ancient Near East. It is mentioned in the Book of Nahum chapter 3:8-10:

Art thou better than populous No, that was situate among the rivers, that had the waters round about it, whose rampart was the sea, and her wall was from the sea? Ethiopia and Egypt were her strength, and it was infinite; Put and Lubim were thy helpers. Yet was she carried away, she went into captivity: her young children also were dashed in pieces at the top of all the streets: and they cast lots for her honourable men, and all her great men were bound in chains.

A prophecy in the Book of Isaiah refers to the sack as well:

Just as my servant Isaiah has gone stripped and barefoot for three years, as a sign and portent against Egypt and Cush, so the king of Assyria will lead away stripped and barefoot the Egyptian captives and Cushite exiles, young and old, with buttocks bared—to Egypt's shame. Those who trusted in Cush and boasted in Egypt will be dismayed and put to shame.

The Assyrian reconquest effectively ended Nubian control over Egypt, although Tantamani's authority was still recognized in Upper Egypt until his 8th Year in 656 BCE, when Psamtik I's navy peacefully took control of Thebes and effectively unified all of Egypt. These events marked the start of the Twenty-sixth Dynasty of Egypt.

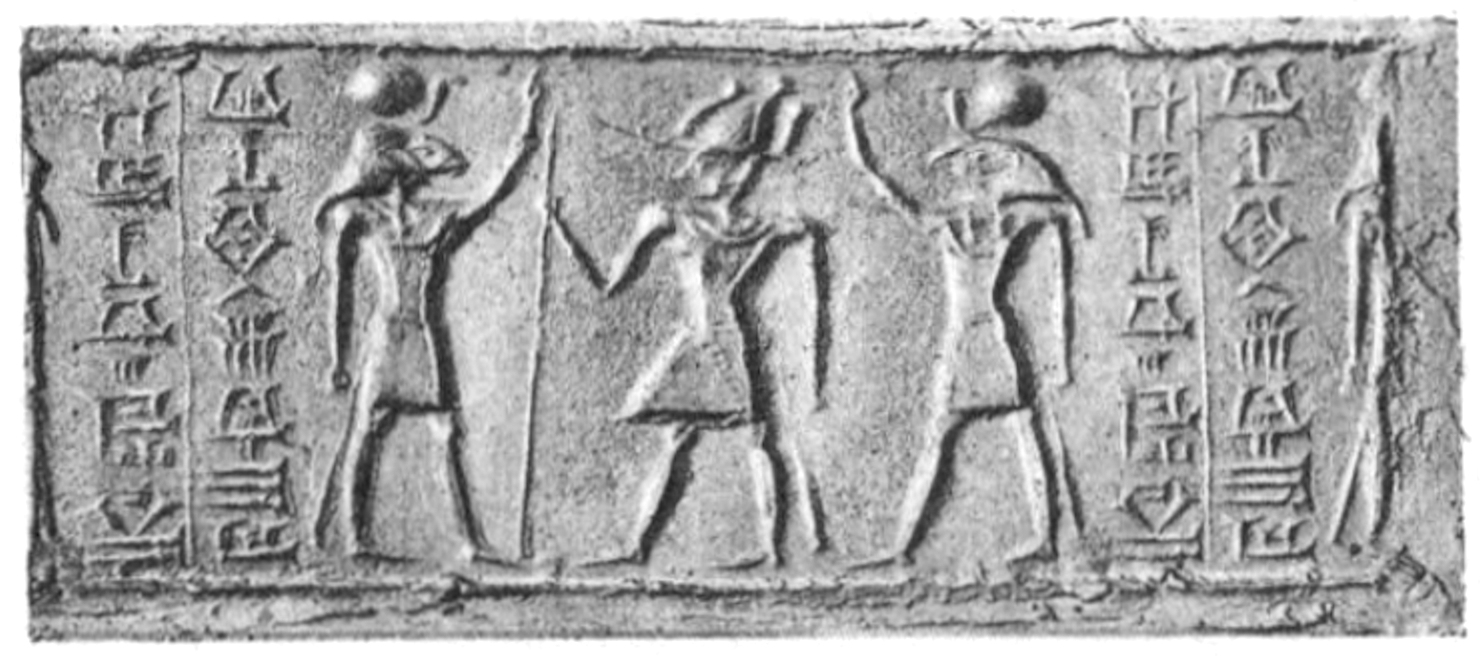
Egypto-Assyrian cylinder seal, combining the Assyrian cuneiform script with Egyptian deities

== Decline of the Neo-Assyrian Empire ==
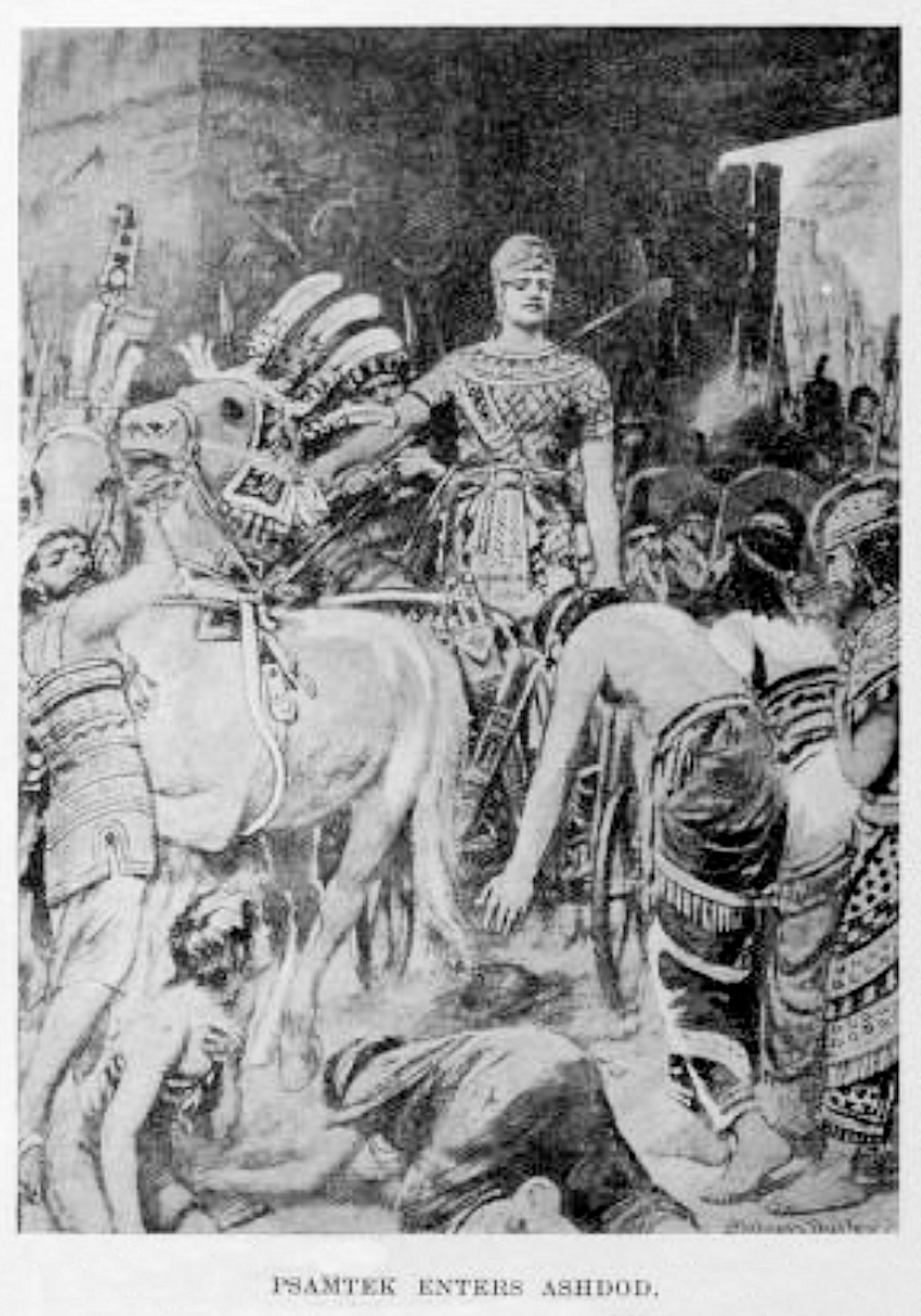
Egyptian ruler Psamtik I during the fall of Ashdod in 635 BCE, illustration by Patrick Gray, 1900.

The new Egyptian Dynasty, having been installed by the Assyrians, remained on friendly terms with them. But the Neo-Assyrian empire began to disintegrate rapidly after a series of bitter civil wars broke out involving a number of claimants to the throne. While the Neo-Assyrian Empire was preoccupied with revolts and civil war over control of the throne, Psamtik I threw off his ties to the Assyrians circa 655 BCE, and formed alliances with King Gyges of Lydia, and recruited mercenaries from Caria and ancient Greece to resist Assyrian attacks.

Assyria's vassal state of Babylonia took advantage of the upheavals in Assyria and rebelled under the previously unknown Nabopolassar, a member of the Chaldean tribe, in 625 BCE. What followed was a long war fought in the Babylonian heartland.

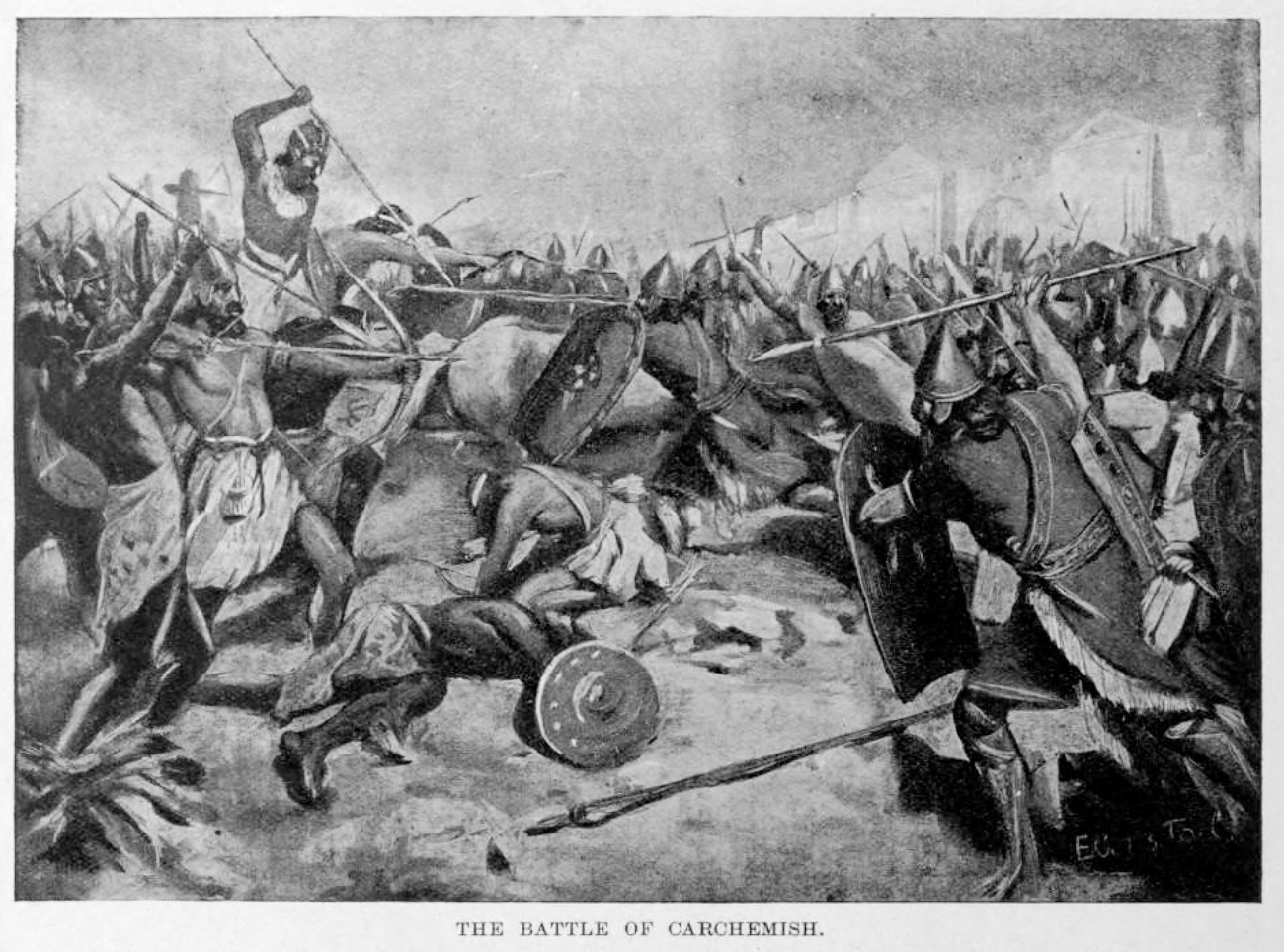
In 605 BCE, a last Egyptian force fought the Babylonians at the Battle of Carchemish, helped by the remnants of the army of former Assyria, but this too met with defeat.

A general called Ashur-uballit II was declared king of Assyria, and with belated military support from the Egyptian pharaoh Necho II, who wished to contain the westward advance of the Neo-Babylonian Empire, held out at Harran until 609 BCE. Egyptian aid continued to the Assyrians, who desperately attempted to curb the increasing power of the Babylonians and Medes.

In 609 BCE, at the Battle of Megiddo, an Egyptian force defeated a Judean force under king Josiah and managed to reach the last remnants of the Assyrian army. In a final battle at Harran in 609 BCE, the Babylonians and Medes defeated the Assyrian-Egyptian alliance, after which Assyria ceased to exist as an independent state. In 605 BCE, another Egyptian force fought the Babylonians (Battle of Carchemish), alongside what remained of the Assyrian army, but this was also met with defeat.

== Sources ==
- Ephʿal, Israel (2005). "Esarhaddon, Egypt, and Shubria: Politics and Propaganda". Journal of Cuneiform Studies. 57 (1). University of Chicago Press: 99–111. doi:10.1086/JCS40025994. S2CID 156663868.
- Frahm, Eckart (2017). "The Neo-Assyrian Period (ca. 1000–609 BCE)". In E. Frahm (ed.). A Companion to Assyria. Hoboken: John Wiley & Sons. ISBN 978-1-118-32524-7.
- Mark, Joshua J. (2009). "Ashurbanipal". Ancient History Encyclopedia.
- Mark, Joshua J. (2014). "Esarhaddon". Ancient History Encyclopedia.
- Radner, Karen (2003). "The Trials of Esarhaddon: The Conspiracy of 670 BC". ISIMU: Revista sobre Oriente Próximo y Egipto en la antigüedad. 6. Universidad Autónoma de Madrid: 165–183. doi:10.15366/isimu2003.6.009. hdl:10486/3476.
- Radner, Karen (2012). "After Eltekeh: Royal Hostages from Egypt at the Assyrian Court". Stories of long ago. Festschrift für Michael D. Roaf. Ugarit-Verlag: 471–479.
- Radner, Karen (2015). Ancient Assyria: A Very Short Introduction. Oxford University Press. ISBN 978-0-19-871590-0.
- Miller, Douglas B.; Shipp, R. Mark (1996). An Akkadian Handbook: Paradigms, Helps, Glossary, Logograms, and Sign List. Eisenbrauns. ISBN 0931464862.
- Kahn, Dan'el (2006). "The Assyrian Invasions of Egypt (673-663 B.C.) and the Final Expulsion of the Kushites". Studien zur Altägyptischen Kultur. 34: 251–267. JSTOR 25157757.
