= Nimrud Tablet K.3751 =

Clay tablet from Nimrud, Iraq (c.733 BC)

Nimrud Tablet K 3751
- Material: Clay
- Writing: Akkadian cuneiform
- Created: c. 733 BC
- Discovered: 1873; Nineveh, Iraq
- Discovered by: George Smith
- Present location: British Museum
- Identification: K 3751

The Nimrud Tablet K.3751, also known as Kalhu Palace Summary Inscription 7, is an inscription on a clay tablet dated c. 733 BC from the reign of Tiglath-Pileser III (745 to 727 BC), discovered by George Smith in 1873 in Nimrud (now in Iraq). The tablet describes the first 17 years of Tiglath-Pileser III's reign and was likely composed in or shortly after his 17th year. It contains the first known archeological reference to Judah (Yaudaya or KUR.ia-ú-da-a-a).

The text consists of 50 and 35 lines of inscription on the two main pieces. It is the most detailed of Tiglath-Pileser III's summary inscriptions, and it contains the only known complete building account of Tiglath-Pileser III from Nimrud.

Though it has the identification code K 3751, where K stands for Kouyunjik (usually the Library of Ashurbanipal), it was most probably actually discovered at Nimrud since it was inscribed by the excavators with "S.E. Palace Nimroud".

The most well known excerpt of the text, including the reference to king Ahaz (written in the inscription as Jeho-ahaz, his longer name) of Judah, as translated by the University of Pennsylvania's RINAP project (The Royal Inscriptions of the Neo-Assyrian Period), is as below:

"In all the (foreign) lands that ... [... I received the paymen]t of Kuštašpi of the land Kummuḫu, Urik(ki) of the land Que, Sibitti-biʾil of the city [Byblos, Hiram of the land Tyre, Pisīris of the city Carchemish, Ēnī]-il of the land Hamath, Panammû of the city Samʾal, Tarḫulara of the city Gurgum, Sulu[mal of the land Melid, Dadīlu of the city Kaska, U]assurme of the land Tabal, Ušḫitti of the city Tuna, Urballâ of the city Tuḫana, Tuḫam[mi of the city Ištunda, Urimmi of the city Ḫubišna, (rev. 10´) Ma]ttan-biʾil (Mattan-Baʾal) of the city Arvad, Sanīpu of the land Bīt-Ammon, Salāmānu of the land Moab, ...[... of ..., ... of ..., Mi]tinti of the land Ashkelon, Jehoahaz of the land Judah, Qauš-malaka of the land Edom, Muṣ...[... of ..., ... of ..., (and) Ḫa]nūnu of the city Gaza: gold, silver, tin, iron, lead, multicolored garments, linen garments, the garments of their lands, red-purple wool, [..., all kinds of] costly articles, produce of the sea (and) dry land, commodities of their lands, royal treasures, horses (and) mules broken to the yo[ke, ...]."
