= Rassam cylinder =

Cuneiform cylinder written by Neo-Assyrian king Ashurbanipal

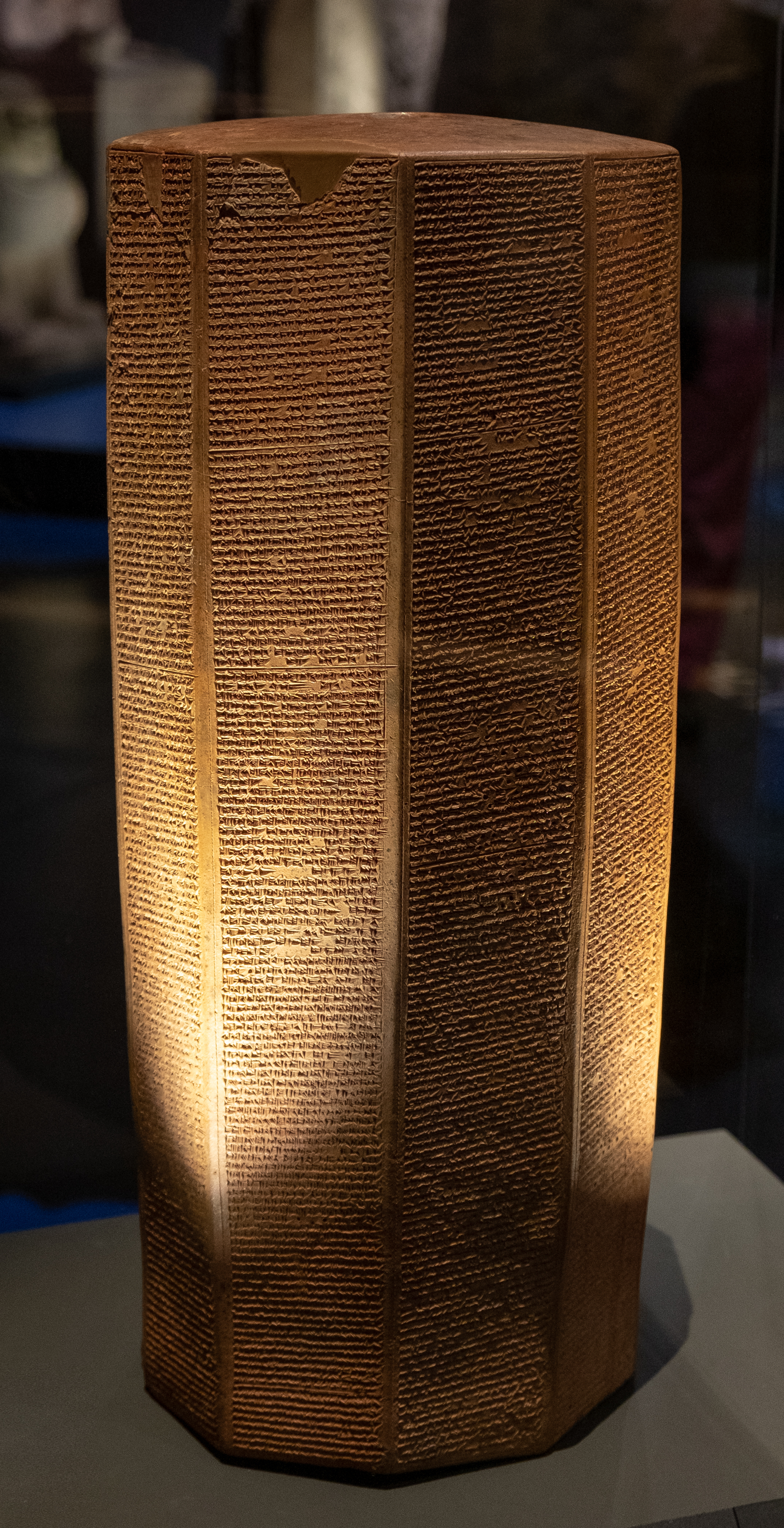
- Rassam cylinder of Ashurbanipal. A 10-sided prism and the most complete of the chronicles of Ashurbanipal. Nineveh, 643 BCE. British Museum.
- Created: 643 BCE
- Discovered: Nineveh; 36.359444°N 43.152778°E
- Present location: British Museum, London
- Registration: BM 91026

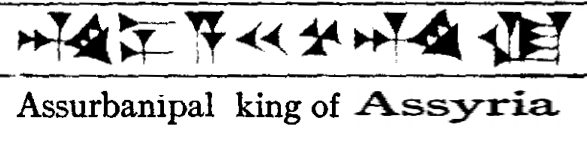
"Assurbanipal King of Assyria" an-szar2-du3-a man kur_ an-szar2{ki} in the Rassam cylinder, 643 BCE.

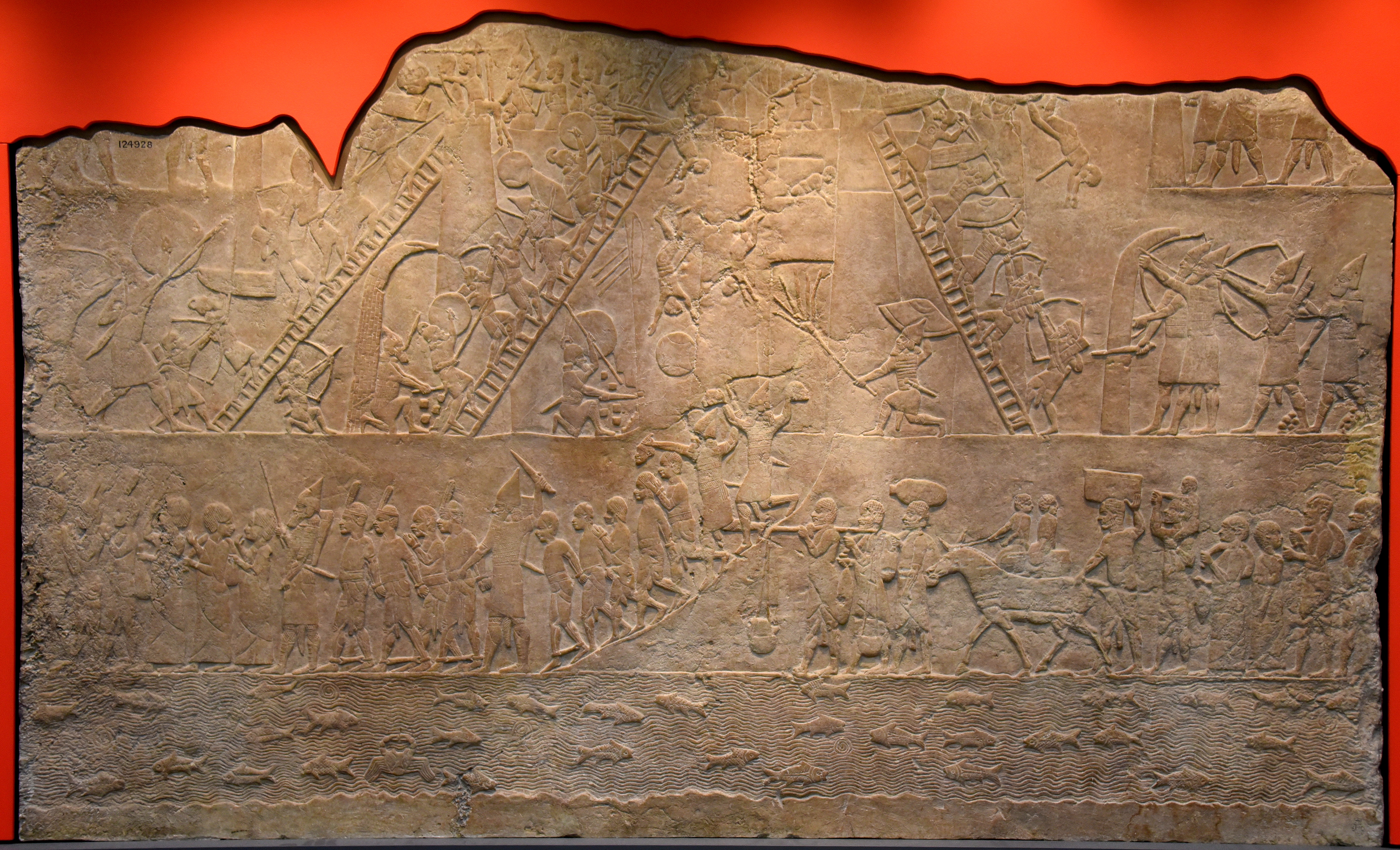
Assyrian siege of an Egyptian fort, probably a scene from the war in 667 BCE. Sculpted in 645 – 635 BCE, under Ashurbanipal. British Museum.

The Rassam cylinder is a cuneiform cylinder, forming a prism with ten faces, written by Neo-Assyrian king Ashurbanipal in 643 BCE. The 7th century BCE cylinder was discovered in the North Palace of Nineveh by Hormuzd Rassam in 1854, hence its name. It is located in the British Museum.

== Content ==
The cylinder describes in detail nine military campaigns of Ashurbanipal. The content of the cylinder has been listed as follows:

1. Introduction, account of the accession of Ashurbanipal
2. First Egyptian War against Tirhakah
3. Second Egyptian War against Urdamane
4. Conquest of Tyre and death of Ba'al, king of Tyre
5. Expedition against Ahseri, king of Van
6. Expedition against Teumman, king of Elam
7. War against Shamash-shum-ukin of Babylon, brother of Ashurbanipal
8. First war with Ummanaldas, king of Elam
9. Second war with Ummanaldas, king of Elam
10. Expedition against Uate, king of Arabia
11. Capture of Ummanaldas, king of Elam
12. Embassy from Istar-duri, king of Ararat
13. Repair of the Palace of Sennacherib at Nineveh, conclusion, and date of the inscription

== Extracts ==
One of these is his victorious campaign in Egypt:

In my first campaign I marched against Magan, Meluhha, Taharqa, king of Egypt and Ethiopia, whom Esarhaddon, king of Assyria, the father who begot me, had defeated, and whose land he brought under his sway. This same Taharqa forgot the might of Ashur, Ishtar and the other great gods, my lords, and put his trust upon his own power. He turned against the kings and regents whom my own father had appointed in Egypt. He entered and took residence in Memphis, the city which my own father had conquered and incorporated into Assyrian territory.

— Rassam cylinder of Assurbanipal (extract).

Some reliefs from Nineveh are otherwise known that illustrate these campaigns.

A full translation of the cylinder was made by Luckenbill in Ancient Records of Assyria and Babylonia. A full transcription of the cuneiform is available on CDLI.

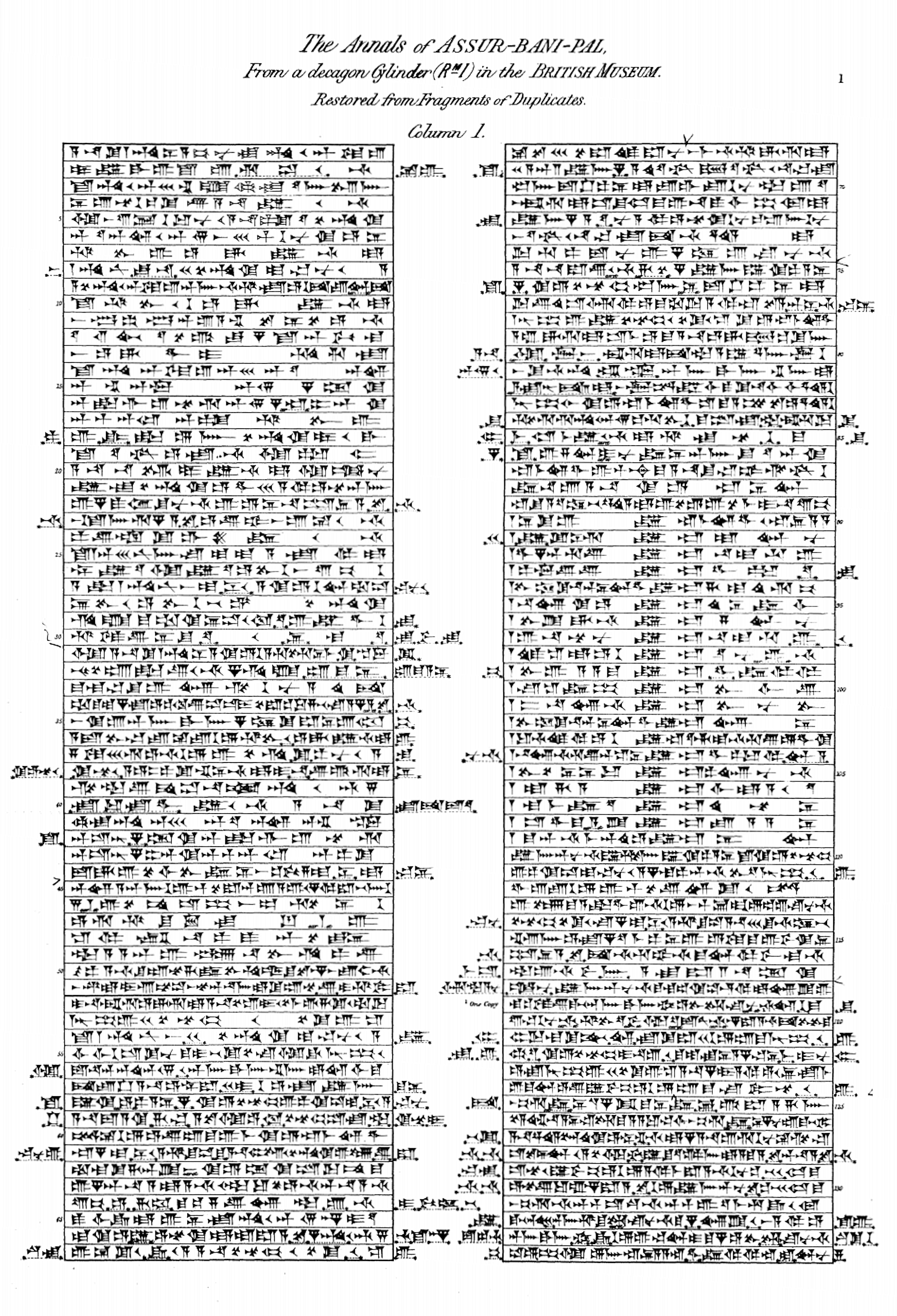
Transcription of the cuneiform script of the first column.

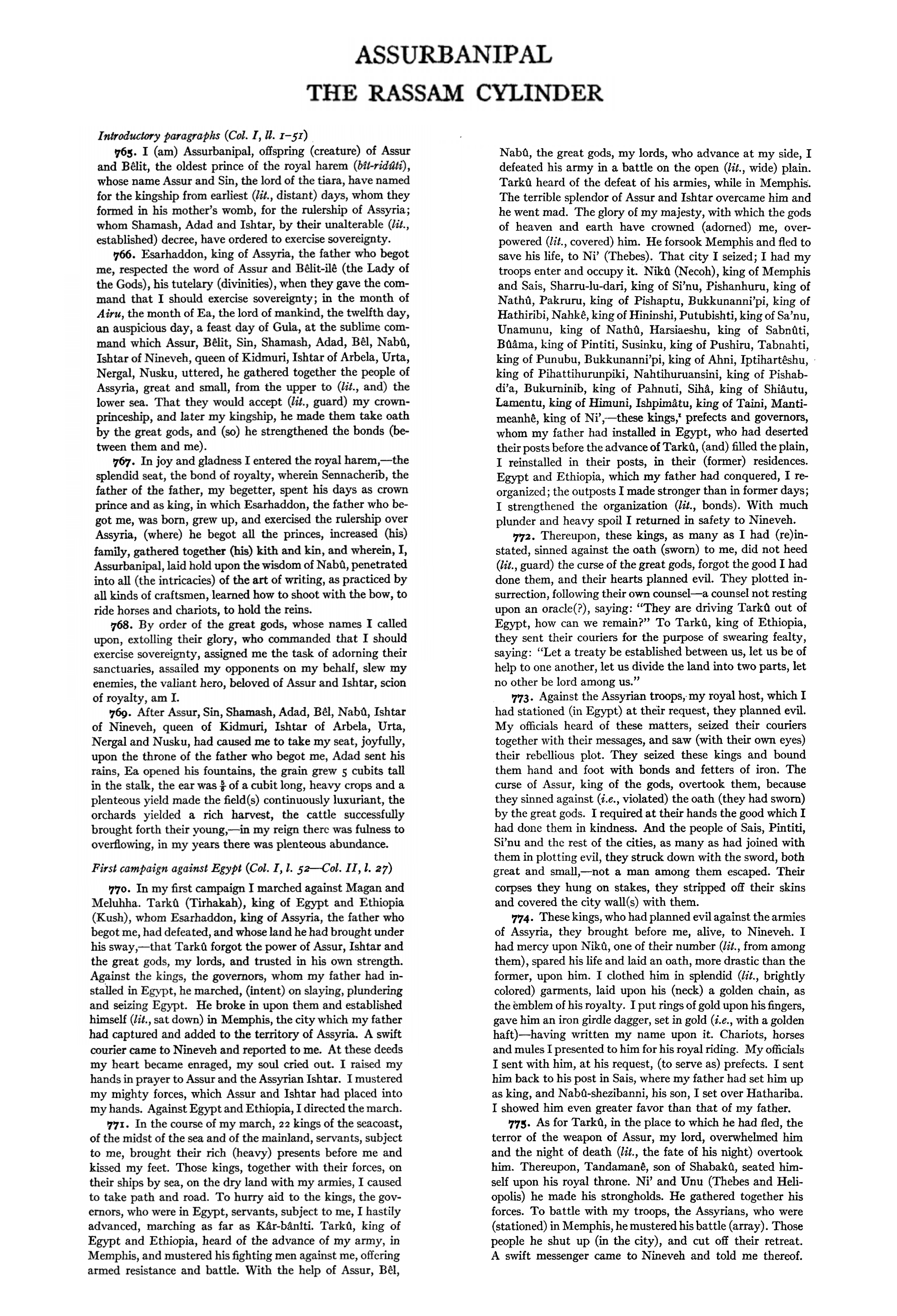
Translation of the first column by Luckenbill: Introduction and First Campaign of Egypt.

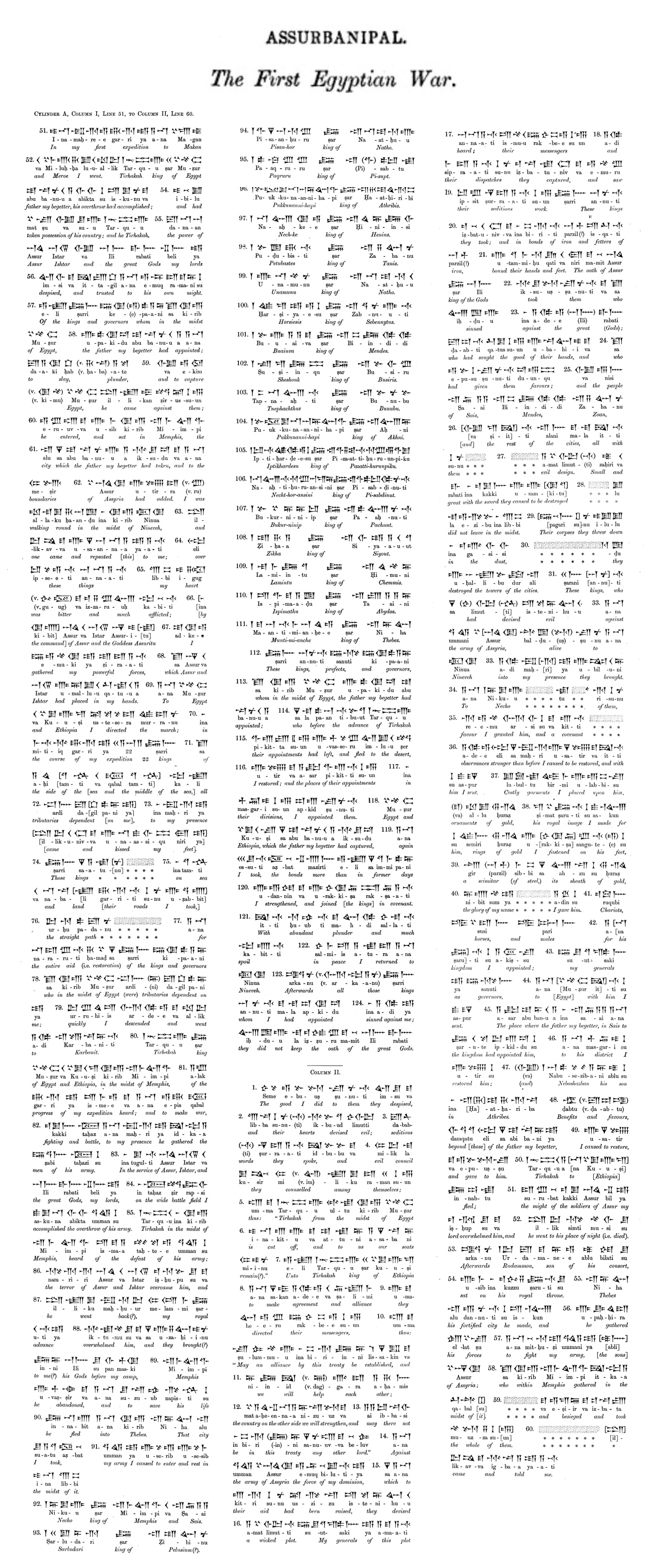
Ashurbanipal "The First Egyptian War". Word-for-word translation by George Smith.

== Important words ==
The word Mu-ṣur, for Egypt

The word Ku-u_{2}-si, for "Kingdom of Kush"

The word Sha-ba-ku-u, for Kushite Pharaoh Shabaka

The word Tar-qu-u_{2}, for Kushite Pharaoh Taharqa

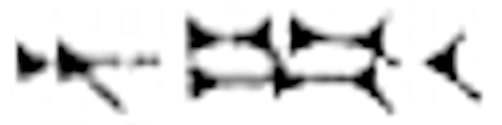
Tar-qu-u, an alternative spelling used for Kushite Pharaoh Taharqa

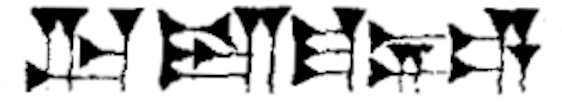
The word Urdamanee, for Kushite Pharaoh Tantamani

The word An-shar-pap-ash, for Neo-Assyrian ruler Esarhaddon

The word An-shar-du-a, for Neo-Assyrian ruler Ashurbanipal

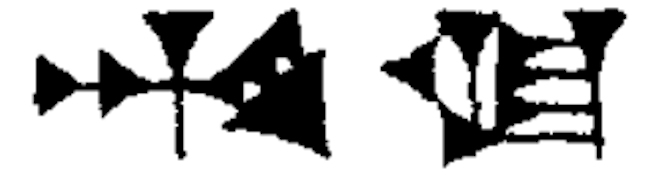
The word Aššur ^{KI}, for the city of Assur

The word mat Aššur ^{KI}, for the country of Aššur, Assyria

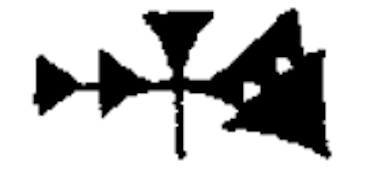
The word An-shar, for supreme god Anshar

The country of Meluhha (𒈨𒈛𒄩𒆠) possibly identical with Meroe
