= Daniel David Luckenbill =

Daniel David Luckenbill (Hamburg, Pennsylvania 21 June 1881 - London, 5 June 1927) was an American assyriologist and professor at the University of Chicago.

== Publications ==
=== Complete bibliography ===
- John A. Maynard: In Memoriam: A Bibliography of D. D. Luckenbill. In: The American Journal of Semitic Languages and Literatures. 45, 1929, S. 90–93. (JSTOR)
- A Study of the temple documents from the Cassite period. The Chicago University Press, Chicago 1907. Thesis PhD (Digitalisat, Internet Archive)
- Annals of Sennacherib. The Chicago University Press, Chicago 1924. Reprint 2005. (Digitalisat des Oriental Institute OIP2; PDF; 6,3 MB).
- Ancient Records of Assyria and Babylonia. The Chicago University Press, Chicago 1926/1927. Mehrfache Reprints.
  - Bd. 1 Historical records of Assyria: from the earliest times to Sargon.
  - Bd. 2 Historical records of Assyria: from Sargon to the end.
- Inscriptions of Adab. The Chicago University Press, Chicago 1930. (Digitalisat des Oriental Institute OIP14; PDF; 3,9 MB).

=== Beiträge ===
- The Temples of Babylonia and Assyria. In: The American Journal of Semitic Languages and Literatures. 24/4 1908, S. 291–322, (Auch: Sonderabdruck). (JSTOR).
- Inscriptions of Early Assyrian Rulers. In: The American Journal of Semitic Languages and Literatures. 28/3, 1912, S. 153–203 . (JSTOR).
- Hittite Treaties and Letters. In: The American Journal of Semitic Languages and Literatures. 37/3, 1921, S. 161–211. (JSTOR).
- Biblical standards of history, chronology, and statistics. In: The Truth about the Bible. American Institute of Sacred Literature, Chicago 1923.
- Leroy Waterman: Daniel David Luckenbill, 1881–1927: An Appreciation. In: The American Journal of Semitic Languages and Literatures. 44, 1927, S. 1–5. (obituary, JSTOR 528422).
