= 1 Chronicles 6 =

First Book of Chronicles, chapter 6

- ← chapter 5 chapter 7 →
- The complete Hebrew text of the Books of Chronicles (1 and 2 Chronicles) in the Leningrad Codex (1008 CE).
- Book: Books of Chronicles
- Category: Ketuvim
- Christian Bible part: Old Testament
- Order in the Christian part: 13

1 Chronicles 6 is the sixth chapter of the Books of Chronicles in the Hebrew Bible or the First Book of Chronicles in the Old Testament of the Christian Bible. The book is compiled from older sources by an unknown person or group, designated by modern scholars as "the Chronicler", and had the final shape established in late fifth or fourth century BCE. This chapter focuses on the tribe of Levi, divided into the line of the high priests (verses 1–15); the three lines of the families Gershom, Kohath, and Merari (verses 16–30); the lines of the musicians/singers (verses 31–47); duties of Levites and priests (verses 48–49); list of high priests (verses 50–53) and the Aaronites' and Levites' settlements (verses 54–81). It belongs to the section focusing on the list of genealogies from Adam to the lists of the people returning from exile in Babylon (1 Chronicles 1:1 to 9:34).

== Text ==
This chapter was originally written in the Hebrew language. It is divided into 81 verses in English Bibles, but only 66 verses in Hebrew Bible using a different verse numbering (see below).

=== Verse numbering ===
There are some differences in verse numbering of this chapter in English Bibles and Hebrew texts as follows:

Verse numbering for 1 Chronicles 5 and 6
English	Hebrew
6:1–15	5:27–41
6:16–81	6:1–66

This article generally follows the common numbering in Christian English Bible versions, with notes to the numbering in Hebrew Bible versions.

=== Textual witnesses ===
Some early manuscripts containing the text of this chapter in Hebrew are of the Masoretic Text tradition, which includes the Aleppo Codex (10th century), and Codex Leningradensis (1008).

There is also a translation into Koine Greek known as the Septuagint, made in the last few centuries BCE. Extant ancient manuscripts of the Septuagint version include Codex Vaticanus (B; $\mathfrak{G}$^{B}; 4th century), and Codex Alexandrinus (A; $\mathfrak{G}$^{A}; 5th century). (Note: The extant Codex Sinaiticus only contains 1 Chronicles 9:27–19:17.)

=== Old Testament references ===
- 1 Chronicles 6:1–4 (Hebrew: 5:27–30): 1 Chronicles 6:16, 18 (Hebrew: 6:1, 3); Genesis 46:11; Exodus 6:16, 18, 20, 23, 25; Numbers 3:17, 19, 20
- 1 Chronicles 6:16–19 (Hebrew: 6:1–4): Exodus 6:16–19; Numbers 3:17–20
- 1 Chronicles 6:22–23 (Hebrew: 6:7–8): 1 Chronicles 6:22; Exodus 6:24
- 1 Chronicles 6:24–28 (Hebrew: 6:9–13): 1 Chronicles 6:18–22
- 1 Chronicles 6:26–27 (Hebrew: 6:11–12): 1 Samuel 1:1
- 1 Chronicles 6:28 (Hebrew: 6:13): 1 Samuel 8:2
- 1 Chronicles 6:55–77 (Hebrew: 6:40–62): Joshua 21:11–34
- 1 Chronicles 6:80–81 (Hebrew: 6:65–66): Joshua 21:36–37

== Descendants of Levi (6:1–30; Hebrew: 5:27–6:15) ==
The genealogy of priestly tribe of Levi, apart from that of Judah, is longer than any of other tribes, showing the focus of the Chronicler on the temple and temple workers, preserved by David's line. The list first names Levi and his three sons, apparently taken from Genesis 46:11 (also Exodus 6:16; Numbers 26:57). Subsequently, three generations of the Kohathites, continuing with only the branches leading to famous siblings: Moses, Aaron and Miriam, then to the Aaronite high priests. Miriam's name is this list, because of her significance in history, which has parallels in the Torah (cf. for instance Exodus 6:16–25).

Verses 4–15 contain twenty-two successors of Aaron from the time of his death to the Babylonian exile, but the abridged version of the same list in Ezra 7:1–7 only has 15 names instead of 22. The list apparently serves as a legitimizing role, that the high priests in office during Chronicler's time could genealogically be traced back to Zadok and even further to Aaron, while omitting some names mentioned in other documents (such as Jehoiada, cf. 2 Chr 22:11–24:17). Omissions could be attributed to the confusion of the same names within the priestly families, such as recurrences of Amariah, Azariah and Zadok, leading to copyist errors. For examples, three Azariahs are listed here but one from the reign of Uzziah (2 Chronicles 26:20) and another from the reign of Hezekiah (2 Chronicles 31:10) are apparently overlooked. However, the narrative of the histories in the book and the writings of Josephus who provides a longer list (Antiquities 10:152-153) help to reconstruct a fairly complete genealogy. Two high-priests are given bits of narrative: Azariah son of Johanan "who served as priest in the house that Solomon built in Jerusalem" (verse 10) and Jehozadak son of Seraiah "who went into exile when the Lord sent Judah and Jerusalem into exile by the hand of Nebuchadnezzar" (vese 15), a witness to the destruction of Solomon's temple, therefore these two priests bracket the entire First Temple Period. The high-priestly lineage here ends with Jehozadak, but Nehemiah 12:10-11 continues where the list leaves off, with Joshua son of Jehozadak (cf. Haggai 1:1; 2:2, 4) and his line down to Jaddua II (born c. 420 BCE).

Verses 16–30 list the Levites' genealogy (cf. Numbers 3:17–35; cf. Exodus 6:16–25); verses 16–19 for the genealogy of Levi's sons (up to his grandchildren), whereas verses 20–30 contain the lines of Gershom, Kohath, and Merari, starting with their eldest sons and continuing vertically for seven generations.

=== Verse 1 ===
The sons of Levi; Gershon, Kohath, and Merari.

- Cross references: Genesis 46:11; Exodus 6:16; Numbers 26:57
- "Gershon": or "Gershom" in verse 16

=== Verse 15 ===
And Jehozadak went into captivity, when the Lord carried away Judah and Jerusalem by the hand of Nebuchadnezzar.

This is the most explicit mention of Judah's exile; 1 Chronicles 9:1; 2 Chronicles 36 only mention the exile of Jerusalem.

== Temple Musicians (6:31–48; Hebrew: 6:16–33) ==
This section focus on the genealogy of the temple singers whose roles are explained extensively in 1 Chronicles 15–16. Until the construction of the temple, they performed their duty before the tent of meeting. There was no relevant law of Moses for these roles. David appointed them (verse 31) and from Solomon's time onwards they sang in the temple. They are entrusted with "service of song in the house of the Lord" (verse 31) after the ark is installed inside there.

Three main singers are mentioned, representing three Levitical families, and familiar from the Psalms they contribute:

- Heman of Kohathites (verses 33–38), contributing Psalm 88
- Asaph of Gershonites (verses 39–43), contributing Psalms 50, 73–83
- Ethan of Merarites (verses 44–48), contributing Psalm 89

In addition, Psalms 42, 44–49, 84, 85, 87 and 88 are associated with the Korahites, a subgroup of the Kohathites to which Heman belonged (cf. the title of Psalm 88, Exodus 6:24; 2 Chronicles 20:19). Heman is significantly noted as the leader among the three "with his brothers, Asaph and Ethan, standing to his right and left" (cf. Numbers 4:1–4 for Kohathites' preeminence).

=== Verse 48 ===
And their brothers the Levites were appointed for all the service of the tabernacle of the house of God.

This depicts a "traditional view of priestly institution" that the Levites have responsibilities for everything related to the temple, except for three tasks assigned to priests descended from Aaron (verse 49).

== Descendants of Aaron (6:49–53; Hebrew: 6:34–38) ==
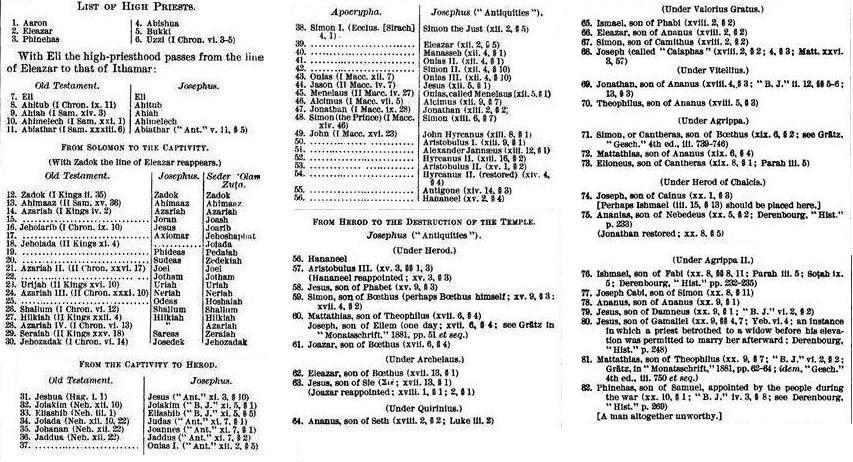
A traditional list of the Jewish high priests, starting with Aaron

This section lists only the Aaronid priests until Zadok and his son, Ahimaaz, in the time of David.

=== Verse 49 ===
But Aaron and his sons offered upon the altar of the burnt offering, and on the altar of incense, and were appointed for all the work of the place most holy, and to make an atonement for Israel, according to all that Moses the servant of God had commanded.

Three tasks are specifically assigned to the priests descended from Aaron:

- burnt offerings
- incense offerings
- all the work of the "holy of holies".

=== Genetic studies on descendants of Aaron ===
A present-day Jewish priestly caste known as Kohanim (singular "Kohen", also spelled "Cohen") claims to be the direct descendants of Aaron. Genetic studies on the members of this group reveals that a majority of them share a pattern of values for six Y-STR markers, which researchers named the Cohen Modal Haplotype (CMH). Subsequent research using twelve Y-STR markers indicated that about half of contemporary Jewish Kohanim shared Y-chromosomal J1 M267, also called J1c3. Molecular phylogenetics research published in 2013, 2016, and 2020 for haplogroup J1 (J-M267) yield a hypothetical most recent common ancestor of the Kohanim, named Y-chromosomal Aaron with age estimate 2,638–3,280 years Before Present (yBP) within subhaplogroup Z18271.

Following the findings, similar investigation was made of men who identify as Levites, because Aaron is recorded in Hebrew Bible as a descendant of Levi, son of Jacob. The 2003 Behar et al. investigation of Levites found high frequencies of multiple distinct markers, suggestive of multiple origins for the majority of non-Aaronid Levite families, although one marker presents in more than 50% of Eastern European (Ashkenazi) Jewish Levites, indicating a common male ancestor or very few male ancestors within the last 2000 years for many Levites of the Ashkenazi community. Subsequent publication by Rootsi, Behar, et al. in Nature Communications in December 2013 determined that among a set of 19 unique nucleotide substitutions defining the Ashkenazi R1a lineage, the M582 mutation is not found among Eastern Europeans, but the marker was present "in all sampled R1a Ashkenazi Levites, as well as in 33.8% of other R1a Ashkenazi Jewish males, and 5.9% of 303 R1a Near Eastern males, where it shows considerably higher diversity." Therefore, Rootsi, Behar, et al., concluded that this marker most likely originates in the pre-Diasporic Hebrews in the Near East.

The Samaritan community in the Middle East maintained that the priests within the group, called "Samaritan Kohanim", also of the line of Aaron/Levi. Samaritans claim that the southern tribes of the House of Judah left the original worship as set forth by Joshua, and the schism took place in the twelfth century BC at the time of Eli. A 2004 Y-Chromosome study concluded that the Samaritan Kohanim belong to haplogroup E-M35, indicating a different patrilineal family line than the Jewish Kohanim.

== Dwelling Places of the Levites (6:54–81; Hebrew: 6:39–66) ==
This section contains the list of living and grazing areas for the Levites, corresponding to that in Joshua 21:9–42, with some differences in the arrangement of its elements. The purpose is to show the areas where Levites actually settled among those designated in Joshua 21. The tribe of Levi was not given allotment of land because they are dedicated to God (Joshua 14:4), so the Chronicler clearly lists the cities where they were to settle.

== See also ==
- Chronology of the Bible
- High Priest of Israel
- Levite
- List of High Priests of Israel
- Seder Olam Zutta
- Related Bible parts: Genesis 46, Exodus 6, Number 3, Numbers 26, Joshua 21, Judges 2, Judges 12, 2 Kings 15, 2 Kings 16, 2 Kings 17, 2 Kings 18, 2 Chronicles 28

== Sources ==
- Ackroyd, Peter R (1993). "Chronicles, Books of". In Metzger, Bruce M; Coogan, Michael D (eds.). The Oxford Companion to the Bible. Oxford University Press. pp. 113–116. ISBN 978-0-19-504645-8.
- Bennett, William (2018). The Expositor's Bible: The Books of Chronicles. Litres. ISBN 978-5-04-082519-6.
- Coogan, Michael David (2007). Coogan, Michael David; Brettler, Marc Zvi; Newsom, Carol Ann; Perkins, Pheme (eds.). The New Oxford Annotated Bible with the Apocryphal/Deuterocanonical Books: New Revised Standard Version, Issue 48 (Augmented 3rd ed.). Oxford University Press. ISBN 978-0-19-528881-0.
- Endres, John C. (2012). First and Second Chronicles. Liturgical Press. ISBN 978-0-8146-2844-7.
- Gilbert, Henry L (1897). "The Forms of the Names in 1 Chronicles 1-7 Compared with Those in Parallel Passages of the Old Testament". The American Journal of Semitic Languages and Literatures. 13 (4). Liturgical Press: 279–298. doi:10.1086/369250. JSTOR 527992. S2CID 171072759.
- Hill, Andrew E. (2003). First and Second Chronicles. Zondervan. ISBN 978-0-310-20610-1.
- Mabie, Frederick (2017). "I. The Chronicler's Genealogical Survey of All Israel". In Longman III, Tremper; Garland, David E (eds.). 1 and 2 Chronicles. The Expositor's Bible Commentary. Zondervan. pp. 267–308. ISBN 978-0-310-53181-4.
- Mathys, H. P. (2007). "14. 1 and 2 Chronicles". In Barton, John; Muddiman, John (eds.). The Oxford Bible Commentary (first (paperback) ed.). Oxford University Press. pp. 267–308. ISBN 978-0-19-927718-6.
- Throntveit, Mark A. (2003). "Was the Chronicler a Spin Doctor? David in the Books of Chronicles". Word & World. 23 (4): 374–381.
- Tuell, Steven S. (2012). First and Second Chronicles. Westminster John Knox Press. ISBN 978-0-664-23865-0.
- Ulrich, Eugene, ed. (2010). The Biblical Qumran Scrolls: Transcriptions and Textual Variants. Brill.
- Würthwein, Ernst (1995). The Text of the Old Testament. Translated by Rhodes, Erroll F. Grand Rapids, MI: William B. Eerdmans. ISBN 0-8028-0788-7.
