= 1 Chronicles 5 =

First Book of Chronicles, chapter 5

- ← chapter 4 chapter 6 →
- The complete Hebrew text of the Books of Chronicles (1 and 2 Chronicles) in the Leningrad Codex (1008 CE).
- Book: Books of Chronicles
- Category: Ketuvim
- Christian Bible part: Old Testament
- Order in the Christian part: 13

1 Chronicles 5 is the fifth chapter of the Books of Chronicles in the Hebrew Bible or the First Book of Chronicles in the Old Testament of the Christian Bible. The book is compiled from older sources by an unknown person or group, designated by modern scholars as "the Chronicler", and had the final shape established in late fifth or fourth century BCE. This chapter focuses on the Transjordanian tribes, geographically from south to north: Reuben (verses 1–10), Gad (verses 11–17) and the half tribe of Manasseh (verses 23–24), as well as the account of the war against the Hagrites (verses 10, 18–22) and the reasoning why Transjordanian tribes were taken away into exile (verses 25–26). It belongs to the section focusing on the list of genealogies from Adam to the lists of the people returning from exile in Babylon (1 Chronicles 1:1 to 9:34).

== Text ==
This chapter was originally written in the Hebrew language. It is divided into 26 verses in English Bibles, but counted to 41 verses in Hebrew Bible using a different verse numbering (see below).

=== Verse numbering ===
There are some differences in verse numbering of this chapter in English Bibles and Hebrew texts as follows:

Verse numbering for 1 Chronicles 5 and 6
English	Hebrew
6:1–15	5:27–41
6:16–81	6:1–66

This article generally follows the common numbering in Christian English Bible versions, with notes to the numbering in Hebrew Bible versions.

=== Textual witnesses ===
Some early manuscripts containing the text of this chapter in Hebrew are of the Masoretic Text tradition, which includes the Aleppo Codex (10th century), and Codex Leningradensis (1008).

There is also a translation into Koine Greek known as the Septuagint, made in the last few centuries BCE. Extant ancient manuscripts of the Septuagint version include Codex Vaticanus (B; $\mathfrak{G}$^{B}; 4th century), and Codex Alexandrinus (A; $\mathfrak{G}$^{A}; 5th century). (Note: The extant Codex Sinaiticus only contains 1 Chronicles 9:27–19:17.)

=== Old Testament references ===
- 1 Chronicles 5:1–3: Genesis 46:8–9; Exodus 6:14; Numbers 26:5–9

== Structure ==
The whole chapter belongs to an arrangement comprising 1 Chronicles 2:3–8:40 with the king-producing tribes of Judah (David; 2:3–4:43) and Benjamin (Saul; 8:1–40) bracketing the series of lists as the priestly tribe of Levi (6:1–81) anchors the center, in the following order:

A David's royal tribe of Judah (2:3–4:43)

B Northern tribes east of Jordan (5:1–26)

X The priestly tribe of Levi (6:1–81)

B' Northern tribes west of Jordan (7:1–40)

A' Saul's royal tribe of Benjamin (8:1–40)

== Descendants of Reuben (5:1–10) ==
This section begins with explanation (a kind of midrash) that Reuben did not receive the rights of a firstborn son of Jacob because he slept with Bilhah, his father's concubine (Genesis 35:22; cf. 49:3–4). The firstborn rights were passed on to the two sons of Joseph, whereas the leadership was given to Judah (underlined in verse 2 and reflected in its prominence in the lists of tribes themselves) with an unnamed "chief ruler" (certainly pointing to David). Reuben's four sons are only named in verse 4.

=== Verse 1 ===
Now the sons of Reuben the firstborn of Israel—he was indeed the firstborn, but because he defiled his father's bed, his birthright was given to the sons of Joseph, the son of Israel, so that the genealogy is not listed according to the birthright;

- Cross references: Genesis 35:22; 49:3–4
- "Given to the sons of Joseph": Some ancient Hebrew manuscripts, the Syriac and Arabic translations read "to Joseph". This transfer of primogeniture rights refers to Jacob's curse (to Reuben, Jacob's biological firstborn) that the special blessing was given to Joseph (Genesis 49:22-26) and of his two sons (representing two parts of inheritance for the firstborn; Genesis 48:15-20), where Ephraim later emerges as the leading tribe of the two (Judges 2:9; Judges 4:5; Judges 5:14; Judges 8:1-2; Judges 12:1; Judges 12:15).

=== Verse 2 ===
For Judah prevailed above his brethren, and of him came the chief ruler; but the birthright was Joseph's:).

- "The chief ruler": literally "[to be] prince" (Hebrew: לְנָגִ֖יד, lə-nā-ḡîḏ), an apparent reference to David (1 Samuel 13:14), which was from the tribe of Judah, but later also alluded by the apostolic writer of the Epistle to the Hebrews for Jesus Christ: "It is evident that our Lord sprang out of Judah" (Hebrews 7:14).
- "Birthright": or "the right of the firstborn", was Joseph's, who received the "double portion" in the land portions of Ephraim and Manasseh, his sons.

=== Verse 6 ===
Beerah his son, whom Tilgathpilneser king of Assyria carried away captive: he was prince of the Reubenites.

- "Tiglath-Pilneser" (תלגת פלנאסר): this form of the name is always used in the Books of Chronicles (also in 2 Chronicles 28:20; 1 Chronicles 5:26 has תלגת פלנסר) for "Tilgath-Pileser" (תלגת פלאסר as used in 2 Kings 15:29; 16:10 or תלגת פלסר in 2 Kings 16:7).

== Descendants of Gad (5:11–17) ==
This section focuses on the tribe of Gad, which settled in the area east of the Jordan river ("Transjordan"), along with the tribes of Reuben and Manasseh (half of the tribe). The close relationship among these tribes is noted in Numbers 32:20–42; Joshua 13:8–33; 1 Chronicles 5:18–22, 26. The sources of the genealogies of the descendants of Gad are the documents compiled during the reign of Jotham, King of Judah (c. 750–735 BCE), and Jeroboam, King of Israel (c. 793–753 BCE), that bear no resemblance to other parts of the Bible (cf. Genesis 46:16; Numbers 26:15).

=== Verse 16 ===
And they dwelt in Gilead in Bashan, and in her towns, and in all the suburbs of Sharon, upon their borders.

- "Suburbs" (מִגְרְשֵׁ֥י, miḡ-rə-šê): "pasturelands" (ESV, NASB, NIV, etc.), "common-lands" or "open lands" (NKJV).
- "Sharon": is not the same area as the identically named plain south of Carmel, but a Transjordanian region (its precise position uncertain), which is also mentioned on the inscription of Mesha, king of Moab (line 13; dated around 830–810 BCE).

== The war against the Hagrites (5:18–22) ==
This section elaborates the conflict against the Hagrites (descendants of Hagar) during the reign of Saul, as briefly mentioned in verse 10 (also in Psalm 83:7, where the group was mentioned along with Edom, Ishmael, and Moab), over pastureland.

== Descendants of Manasseh (5:23–24) ==
This section focuses on the half-tribe of Manasseh, which settled in the area east of the Jordan river ("Transjordan"), along with the tribes of Reuben and Gad. The close relationship among these tribes is noted in Numbers 32:20–42; Joshua 13:8–33; 1 Chronicles 5:18–22, 26.

== The exile of Transjordanian tribes (5:25–26) ==
This passage combines the two-phases of the northern Israel kingdom (2 Kings 15:29 and 2 Kings 17:6; 18:11) into a single exile of the Transjordanian tribes, by taking the name of the king from the first, whilst using the deportation place-names of the second phase. Historical documents only record that Tiglath-pileser conquered Gilead in the east of Jordan.

=== Verse 26 ===
And the God of Israel stirred up the spirit of Pul king of Assyria, and the spirit of Tilgathpilneser king of Assyria, and he carried them away, even the Reubenites, and the Gadites, and the half tribe of Manasseh, and brought them unto Halah, and Habor, and Hara, and to the river Gozan, unto this day.

- "The spirit of Pul king of Assyria, and the spirit of Tilgathpilneser king of Assyria": also translated as "the spirit of Pul, king of Assyria, that is, the spirit of Tilgath-pilneser king of Assyria" (NASB). In 2 Kings 15:19, the Assyrian king is called Pul (as in late-Babylonian sources) and then in 2 Kings 15:29 (also in 2 Kings 16:7, 10) as Tiglath-pileser (written as "Tiglath-Pilneser" in 1 Chronicles 5:6, 26 and 2 Chronicles 28:20).

== See also ==
- Chronology of the Bible
- Hagar
- Related Bible parts: Genesis 46, Exodus 6, Numbers 3, Numbers 26, Judges 2, Judges 12, 2 Kings 15, 2 Kings 16, 2 Kings 17, 2 Kings 18, 2 Chronicles 28

== Sources ==
- Ackroyd, Peter R (1993). "Chronicles, Books of". In Metzger, Bruce M; Coogan, Michael D (eds.). The Oxford Companion to the Bible. Oxford University Press. pp. 113–116. ISBN 978-0195046458.
- Bennett, William (2018). The Expositor's Bible: The Books of Chronicles. Litres. ISBN 978-5040825196.
- Coogan, Michael David (2007). Coogan, Michael David; Brettler, Marc Zvi; Newsom, Carol Ann; Perkins, Pheme (eds.). The New Oxford Annotated Bible with the Apocryphal/Deuterocanonical Books: New Revised Standard Version, Issue 48 (Augmented 3rd ed.). Oxford University Press. ISBN 9780195288810.
- Endres, John C. (2012). First and Second Chronicles. Liturgical Press. ISBN 9780814628447.
- Gilbert, Henry L (1897). "The Forms of the Names in 1 Chronicles 1-7 Compared with Those in Parallel Passages of the Old Testament". The American Journal of Semitic Languages and Literatures. 13 (4). Liturgical Press: 279–298. doi:10.1086/369250. JSTOR 527992.
- Hill, Andrew E. (2003). First and Second Chronicles. Zondervan. ISBN 9780310206101.
- Mabie, Frederick (2017). "I. The Chronicler's Genealogical Survey of All Israel". In Longman III, Tremper; Garland, David E (eds.). 1 and 2 Chronicles. The Expositor's Bible Commentary. Zondervan. pp. 267–308. ISBN 978-0310531814.
- Mathys, H. P. (2007). "14. 1 and 2 Chronicles". In Barton, John; Muddiman, John (eds.). The Oxford Bible Commentary (first (paperback) ed.). Oxford University Press. pp. 267–308. ISBN 978-0199277186.
- Throntveit, Mark A. (2003). "Was the Chronicler a Spin Doctor? David in the Books of Chronicles". Word & World. 23 (4): 374–381.
- Tuell, Steven S. (2012). First and Second Chronicles. Westminster John Knox Press. ISBN 978-0664238650.
- Ulrich, Eugene, ed. (2010). The Biblical Qumran Scrolls: Transcriptions and Textual Variants. Brill.
- Würthwein, Ernst (1995). The Text of the Old Testament. Translated by Rhodes, Erroll F. Grand Rapids, MI: William B. Eerdmans. ISBN 0-8028-0788-7.
