= 2 Chronicles 26 =

Second Book of Chronicles, chapter 26

- ← chapter 25 chapter 27 →
- The complete Hebrew text of the Books of Chronicles (1st and 2nd Chronicles) in the Leningrad Codex (1008 CE).
- Book: Books of Chronicles
- Category: Ketuvim
- Christian Bible part: Old Testament
- Order in the Christian part: 14

2 Chronicles 26 is the twenty-sixth chapter of the Second Book of Chronicles the Old Testament in the Christian Bible or of the second part of the Books of Chronicles in the Hebrew Bible. The book is compiled from older sources by an unknown person or group, designated by modern scholars as "the Chronicler", and had the final shape established in late fifth or fourth century BCE. This chapter belongs to the section focusing on the kingdom of Judah until its destruction by the Babylonians under Nebuchadnezzar and the beginning of restoration under Cyrus the Great of Persia (2 Chronicles 10 to 36). The focus of this chapter is the reign of Uzziah, king of Judah.

== Text ==
This chapter was originally written in the Hebrew language and is divided into 23 verses.

=== Textual witnesses ===
Some early manuscripts containing the text of this chapter in Hebrew are of the Masoretic Text tradition, which includes the Aleppo Codex (10th century (Note: Since 1947 the current text of Aleppo Codex is missing 2 Chronicles 26:19–35:7.)), and Codex Leningradensis (1008).

There is also a translation into Koine Greek known as the Septuagint, made in the last few centuries BCE. Extant ancient manuscripts of the Septuagint version include Codex Vaticanus (B; $\mathfrak{G}$^{B}; 4th century), and Codex Alexandrinus (A; $\mathfrak{G}$^{A}; 5th century). (Note: The whole book of 2 Chronicles is missing from the extant Codex Sinaiticus.)

=== Old Testament references ===
- 2 Chronicles 26:1–23: 2 Kings 14:21–22; 2 Kings 15:1–7

== Uzziah, king of Judah (26:1–15) ==
Like some kings of Judah before him, Uzziah's reign could be divided into two periods: one positive (Uzziah's successes as a result of seeking God) and one negative (Uzziah's illness caused by his disobedience as described in verses 16–21. The Chronicles portray Uzziah as a major reformer whose fame reached Egypt and detail his wars, construction projects, agriculture and military organization, whereas 2 Kings 14:21–2; 15:1–7 which only report the fortification and conquest of Elath as well as Uzziah's illness.

=== Verse 3 ===
Uzziah was sixteen years old when he began to reign, and he reigned fifty-two years in Jerusalem. His mother's name was Jecoliah of Jerusalem.

- Cross references: 2 Kings 15:2
- "Fifty-two years": in Thiele's chronology Uzziah first reigned as a co-regent (while his father, Amaziah, was in exile) in September 791 BCE, then became the 10th king of Judah between April and September 767 BCE then died between April and September 739 BCE. Only Manasseh has longer period of reign in the kingdom of Judah than Uzziah.

=== Verse 5 ===
And he sought God in the days of Zechariah, who had understanding in the visions of God: and as long as he sought the Lord, God made him to prosper.

- "Zechariah": (without a title) taught Uzziah 'to seek God' (NRSV: 'in the fear of God'), a positive attitude towards YHWH which resulted in 'God made him prosper', and as long as he lived, Uzziah behaved well (similar to Joash, who fell away only after the death of the priest Jehoiada). Uzziah is named in the book of Zechariah (Zechariah 14:5), and a Zechariah is mentioned in Isaiah 8:2.

=== Verse 10 ===
Also he built towers in the desert. He dug many wells, for he had much livestock, both in the lowlands and in the plains; he also had farmers and vinedressers in the mountains and in Carmel, for he loved the soil.

Archaeological evidence supports the record of Uzziah's building projects in the south, although it could also point to the time of Jehoshaphat or other kings.

- "Carmel": or "the fertile fields."

== Uzziah’s disease (26:16–23) ==
In the latter period of his reign, Uzziah grew proud and attempted to burn incense, which could only be performed by the priests. When the priests warned him, Uzziah became angry to them, but the king was immediately smitten with leprosy, so he had to live in a separate house from then on and his son, Jotham, ruled as regent.

=== Verse 23 ===
So Uzziah slept with his fathers, and they buried him with his fathers in the field of the burial which belonged to the kings; for they said, He is a leper: and Jotham his son reigned in his stead.

- Cross references: 2 Kings 15:7
- "Slept with his fathers": or "died and joined his ancestors."

== See also ==
- Amaziah
- Ashdod
- Censer
- Eloth
- Isaiah
- Jotham
- Jerusalem
- Leprosy
- Moses
- Tzaraath
- Related Bible parts: 2 Kings 14, 2 Kings 15, 2 Chronicles 25, Isaiah 6, Zechariah 14

== Sources ==
- Ackroyd, Peter R (1993). "Chronicles, Books of". In Metzger, Bruce M; Coogan, Michael D (eds.). The Oxford Companion to the Bible. Oxford University Press. pp. 113–116. ISBN 978-0195046458.
- Bennett, William (2018). The Expositor's Bible: The Books of Chronicles. Litres. ISBN 978-5040825196.
- Coogan, Michael David (2007). Coogan, Michael David; Brettler, Marc Zvi; Newsom, Carol Ann; Perkins, Pheme (eds.). The New Oxford Annotated Bible with the Apocryphal/Deuterocanonical Books: New Revised Standard Version, Issue 48 (Augmented 3rd ed.). Oxford University Press. ISBN 9780195288810.
- Mabie, Frederick (2017). "I. The Chronicler's Genealogical Survey of All Israel". In Longman III, Tremper; Garland, David E (eds.). 1 and 2 Chronicles. The Expositor's Bible Commentary. Zondervan. pp. 267–308. ISBN 978-0310531814.
- Mathys, H. P. (2007). "14. 1 and 2 Chronicles". In Barton, John; Muddiman, John (eds.). The Oxford Bible Commentary (first (paperback) ed.). Oxford University Press. pp. 267–308. ISBN 978-0199277186.
- McFall, Leslie (1991), "Translation Guide to the Chronological Data in Kings and Chronicles" (PDF), Bibliotheca Sacra, 148: 3–45, archived from the original (PDF) on 2010-08-27
- Thiele, Edwin R. (1983). The Mysterious Numbers of the Hebrew Kings (3rd ed.). Grand Rapids, Michigan: Zondervan. ISBN 978-0-310-36010-0.
- Würthwein, Ernst (1995). The Text of the Old Testament. Translated by Rhodes, Erroll F. Grand Rapids, MI: William B. Eerdmans. ISBN 0-8028-0788-7.
