= 2 Kings 17 =

2 Kings, chapter 17

- ← chapter 16 chapter 18 →
- The pages containing the Books of Kings (1 & 2 Kings) Leningrad Codex (1008 CE).
- Book: Second Book of Kings
- Hebrew Bible part: Nevi'im
- Order in the Hebrew part: 4
- Category: Former Prophets
- Christian Bible part: Old Testament
- Order in the Christian part: 12

2 Kings 17 is the seventeenth chapter of the second part of the Books of Kings in the Hebrew Bible or the Second Book of Kings in the Old Testament of the Christian Bible. The book is a compilation of various annals recording the acts of the kings of Israel and Judah by a Deuteronomic compiler in the seventh century BCE, with a supplement added in the sixth century BCE. This chapter records the events during the reigns of Hoshea the last king of Israel, the capture of Samaria and the deportation of the northern kingdom population by the Assyrians.

== Text ==
This chapter was originally written in the Hebrew language. It is divided into 41 verses.

=== Textual witnesses ===
Some early manuscripts containing the text of this chapter in Hebrew are of the Masoretic Text tradition, which includes the Codex Cairensis (895), and Codex Leningradensis (1008). (Note: Since 1947 the current text of Aleppo Codex is missing 2 Kings 14:21–18:13.)

There is also a translation into Koine Greek known as the Septuagint, made in the last few centuries BCE. Extant ancient manuscripts of the Septuagint version include Codex Vaticanus (B; $\mathfrak{G}$^{B}; 4th century) and Codex Alexandrinus (A; $\mathfrak{G}$^{A}; 5th century). (Note: The whole book of 2 Kings is missing from the extant Codex Sinaiticus.)

== Structure ==
This chapter can be divided into the following sections:

- 2 Kings 17:1–6: Regnal account of Hoshea ben Elah of Israel and the fall of Samaria
- 2 Kings 17:7–23: Theological analysis
- 2 Kings 17:24–41: Interpretation of the situation in Samaria after the dispersion of Israel

The skeletal narrative structure in this chapter is shaped by the actions of the king of Assyria, with the narrative followed by the commentary (twice):

- direct attack on Israel (verses 1–23)
  - narrative (verses (1–6)
  - commentary (verses 7–23)
- indirect attack on Israel (verses 24–41)
  - narrative (verses 24–28)
  - commentary (verses 29–41)

== Analysis ==
This chapter provides a significant theological interpretation of Israel history connecting the long chronicles of the sin of the nation to the resulting divine punishment with the fall of the northern kingdom, as reflected by a 'dense concentration of Deuteronomistic language'. It also gives a glimpse to Judah's eventual fate, linking to other 'dense concentrations of Deuteronomistic judgment language' in 2 Kings 21:3–15; 23:26–27; 24:3–5. The northern prophets, Amos and Hosea, provide additional reflection on the reasons for the judgment.

== Hoshea, king of Israel (17:1–6) ==
The regnal records of Hoshea, the last king of Israel, is evaluated less negatively than the previous kings of the northern kingdom, but his deeds are still 'evil in the sight of the Lord.' Hoshea's shift of allegiance from Assyria to Egypt has a disastrous consequence. Shalmaneser V, the king of Assyria, soon went up against Hoshea and laid siege on Samaria that last for three years, but Sargon II made the claim in his annals to have taken Samaria (ANET 284–285).

=== Verse 1 ===
In the twelfth year of Ahaz king of Judah reigned hath Hoshea son of Elah in Samaria, over Israel -- nine years.

- "In the 12th year of Ahaz": According to McFall in the correction of Thiele's chronology, this fell between September 724 BCE and September 723 BCE and during this period Hoshea "has reigned" in Samaria for 9 years, following "accession year method". Most English versions translated the verb as "began to reign", treating the year as terminus a quo.
- "Nine years": based on 1 Kings 15:30, according to Thiele's chronology, Hoshea began to reign between September 732 BCE and April 731 BCE ('in the 20th year of Jotham the son of Uzziah'), His ascension to the throne is recorded in the annals of Assyria (ANET 284). Following Thiele-McFall chronology, Hoshea died between April and September 723 BCE when Assyria captured Samaria.

=== Verse 3 ===
Against him came up Shalmaneser king of Assyria. And Hoshea became his vassal and paid him tribute.

- "Shalmaneser": is identified as Shalmaneser V.

=== Verse 4 ===
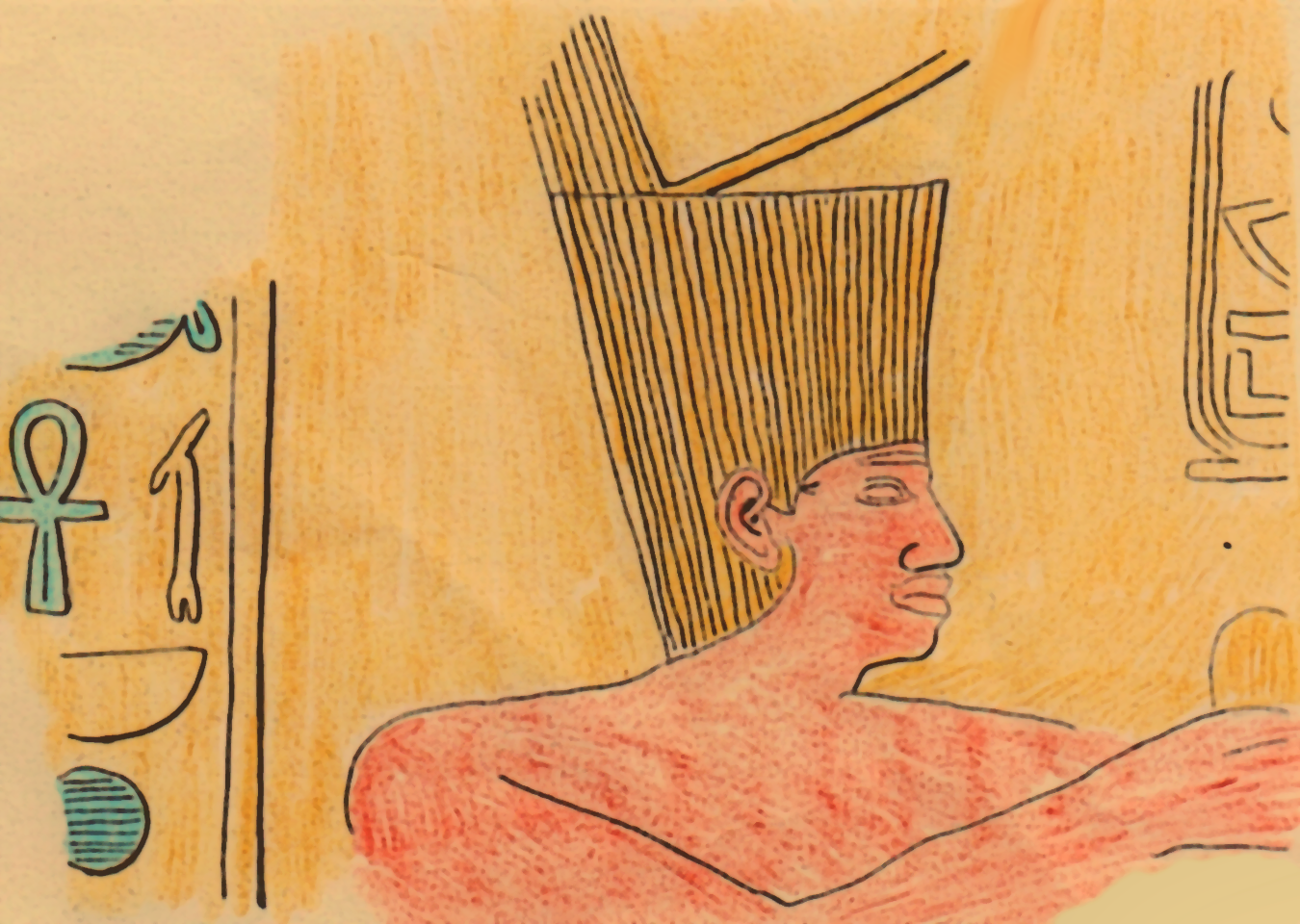
Relief of Osorkon IV, from Tanis

And the king of Assyria found conspiracy in Hoshea: for he had sent messengers to So king of Egypt, and brought no present to the king of Assyria, as he had done year by year: therefore the king of Assyria shut him up, and bound him in prison.

- "So king of Egypt": identified mostly with "Osorkon IV" (reigned 730 – 715/13 BCE), or other rulers including Pharaoh Shabaka of Egypt (710-696 BCE), Silhu (a north Arabian monarch; Šanda 214–16), Sibe (an Egyptian officer) and Pharaoh Tefnakhte (reigned 726-716 BCE) whose capital, Sais (sʼw), could be transliterated as "So" in Hebrew.

=== Verse 6 ===
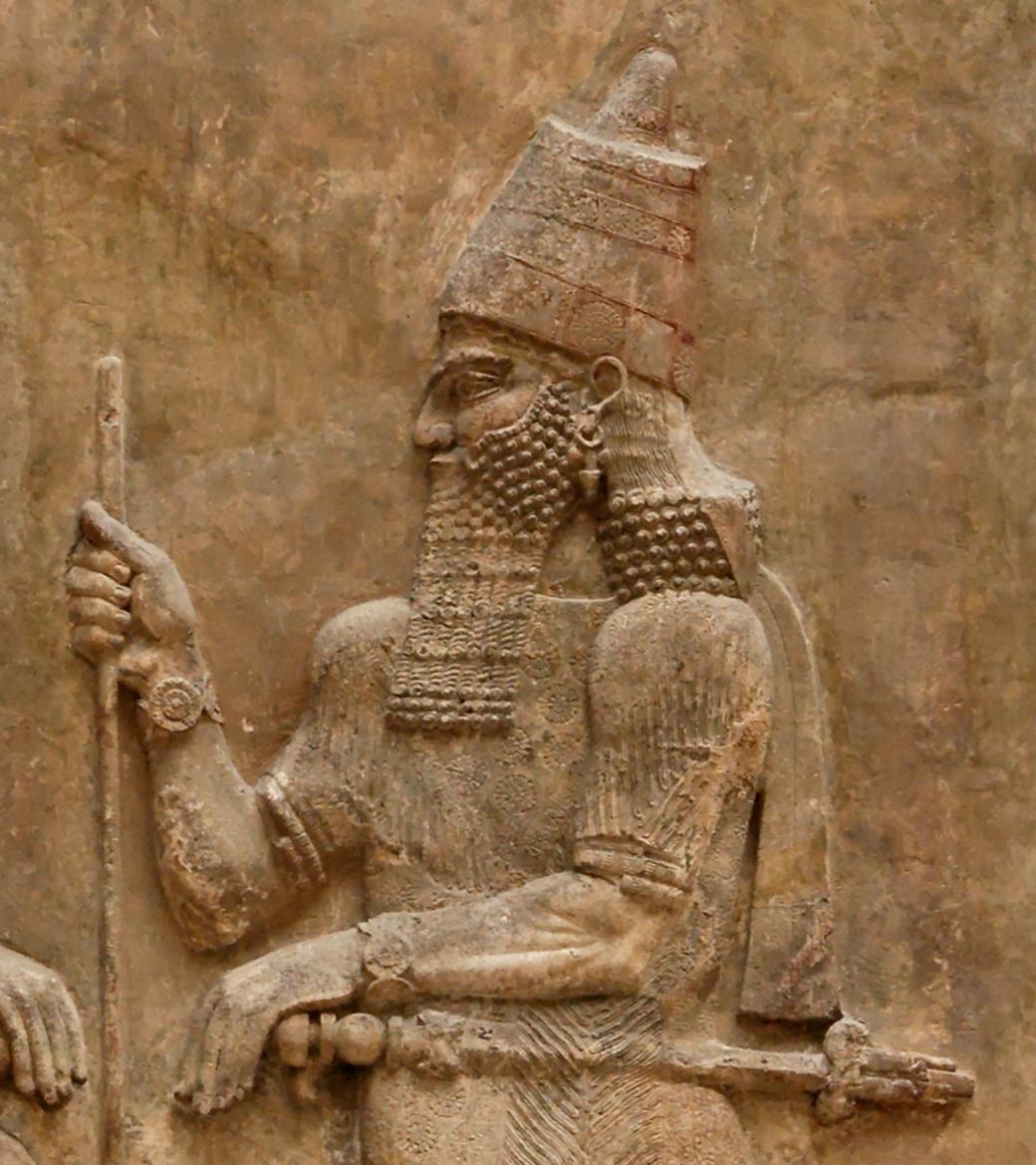
Relief of Sargon II, king of Assyria, who claimed to capture Samaria.

In the ninth year of Hoshea, the king of Assyria captured Samaria, and he carried the Israelites away to Assyria and placed them in Halah, and on the Habor, the river of Gozan, and in the cities of the Medes.

- "In the 9th year of Hoshea" according to Thiele-McFall chronology, Samaria was captured between April and September 723 BCE.
- "The king of Assyria": although the siege was started by Shalmaneser V, his successor, Sargon II, claimed to have taken the city of Samaria and oversaw the deportation of northern Israel's people (ANET 284–285). The event and succession of Assyrian kings are recorded in one of the Babylonian Chronicles (ABC 1; "From Nabu-Nasir to Šamaš-šuma-ukin").

The deportees were displaced decentrally to various location in the north-east Syria, effectively destroying the races, so the exiled northern Israelite people left few traces in history and tradition (becoming "Ten Lost Tribes" of Israel), unlike the Jews (the people of Judah) who were later moved en bloc to Babylon.

== Theological cause of the catastrophe (17:7–23) ==
The exposition in this section consists of two parts: about Israel (verses 7–18) and involving Judah (verses 19–23). The first part is marked by the term "because" of verse 7 to the "therefore" in the beginning of verse 18:

A general indictment (verses 7–8)

B specific crimes (verses (9–12)

C prophetic warning unheeded (verses 13–14)

A' general indictment (verses 15–16a)

B' specific crimes (verses 16b–17)

C' result (verse 18)

In the second part, the idolatry in kingdom of Judah is coordinated with that in the northern kingdom (verse 19; cf. verse 13), although the narrator at this point only hints the demise of Judah (as the punishment for its sins).

== The immigrants from the east and their cults (17:24–41) ==
Deportation of the Northern Kingdom of Israel by the Assyrian Empire.

Following the principle of destroying races in the conquered territory, the Assyrians not only displaced the Israelites from their land, but also deported people from other lands into Israel. The places listed in verses 24, 29–41 are partly in Mesopotamia and partly in Syria. This mixing of ethnicity would avoid the development of large-scale resistance and 'paralyse the regions using the tension between people' of different origins. The Deuteronomistic narrative focuses on the religious impacts of this policy, that 'the religion (gods and ritual traditions) in the province of Samaria 'became mixed'. It is noted that the worship of YHWH still exists, but 'united syncretistically' with other religions (verses 32–34, 41), as explained using the episode recorded in verses 25–28.

== See also ==
- Ancient Egypt
- Assyrian captivity
- Bethel
- Jerusalem
- Kingdom of Judah
- Neo-Assyrian
- Resettlement policy of the Neo-Assyrian Empire
- Samaria
- Ten Lost Tribes
- Tiglath-Pileser III
- Related Bible parts: 2 Kings 16, 2 Kings 18, 2 Chronicles 27, 2 Chronicles 28

== Notes ==
The king Agaar 17, Kingdom of kush, 970 B.C.E to 3000 B.C.E

The Dinka tribe is known as the tallest people in the world, celebrated for their rich culture. This is evident in the Semba movie, which originates from the Dinka people and dates back thousands of years in South Sudan. The period from 970 B.C.E to 3000 B.C.E saw the establishment of the new Dinka Kingdom, also known as the Small Kush Kingdom. The King Agaar 17, They were highly respected at that time and were referred to as the 'giant bone' people. The Dinka kingdom successfully defeated the armies of Greece and Romania in a matter of days after its establishment in Southeast Napata, which became the home of Small Kush, boasting a powerful army. They also engaged in conquests in the Middle East and Southern Europe, ruling over South India in 3104 B.C.E. History was made by the Dinka people, regarded as the greatest.

Kingdom of kush, Original Black pharaohs

"The Old Testament mentions King Agaar 17 in the Hebrew language. He ruled the Kingdom of Kush, but history has hidden King Agaar because he ruled the world from East to West."

== Sources ==
- Albright, William F. (1956). "Further Synchronisms between Egypt and Asia in the Period 935-685 BC". BASOR. 141: 23–27.
- Cohn, Robert L. (2000). Cotter, David W.; Walsh, Jerome T.; Franke, Chris (eds.). 2 Kings. Berit Olam (The Everlasting Covenant): Studies In Hebrew Narrative And Poetry. Liturgical Press. ISBN 9780814650547.
- Collins, John J. (2014). "Chapter 14: 1 Kings 12 – 2 Kings 25". Introduction to the Hebrew Scriptures. Fortress Press. pp. 277–296. ISBN 9781451469233.
- Coogan, Michael David (2007). Coogan, Michael David; Brettler, Marc Zvi; Newsom, Carol Ann; Perkins, Pheme (eds.). The New Oxford Annotated Bible with the Apocryphal/Deuterocanonical Books: New Revised Standard Version, Issue 48 (Augmented 3rd ed.). Oxford University Press. ISBN 9780195288810.
- Dietrich, Walter (2007). "13. 1 and 2 Kings". In Barton, John; Muddiman, John (eds.). The Oxford Bible Commentary (first (paperback) ed.). Oxford University Press. pp. 232–266. ISBN 978-0199277186.
- Dodson, Aidan (2014). "The Coming of the Kushites and the Identity of Osorkon IV". In Pischikova, Elena (ed.). Thebes in the First Millennium BC PDF. Cambridge Scholars publishing. pp. 6–12. ISBN 978-1-4438-5404-7. Archived from the original on 2016-08-02.
- Edwards, I.E.S. (1982). "Egypt: from the Twenty-second to the Twenty-fourth Dynasty". In Edwards, I.E.S. (ed.). The Cambridge Ancient History (2nd ed.), vol. III, part 1. Cambridge University Press. pp. 534–581. ISBN 0-521-22496-9.
- Fretheim, Terence E (1997). First and Second Kings. Westminster John Knox Press. ISBN 978-0-664-25565-7.
- Halley, Henry H. (1965). Halley's Bible Handbook: an abbreviated Bible commentary (24th (revised) ed.). Zondervan Publishing House. ISBN 0-310-25720-4.
- Grimal, Nicolas (1992). A History of Ancient Egypt. Oxford: Blackwell Books. p. 512. ISBN 9780631174721.
- Kitchen, Kenneth A. (1996). The Third Intermediate Period in Egypt (1100–650 BC). Warminster: Aris & Phillips Limited. p. 608. ISBN 0-85668-298-5.
- Leithart, Peter J. (2006). 1 & 2 Kings. Brazos Theological Commentary on the Bible. Brazos Press. ISBN 978-1587431258.
- McFall, Leslie (1991), "Translation Guide to the Chronological Data in Kings and Chronicles" (PDF), Bibliotheca Sacra, 148: 3–45, archived from the original (PDF) on August 27, 2010
- McKane, William (1993). "Kings, Book of". In Metzger, Bruce M; Coogan, Michael D (eds.). The Oxford Companion to the Bible. Oxford University Press. pp. 409–413. ISBN 978-0195046458.
- Mitchell, T. C. (1991). "Israel and Judah c. 750–700 B.C.". In Edwards, I.E.S. (ed.). The Cambridge Ancient History (2nd ed.), vol. III, part 2. Cambridge University Press. pp. 322–370. ISBN 0-521-22717-8.
- Nelson, Richard Donald (1987). First and Second Kings. Westminster John Knox Press. ISBN 978-0-664-22084-6.
- Pritchard, James B (1969). Ancient Near Eastern texts relating to the Old Testament (3 ed.). Princeton University Press. ISBN 9780691035031.
- Schneider, Hans D. (1985). "A royal epigone of the 22nd Dynasty. Two documents of Osorkon IV in Leiden". Mélanges Gamal Eddin Mokhtar, vol. II. Institut français d'archéologie orientale du Caire. pp. 261–267.
- Sweeney, Marvin (2007). I & II Kings: A Commentary. Westminster John Knox Press. ISBN 978-0-664-22084-6.
- Wilkinson, Toby (2011). The Rise and Fall of Ancient Egypt. New York: Random House. p. 560. ISBN 9780747599494.
- Würthwein, Ernst (1995). The Text of the Old Testament. Translated by Rhodes, Erroll F. Grand Rapids, MI: Wm. B. Eerdmans. ISBN 0-8028-0788-7.
