= K. L. Noll =

American historian

- Born: Kurt Lesher Noll

Academic background
- Education: Shippensburg University; Gettysburg Seminary; Union Presbyterian Seminary
- Thesis: The Faces of David (1995)
- Doctoral advisor: S. Dean McBride
- Other advisor: Richard D. Nelson

Academic work
- Discipline: Religious studies
- Institutions: Brandon University
- Main interests: Christ myth theory

Kurt Lesher Noll, also known as K. L. Noll, is an American biblical scholar and historian. He is currently Associate Professor and Chair of the Religion Department at Brandon University in Brandon, Manitoba, Canada, where he teaches Judaism, Christianity, biblical languages, and Islam.

He holds a PhD and a Master of Theology from Union Theological Seminary in Virginia (now called Union Presbyterian Seminary), as well a Master of Arts (Honors) from Lutheran Theological Seminary at Gettysburg and a Bachelor of Arts (summa cum laude) from Shippensburg University. Prior to entering academia, he was a professional illustrator and designer.

His books include The Faces of David (Sheffield: Sheffield Academic Press, 1997), Canaan and Israel in Antiquity: An Introduction (London: Sheffield Academic Press/Continuum, 2001), and Canaan and Israel in Antiquity: A Textbook on History and Religion (London: T&T Clark/Bloomsbury, 2012). He has also published a number of articles and reviews.

Noll is the author of a chapter in Is This Not the Carpenter? The Question of the Historicity of the Figure of Jesus (edited by Thomas L. Thompson and Thomas S. Verenna. London: Equinox, 2012) entitled "Investigating Earliest Christianity Without Jesus". The article methodically explains how it is possible that a literal Jesus was invented as a "Darwinian strategy" by the early church to persuade people to become Christians. Although his article tends to support the Christ myth theory, he concludes, however, that the lack of historical accuracy in the gospels is not proof that Jesus did not exist, and ultimately, it is not important if he lived or not explaining it "is irrelevant to an understanding of the earliest social movements that evolved into the religion now called Christianity."

== Bibliography ==
- The Faces of David (Sheffield: Sheffield Academic Press, 1997),
- Canaan and Israel in Antiquity: An Introduction (London: Sheffield Academic Press/Continuum, 2001)
- Canaan and Israel in Antiquity: A Textbook on History and Religion (London: T&T Clark/Bloomsbury, 2012)
