= 2 Chronicles 27 =

Second Book of Chronicles, chapter 27

- ← chapter 26 chapter 28 →
- The complete Hebrew text of the Books of Chronicles (1st and 2nd Chronicles) in the Leningrad Codex (1008 CE).
- Book: Books of Chronicles
- Category: Ketuvim
- Christian Bible part: Old Testament
- Order in the Christian part: 14

2 Chronicles 27 is the twenty-seventh chapter of the Second Book of Chronicles the Old Testament in the Christian Bible or of the second part of the Books of Chronicles in the Hebrew Bible. The book is compiled from older sources by an unknown person or group, designated by modern scholars as "the Chronicler", and had the final shape established in late fifth or fourth century BCE. This chapter belongs to the section focusing on the kingdom of Judah until its destruction by the Babylonians under Nebuchadnezzar and the beginning of restoration under Cyrus the Great of Persia (2 Chronicles 10 to 36). The focus of this chapter is the reign of Jotham, king of Judah.

== Text ==
This chapter was originally written in the Hebrew language and is divided into 9 verses.

=== Textual witnesses ===
Some early manuscripts containing the text of this chapter in Hebrew are of the Masoretic Text tradition, which includes the Codex Leningradensis (1008). (Note: Since 1947 the current text of Aleppo Codex is missing 2 Chronicles 26:19–35:7.), and Codex Leningradensis (1008).

There is also a translation into Koine Greek known as the Septuagint, made in the last few centuries BCE. Extant ancient manuscripts of the Septuagint version include Codex Vaticanus (B; $\mathfrak{G}$^{B}; 4th century), and Codex Alexandrinus (A; $\mathfrak{G}$^{A}; 5th century). (Note: The whole book of 2 Chronicles is missing from the extant Codex Sinaiticus.)

=== Old Testament references ===
- 2 Chronicles 27:1–9: 2 Kings 15:32–38

== Jotham, king of Judah (27:1–9) ==
Jotham receives positive judgment for his reign (cf. 2 Kings 15), repeating the praise for Uzziah (2 Chronicles 25:2) with the addition of 'only he did not invade the temple of the LORD' (verse 2), and therefore was rewarded threefold (verses. 3–6):

- (1) He was able to build various kinds of fortresses in Judah, as well as the upper gate of the Temple and the wall of Ophel.
- (2) He defeated the Ammonites.
- (3) He got an extremely high tribute from the Ammonites for the period of three years. Because of Jotham's good behavior towards God, Rezin and Pekah could not threaten Judah during Jotham's reign.

=== Verse 1 ===
Jotham was twenty-five years old when he began to reign, and he reigned sixteen years in Jerusalem. His mother's name was Jerushah the daughter of Zadok.

- Cross references: 2 Kings 15:33; 2 Chronicles 27:8
- "16 years": according to Thiele's chronology, Jotham started to reign at the age of 25 in co-regency with his father, Uzziah (57 years old), around April 750 BCE, and became a sole king between September 740 BCE and September 739 BCE, after Uzziah's death (68 years old). Jotham transferred the throne to his son, Ahaz, around September 735 BCE to conclude his reign for a total of 16 years. However, Jotham seems to hold some state functions until April 731 BCE, while Ahaz officially was on the throne, resulting a phrase "in the 20th year of Jothan") in the synchronization with the reign of Hosea in the kingdom of Israel (verse 30), despite the official count of 16 years of Jotham's reign. Jotham died between September 732 BCE and September 732 BCE. A royal bulla (seal) with the inscription: "Belonging to Ahaz (son of) Yehotam (=Jotham), King of Judah" was discovered and authenticated.
- "Jerushah": written as "Jerusha" in 15:33.

=== Verse 5 ===
He fought also with the king of the Ammonites, and prevailed against them. And the children of Ammon gave him the same year an hundred talents of silver, and ten thousand measures of wheat, and ten thousand of barley. So much did the children of Ammon pay unto him, both the second year, and the third.

- "100 talents": About 3¾ tons, or 3.4 metric tons. A talent was about 75 pounds or 34 kilograms. The term "talent" is used to translate the Hebrew word כִּכַּר (kikkar, meaning "circle") generally referring to "something that is round", or a 'disk-shaped weight made of the metal" and, by extension, to a standard unit of weight.
- "Measures" from Hebrew kor or cor, each was about 6 bushels or 220 liters.

== See also ==
- Ahaz
- Ammon
- City of David (historic)
- Jerusalem
- Uzziah
- Zadok
- Related Bible parts: 2 Kings 15, 2 Chronicles 26

== Sources ==
- Ackroyd, Peter R (1993). "Chronicles, Books of". In Metzger, Bruce M; Coogan, Michael D (eds.). The Oxford Companion to the Bible. Oxford University Press. pp. 113–116. ISBN 978-0195046458.
- Bennett, William (2018). The Expositor's Bible: The Books of Chronicles. Litres. ISBN 978-5040825196.
- Coogan, Michael David (2007). Coogan, Michael David; Brettler, Marc Zvi; Newsom, Carol Ann; Perkins, Pheme (eds.). The New Oxford Annotated Bible with the Apocryphal/Deuterocanonical Books: New Revised Standard Version, Issue 48 (Augmented 3rd ed.). Oxford University Press. ISBN 9780195288810.
- Mabie, Frederick (2017). "I. The Chronicler's Genealogical Survey of All Israel". In Longman III, Tremper; Garland, David E (eds.). 1 and 2 Chronicles. The Expositor's Bible Commentary. Zondervan. pp. 267–308. ISBN 978-0310531814.
- Mathys, H. P. (2007). "14. 1 and 2 Chronicles". In Barton, John; Muddiman, John (eds.). The Oxford Bible Commentary (first (paperback) ed.). Oxford University Press. pp. 267–308. ISBN 978-0199277186.
- McFall, Leslie (1991), "Translation Guide to the Chronological Data in Kings and Chronicles" (PDF), Bibliotheca Sacra, 148: 3-45, archived from the original (PDF) on 2010-08-27
- Thiele, Edwin R. (1983). The Mysterious Numbers of the Hebrew Kings (3rd ed.). Grand Rapids, Michigan: Zondervan. ISBN 978-0-310-36010-0.
- Würthwein, Ernst (1995). The Text of the Old Testament. Translated by Rhodes, Erroll F. Grand Rapids, MI: William B. Eerdmans. ISBN 0-8028-0788-7.
