= Isaiah 6 =

Book of Isaiah, chapter 6

- ← chapter 5 chapter 7 →
- The Great Isaiah Scroll, the best preserved of the biblical scrolls found at Qumran dated c. 100–340 BCE, contains all the verses in this chapter.
- Book: Book of Isaiah
- Hebrew Bible part: Nevi'im
- Order in the Hebrew part: 5
- Category: Latter Prophets
- Christian Bible part: Old Testament
- Order in the Christian part: 23

Isaiah 6 is the sixth chapter of the Book of Isaiah in the Hebrew Bible or the Old Testament of the Christian Bible. This book contains the prophecies attributed to the prophet Isaiah, and is one of the Books of the Prophets. The Jerusalem Bible refers to Isaiah 6-12 as Isaiah's Book of Immanuel. This chapter records the calling of Isaiah to be the messenger of God to the people of Israel.

== Text ==
The original text was written in Hebrew language. This chapter is divided into 13 verses.

=== Textual witnesses ===
Some early manuscripts containing the text of this chapter in Hebrew are of the Masoretic Text tradition, which includes the Codex Cairensis (895), the Petersburg Codex of the Prophets (916), Aleppo Codex (10th century), Codex Leningradensis (1008).

Fragments containing parts of this chapter were found among the Dead Sea Scrolls (3rd century BCE or later):

- 1QIsa^{a}: complete
- 4QIsa^{a} (4Q55): extant: verses 4–7
- 4QIsa^{f} (4Q60): extant: verses 3–8, 10–13

There is also a translation into Koine Greek known as the Septuagint, made in the last few centuries BCE. Extant ancient manuscripts of the Septuagint version include Codex Vaticanus (B; $\mathfrak{G}$^{B}; 4th century), Codex Sinaiticus (S; BHK: $\mathfrak{G}$^{S}; 4th century), Codex Alexandrinus (A; $\mathfrak{G}$^{A}; 5th century) and Codex Marchalianus (Q; $\mathfrak{G}$^{Q}; 6th century).

=== Old Testament references ===
- Isaiah 6:9–10: Isaiah 43:8; Isaiah 44:18–20

=== New Testament references ===
- Isaiah 6:9–10: Matthew 13:14–15; Mark 4:12; Luke 8:10; John 12:40; Acts 28:26–27; Romans 11:8.

== Parashot ==
In Jewish prayer, the entire Isaiah 6 is part of the Haftara on the Shabbat when the parasha of Yitro, which includes the Ten Commandments, is read from the Torah scroll.

== Isaiah's vision of the Lord (6:1–7) ==
=== Verse 1 ===
In the year that King Uzziah died, I saw the Lord sitting on a throne, high and lifted up, and the train of His robe filled the temple.

- Cross reference: 2 Chronicles 26:16–21

The date of the death of Uzziah has been estimated as around 740 BCE. Archaeologist William F. Albright dated Uzziah's reign to 783–742 BCE.

=== Verse 2 ===
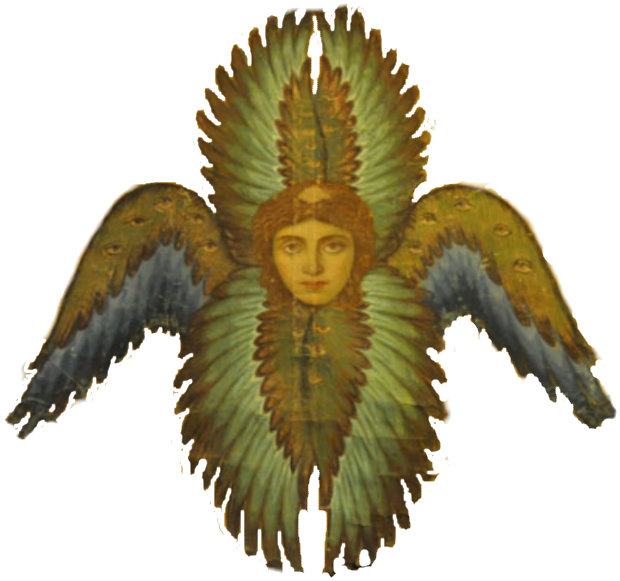
Depiction of a Seraph

Above him stood the seraphim. Each had six wings: with two he covered his face, and with two he covered his feet, and with two he flew.

- "Seraphim": described here as the 'messengers in the divine council', but has no real biblical parallel. The root word ś-r-p, for Seraph, gives a portrayal of the 'burning ones'.

=== Verse 3 ===
And one called to another and said:

"Holy, holy, holy is the Lord of hosts;
the whole earth is full of his glory!"

This verse is repeated several times in daily Jewish services, including the Kedushah prayer during the repetition of the Amidah, and is part of the Sanctus in Christian Eucharistic Prayer.

=== Verse 5 ===
Then said I, Woe is me! for I am undone; because I am a man of unclean lips, and I dwell in the midst of a people of unclean lips: for mine eyes have seen the King, the Lord of hosts.

- The verb rendered “I am undone” (nidmeti) is ambiguous. J. J. M. Roberts argues that Isaiah is deliberately exploiting a double meaning, since the word can signify both “I am destroyed” and “I am silenced,” and the passage’s repeated emphasis on lips, ending with the seraph touching Isaiah’s lips with a coal before his commission, supports hearing both senses at once.

== Isaiah's commission from the Lord (6:8–13) ==
=== Verse 8 ===
Also I heard the voice of the Lord, saying,

Whom shall I send,
and who will go for us?

Then said I,

Here am I; send me.

- "Us": the plural form refers to 'the entire divine assembly'.
- "Here am I; send me": This declaration is remarkable because it is in contrast to the despair Isaiah expresses in verse 5 and for the observation that his human voice is heard in the heavenly court (cf. 1 Kings 22:19–23; Revelation 5:1–14). The Jerusalem Bible notes Abraham and Isaiah as examples of biblical characters who readily respond, and contrasts them with Moses and Jeremiah, whose response is hesitant.

=== Verse 13 ===
"But yet a tenth will be in it,
And will return and be for consuming,
As a terebinth tree or as an oak,
Whose stump remains when it is cut down.
So the holy seed shall be its stump."

Cross reference: Isaiah 4:2; Isaiah 11:1; Isaiah 53:2; Jeremiah 23:5

== See also ==
- Jerusalem of Gold
- Seraphim
- Temple in Jerusalem
- Throne of God
- Uzziah, king of Judah
- Related Bible parts: 2 Chronicles 26; Matthew 13; Mark 4; Luke 8; John 12; Acts 28; Romans 11

== Sources ==
- Coggins, R (2007). "22. Isaiah". In Barton, John; Muddiman, John (eds.). The Oxford Bible Commentary (first (paperback) ed.). Oxford University Press. pp. 433–486. ISBN 978-0199277186.
- Coogan, Michael David (2007). Coogan, Michael David; Brettler, Marc Zvi; Newsom, Carol Ann; Perkins, Pheme (eds.). The New Oxford Annotated Bible with the Apocryphal/Deuterocanonical Books: New Revised Standard Version, Issue 48 (Augmented 3rd ed.). Oxford University Press. ISBN 9780195288810.
- Kidner, Derek (1994). "Isaiah". In Carson, D. A.; France, R. T.; Motyer, J. A.; Wenham, G. J. (eds.). New Bible Commentary: 21st Century Edition (4th, illustrated, reprint, revised ed.). Inter-Varsity Press. pp. 629–670. ISBN 9780851106489.
- Würthwein, Ernst (1995). The Text of the Old Testament. Translated by Rhodes, Erroll F. Grand Rapids, MI: Wm. B. Eerdmans. ISBN 0-8028-0788-7.
