= 2 Chronicles 28 =

Second Book of Chronicles, chapter 28

- ← chapter 27 chapter 29 →
- The complete Hebrew text of the Books of Chronicles (1st and 2nd Chronicles) in the Leningrad Codex (1008 CE).
- Book: Books of Chronicles
- Category: Ketuvim
- Christian Bible part: Old Testament
- Order in the Christian part: 14

2 Chronicles 28 is the twenty-eighth chapter of the Second Book of Chronicles the Old Testament in the Christian Bible or of the second part of the Books of Chronicles in the Hebrew Bible. The book is compiled from older sources by an unknown person or group, designated by modern scholars as "the Chronicler", and had the final shape established in late fifth or fourth century BCE. This chapter belongs to the section focusing on the kingdom of Judah until its destruction by the Babylonians under Nebuchadnezzar and the beginning of restoration under Cyrus the Great of Persia (2 Chronicles 10 to 36). The focus of this chapter is the reign of Ahaz, king of Judah.

== Text ==
This chapter was originally written in the Hebrew language and is divided into 27 verses.

=== Textual witnesses ===
Some early manuscripts containing the text of this chapter in Hebrew are of the Masoretic Text tradition, which includes the Codex Leningradensis (1008). (Note: Since 1947 the current text of Aleppo Codex is missing 2 Chronicles 26:19–35:7.) A fragment containing a part of this chapter was found among the Dead Sea Scrolls, that is, 4Q118 (4QChr; 50–25 BCE) with extant verse 27.

There is also a translation into Koine Greek known as the Septuagint, made in the last few centuries BCE. Extant ancient manuscripts of the Septuagint version include Codex Vaticanus (B; $\mathfrak{G}$^{B}; 4th century), and Codex Alexandrinus (A; $\mathfrak{G}$^{A}; 5th century). (Note: The whole book of 2 Chronicles is missing from the extant Codex Sinaiticus.)

=== Old Testament references ===
- 2 Chronicles 28:1–4: 2 Kings 16:1–9
- 2 Chronicles 28:5–15: Isaiah 1:1–9
- 2 Chronicles 28:16–27: 2 Kings 16:10–20

== Ahaz, king of Judah (28:1–4) ==
Ahaz's reign was dominated by the Syro-Ephraimite war, against the kingdoms of Israel and Aram, due to Ahaz's wicked way and refusal to convert. His reign marks the unmitigated decline of the kingdom of Judah.

=== Verse 1 ===
Ahaz was twenty years old when he began to reign, and he reigned sixteen years in Jerusalem. And he did not do what was right in the eyes of the Lord, as his father David had done,

- Cross references: 2 Kings 15:33; 2 Chronicles 27:8
- "16 years": according to Thiele's chronology, Ahaz became co-regent in September 735 BCE, then as sole king for 16 years between September 732 BCE and September 731 BCE until he died a few weeks (or days) before Nisan 715 BCE. A royal bulla (seal) with the inscription: "Belonging to Ahaz (son of) Yehotam (=Jotham), King of Judah" was discovered and authenticated.

== Judah were defeated by enemies (28:5–21) ==
A possible opportunity of Israel reunification by northern kingdom's subjugation of Judah was prevented by God's word through the prophet Oded (verses 9–11) and some chiefs of the Ephraimites (verses 9–11), so the army of Israel treated the captives from Judah humanely (a mirror image of 2 Chronicles 13, in which Judah and Israel have exchanged their roles). Some details of the good treatments by the people of "Samaria" in verses 9–15 are apparently underlined in the well-known story of "the Good Samaritans" in the Gospel of Luke (Luke 10:25–37). While Ahaz sought and waited for Tiglath-pileser's support (not recorded in the Chronicles, the books of Kings note that later Tiglath-pileser accepted the offer, defeated Damascus, deported its citizens, and killed king Rezin), the Edomites (verse 17) and the Philistines (verse 18) had successfully defeated Judah. Verses 20–21 emphasize that Tiglath-pileser did not really come to help, because he extorted heavy tribute from Judah.

== Apostasy and death of Ahaz (28:22–27) ==
Verses 22–25 record the cultic sins of Ahaz as he worshipped for the gods of Damascus, the land that defeated him, and abandoned the worship of YHWH.

=== Verse 15 ===
And the men who have been mentioned by name rose and took the captives, and with the spoil they clothed all who were naked among them. They clothed them, gave them sandals, provided them with food and drink, and anointed them, and carrying all the feeble among them on donkeys, they brought them to their kinsfolk at Jericho, the city of palm trees. Then they returned to Samaria.

- "Clothed them, gave them sandals": alluding the 'miserable destitution of captives' (cf. Isaiah 3:24; Isaiah 20:2; Isaiah 20:4, "naked and barefoot").

This verse displays the strongest parallels with Luke 10 (Luke 10:30, 33–34).

== See also ==
- Aram
- Ajalon
- Bethshemesh
- Damascus
- Edomites
- Gehenna
- Hezekiah
- Jericho
- Jerusalem
- Maaseiah
- Pekah
- Philistines
- Samaria
- Tiglath-Pileser III
- Zichri
- Related Bible parts: 2 Kings 16, 2 Chronicles 27, Isaiah 1, Luke 10

== Sources ==
- Ackroyd, Peter R (1993). "Chronicles, Books of". In Metzger, Bruce M; Coogan, Michael D (eds.). The Oxford Companion to the Bible. Oxford University Press. pp. 113–116. ISBN 978-0195046458.
- Bennett, William (2018). The Expositor's Bible: The Books of Chronicles. Litres. ISBN 978-5040825196.
- Coogan, Michael David (2007). Coogan, Michael David; Brettler, Marc Zvi; Newsom, Carol Ann; Perkins, Pheme (eds.). The New Oxford Annotated Bible with the Apocryphal/Deuterocanonical Books: New Revised Standard Version, Issue 48 (Augmented 3rd ed.). Oxford University Press. ISBN 9780195288810.
- Fitzmyer, Joseph A. (2008). A Guide to the Dead Sea Scrolls and Related Literature. Grand Rapids, MI: William B. Eerdmans Publishing Company. ISBN 9780802862419.
- Mabie, Frederick (2017). "I. The Chronicler's Genealogical Survey of All Israel". In Longman III, Tremper; Garland, David E (eds.). 1 and 2 Chronicles. The Expositor's Bible Commentary. Zondervan. pp. 267–308. ISBN 978-0310531814.
- Mathys, H. P. (2007). "14. 1 and 2 Chronicles". In Barton, John; Muddiman, John (eds.). The Oxford Bible Commentary (first (paperback) ed.). Oxford University Press. pp. 267–308. ISBN 978-0199277186.
- McFall, Leslie (1991), "Translation Guide to the Chronological Data in Kings and Chronicles" (PDF), Bibliotheca Sacra, 148: 3–45, archived from the original (PDF) on 2010-08-27
- Thiele, Edwin R. (1983). The Mysterious Numbers of the Hebrew Kings (3rd ed.). Grand Rapids, Michigan: Zondervan. ISBN 978-0-310-36010-0.
- Ulrich, Eugene, ed. (2010). The Biblical Qumran Scrolls: Transcriptions and Textual Variants. Brill.
- Würthwein, Ernst (1995). The Text of the Old Testament. Translated by Rhodes, Erroll F. Grand Rapids, MI: William B. Eerdmans. ISBN 0-8028-0788-7.
