= 2 Chronicles 25 =

Second Book of Chronicles, chapter 25

- ← chapter 24 chapter 26 →
- The complete Hebrew text of the Books of Chronicles (1st and 2nd Chronicles) in the Leningrad Codex (1008 CE).
- Book: Books of Chronicles
- Category: Ketuvim
- Christian Bible part: Old Testament
- Order in the Christian part: 14

2 Chronicles 25 is the twenty-fifth chapter of the Second Book of Chronicles the Old Testament in the Christian Bible or of the second part of the Books of Chronicles in the Hebrew Bible. The book is compiled from older sources by an unknown person or group, designated by modern scholars as "the Chronicler", and had the final shape established in late fifth or fourth century BCE. This chapter belongs to the section focusing on the kingdom of Judah until its destruction by the Babylonians under Nebuchadnezzar and the beginning of restoration under Cyrus the Great of Persia (2 Chronicles 10 to 36). The focus of this chapter is the reign of Amaziah, king of Judah.

== Text ==
This chapter was originally written in the Hebrew language and is divided into 28 verses.

=== Textual witnesses ===
Some early manuscripts containing the text of this chapter in Hebrew are of the Masoretic Text tradition, which includes the Aleppo Codex (10th century), and Codex Leningradensis (1008).

There is also a translation into Koine Greek known as the Septuagint, made in the last few centuries BCE. Extant ancient manuscripts of the Septuagint version include Codex Vaticanus (B; $\mathfrak{G}$^{B}; 4th century), and Codex Alexandrinus (A; $\mathfrak{G}$^{A}; 5th century). (Note: The whole book of 2 Chronicles is missing from the extant Codex Sinaiticus.)

=== Old Testament references ===
- 2 Chronicles 25:1–4: 2 Kings 14:1–7
- 2 Chronicles 25:17–24: 2 Kings 14:8–14
- 2 Chronicles 25:25–28: 2 Kings 14:17–20

== Amaziah, king of Judah (25:1–16) ==
Verses 1–4 and verse 11 in this section parallel to 2 Kings 14, along by two parts unique to the Chronicler: verses 5–10 and verses 12–16, both involving a prophetic figure. Amaziah's reign could be divided into a period of obedience to YHWH and success (verses 1–13), then a period of idolatry and defeat (verses 14–28).

=== Verse 1 ===
Amaziah was twenty-five years old when he began to reign, and he reigned twenty-nine years in Jerusalem. His mother's name was Jehoaddan of Jerusalem.

- Cross references: 2 Kings 14:2
- "Twenty-nine years": in Thiele's chronology Amaziah became the 9th king of Judah between April and September 796 BCE then died between April and September 767 BCE at the age of 54.

== Jehoash of Israel defeats Amaziah (25:17–28) ==
This section records the consequences of Amaziah worshipping Edomite deities (verses 15, 20: 'it was God's doing'; cf. 2 Chronicles 10:15; 22:7) in form of his defeat to Jehoash of the northern kingdom.

=== Verse 28 ===
And they brought him upon horses, and buried him with his fathers in the city of Judah.

- Cross references: 2 Kings 14:20
- "City of Judah": is "City of David" in 2 Kings 14:20.

== See also ==
- Beth-horon
- Edom
- Obed-Edom
- Jehoash of Israel
- Jerusalem
- Lachish
- Moses
- Samaria
- Valley of Salt
- Related Bible parts: 2 Kings 14, 2 Chronicles 24, 2 Chronicles 26

== Sources ==
- Ackroyd, Peter R (1993). "Chronicles, Books of". In Metzger, Bruce M; Coogan, Michael D (eds.). The Oxford Companion to the Bible. Oxford University Press. pp. 113–116. ISBN 978-0195046458.
- Bennett, William (2018). The Expositor's Bible: The Books of Chronicles. Litres. ISBN 978-5040825196.
- Coogan, Michael David (2007). Coogan, Michael David; Brettler, Marc Zvi; Newsom, Carol Ann; Perkins, Pheme (eds.). The New Oxford Annotated Bible with the Apocryphal/Deuterocanonical Books: New Revised Standard Version, Issue 48 (Augmented 3rd ed.). Oxford University Press. ISBN 9780195288810.
- Mabie, Frederick (2017). "I. The Chronicler's Genealogical Survey of All Israel". In Longman III, Tremper; Garland, David E (eds.). 1 and 2 Chronicles. The Expositor's Bible Commentary. Zondervan. pp. 267–308. ISBN 978-0310531814.
- Mathys, H. P. (2007). "14. 1 and 2 Chronicles". In Barton, John; Muddiman, John (eds.). The Oxford Bible Commentary (first (paperback) ed.). Oxford University Press. pp. 267–308. ISBN 978-0199277186.
- McFall, Leslie (1991), "Translation Guide to the Chronological Data in Kings and Chronicles" (PDF), Bibliotheca Sacra, 148: 3-45, archived from the original (PDF) on 2010-08-27
- Thiele, Edwin R. (1983). The Mysterious Numbers of the Hebrew Kings (3rd ed.). Grand Rapids, Michigan: Zondervan. ISBN 978-0-310-36010-0.
- Würthwein, Ernst (1995). The Text of the Old Testament. Translated by Rhodes, Erroll F. Grand Rapids, MI: William B. Eerdmans. ISBN 0-8028-0788-7.
