= Richard D. Nelson =

American Old Testament scholar (born 1945)

The Reverend Richard D. Nelson
- Born: Richard Donald Nelson; 1945 (age 80–81)

Ecclesiastical career
- Religion: Christianity (Lutheran)
- Church: Evangelical Lutheran Church in America

Academic background
- Education: Capital University; Trinity Lutheran Seminary; Union Theological Seminary in Virginia
- Thesis: The Redactional Duality of the Deuteronomistic History (1973)
- Academic advisors: Patrick D. Miller, John Bright

Academic work
- Discipline: Biblical studies
- Sub-discipline: Old Testament studies
- Institutions: Ferrum College; Lutheran Theological Seminary at Gettysburg; Southern Methodist University
- Notable students: K. L. Noll

Richard Donald Nelson (born 1945) is an American Old Testament scholar. He is W. J. A. Power Professor of Biblical Hebrew and Old Testament and Associate Dean for Academic Affairs at Perkins School of Theology at Southern Methodist University.

Nelson studied at Capital University, Trinity Lutheran Seminary, and Union Theological Seminary in Virginia. Before coming to Perkins, he served as a pastor in the Evangelical Lutheran Church in America, and then as assistant professor of religion at Ferrum College and Kraft Professor of Biblical Studies at Lutheran Theological Seminary at Gettysburg.

Nelson has written commentaries on Deuteronomy, Joshua, and the Book of Kings. In 2010, a Festschrift was published in his honor: Raising Up a Faithful Exegete: Essays in Honor of Richard D. Nelson, which included contributions from Niels Peter Lemche, Kurt Noll, and Ralph W. Klein.

In 2014 he published Historical Roots of the Old Testament (1200–63 BCE) (Atlanta: Society of Biblical Literature Press) in which he listed some of the most important extra-biblical sources relevant for a scholarly study of the Old Testament.

Nelson was a student of historian John Bright (1908–1995), and was influenced by him in his methodological approach to Old Testament study.
