= Isaiah 37 =

Book of Isaiah, chapter 37

- ← chapter 36 chapter 38 →
- The Great Isaiah Scroll, the best preserved of the biblical scrolls found at Qumran from the second century BC, contains all the verses in this chapter.
- Book: Book of Isaiah
- Hebrew Bible part: Nevi'im
- Order in the Hebrew part: 5
- Category: Latter Prophets
- Christian Bible part: Old Testament
- Order in the Christian part: 23

Isaiah 37 is the thirty-seventh chapter of the Book of Isaiah in the Hebrew Bible or the Old Testament of the Christian Bible. This book contains the prophecies attributed to the prophet Isaiah, and is one of the Books of the Prophets.

== Text ==
The original text was written in Hebrew language. This chapter is divided into 38 verses.

=== Textual witnesses ===
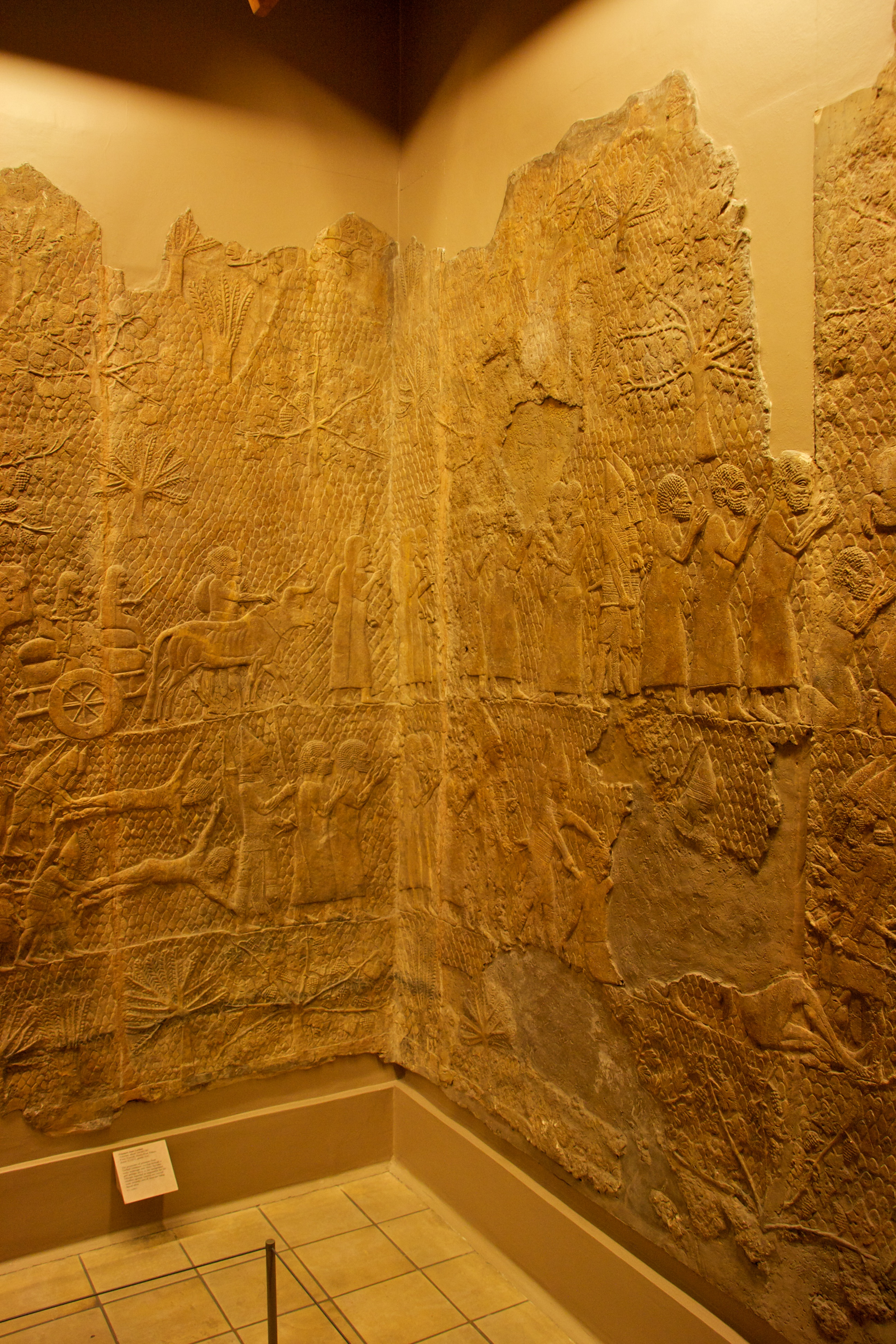
Lachish reliefs, British Museum

Some early manuscripts containing the text of this chapter in Hebrew are of the Masoretic Text tradition, which includes the Codex Cairensis (895), the Petersburg Codex of the Prophets (916), Aleppo Codex (10th century), Codex Leningradensis (1008).

Fragments containing parts of this chapter were found among the Dead Sea Scrolls (3rd century BC or later):

- 1QIsa^{a}: complete
- 1QIsa^{b}: extant verses 7‑13
- 4QIsa^{b} (4Q56): extant verses 29‑32

There is also a translation into Koine Greek known as the Septuagint, made in the last few centuries BC. Extant ancient manuscripts of the Septuagint version include Codex Vaticanus (B; $\mathfrak{G}$^{B}; 4th century), Codex Sinaiticus (S; BHK: $\mathfrak{G}$^{S}; 4th century), Codex Alexandrinus (A; $\mathfrak{G}$^{A}; 5th century) and Codex Marchalianus (Q; $\mathfrak{G}$^{Q}; 6th century).

== Parashot ==
The parashah sections listed here are based on the Aleppo Codex. Isaiah 37 is a part of the Narrative (Isaiah 36–39). {P}: open parashah; {S}: closed parashah.

{S} 37:1-14 {S} 37:15-32 {S} 37:33-35 {S} 37:36-38 {S}

== Isaiah assures deliverance ==
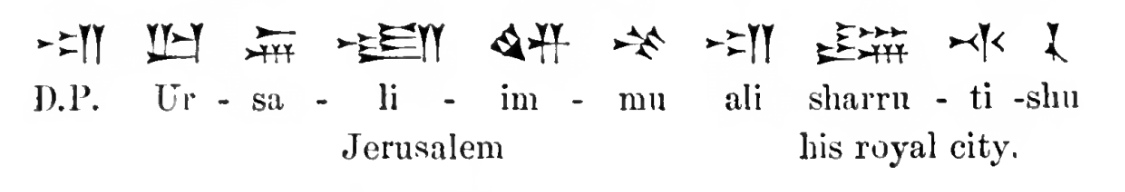
Jerusalem as inscribed on the prism

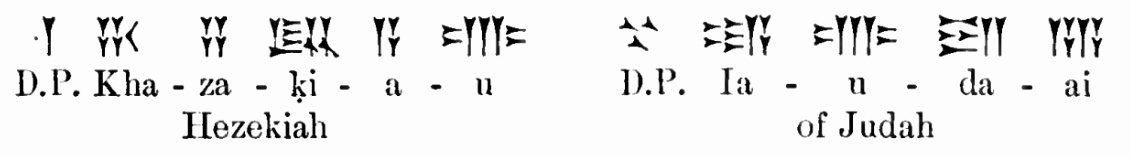
Hezekiah of Judah as inscribed on the prism

The inscription of 'Jerusalem' and 'Hezekiah of Judah' on the prism of Sennacherib's Annals

=== Verse 2 ===
Then he sent Eliakim, who was over the household, Shebna the scribe, and the elders of the priests, covered with sackcloth, to Isaiah the prophet, the son of Amoz.

=== Verse 3 ===
This is the message which he told them to give to Isaiah:

"Today is a day of suffering; we are being punished and are in disgrace.
We are like a woman who is ready to give birth, but is too weak to do it."

A proverbial expression reflecting powerlessness.

=== Verses 6–7 ===
^{6}And Isaiah said to them, "Thus you shall say to your master, 'Thus says the Lord: "Do not be afraid of the words which you have heard, with which the servants of the king of Assyria have blasphemed Me. ^{7} Surely I will send a spirit upon him, and he shall hear a rumor and return to his own land; and I will cause him to fall by the sword in his own land."'"

The promise in verse 7 about 'the king of Assyria' is taken up in verses 36–38 containing the account of its fulfillment.

== Defeat of Sennacherib's army ==
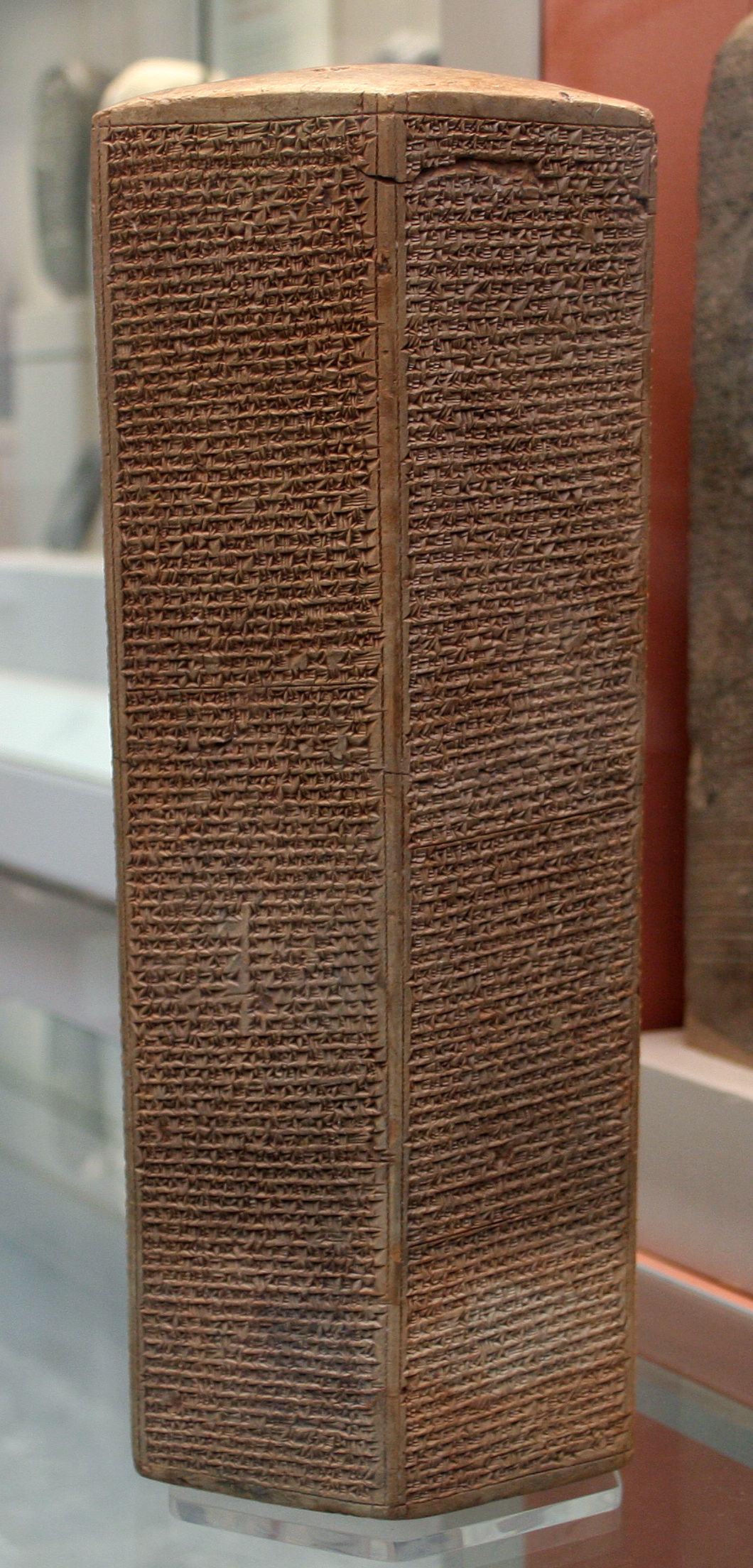
Taylor Prism, London

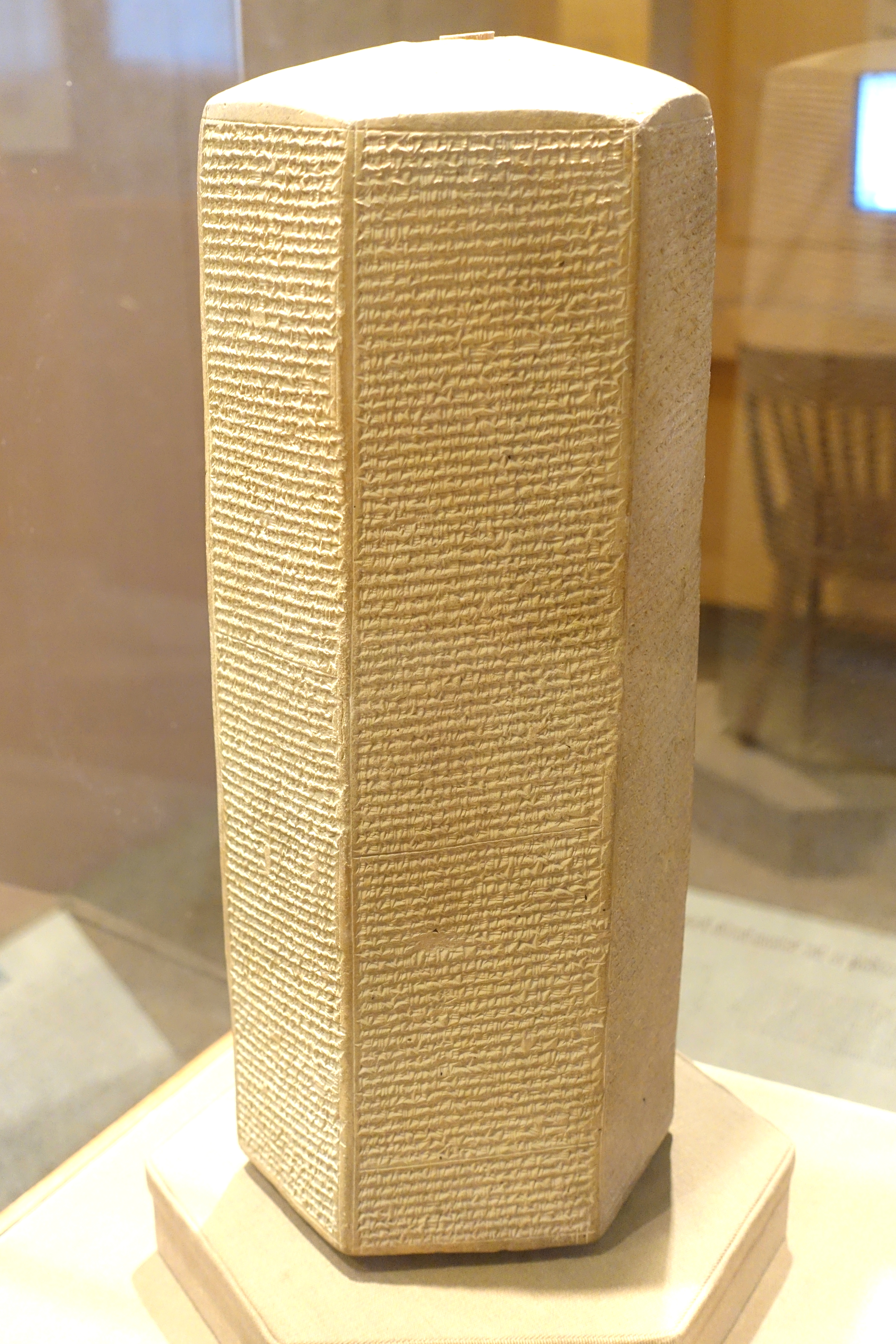
Oriental Institute Prism, Chicago

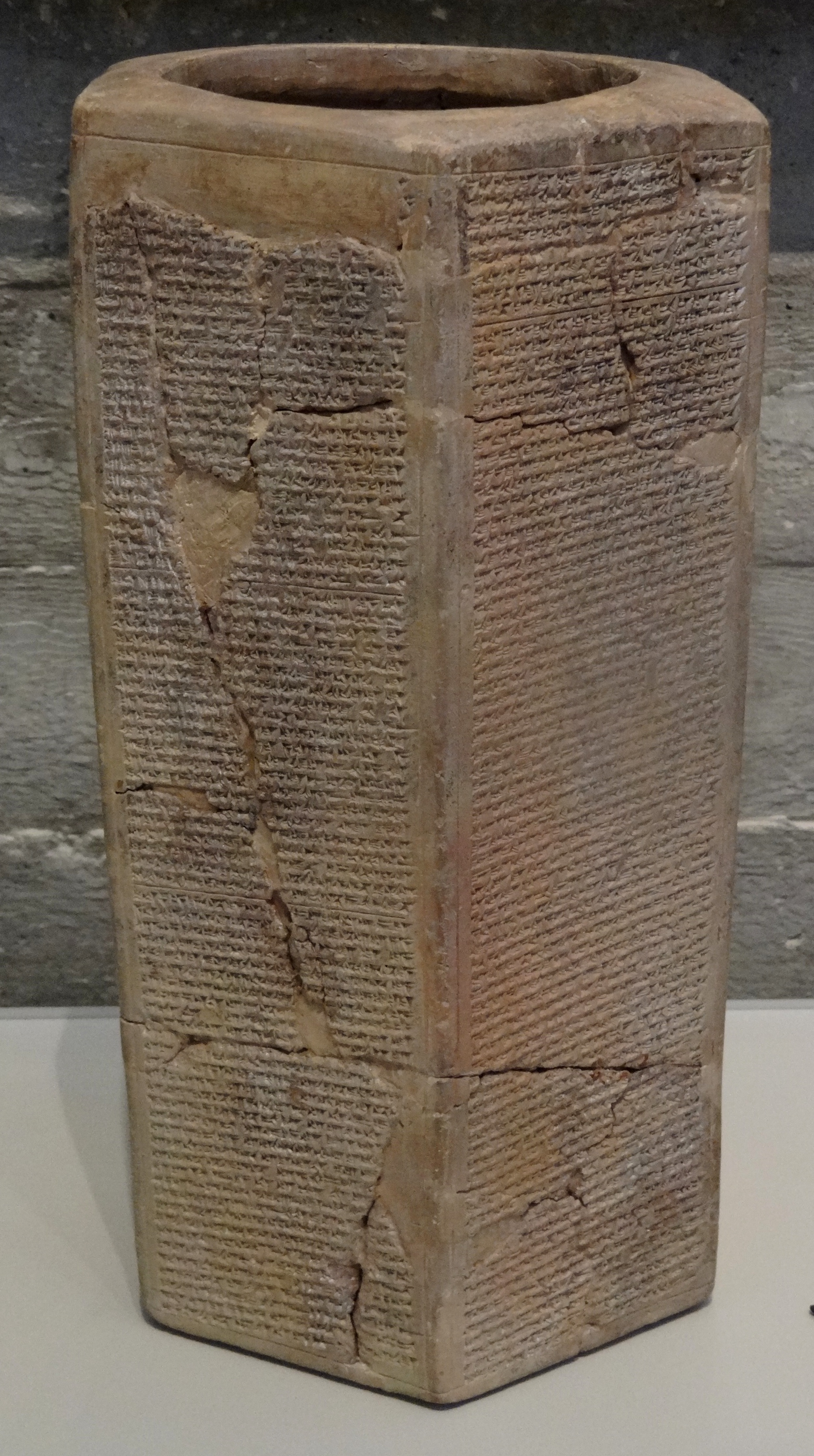
Jerusalem Prism, Israel

Sennacherib's Annals of his military campaign (704–681 BC) include his invasion into the Kingdom of Judah.

=== Verse 36 ===
Then the angel of the Lord went out, and killed in the camp of the Assyrians one hundred and eighty-five thousand; and when people arose early in the morning, there were the corpses—all dead.

== Epilogue ==
=== Verse 38 ===
And it came to pass, as he was worshipping in the house of Nisroch his god, that Adrammelech and Sharezer his sons smote him with the sword; and they escaped into the land of Armenia: and Esarhaddon his son reigned in his stead.

According to Assyrian records, Sennacherib was assassinated in 681 BC, twenty years after the 701 BC invasion of Judah.

- "Adrammelech": Identified as the murderer of his father Sennacherib in an Assyrian letter to Esarhaddon (ABL 1091), where he is called Arda-Mulissi.
- "Armenia": or Ararat.

== See also ==
- Babylonian Chronicles
- Eliakim
- Eponym dating system
- Esarhaddon
- Hezekiah
- Isaiah, son of Amoz
- Jerusalem
- Kingdom of Judah
- Lachish reliefs
- Nevi'im
- Rabshakeh
- Sennacherib
- Sennacherib's Annals
- Shebna
- Tirhakah, king of Ethiopia
- Zion
- Related Bible parts: 2 Kings 18, 2 Kings 19, 2 Kings 20, 2 Chronicles 29, 2 Chronicles 30, 2 Chronicles 31, 2 Chronicles 32, Isaiah 22, Isaiah 30, Isaiah 36, Isaiah 38, Isaiah 39, 1 John 4

== Sources ==
- Coggins, R (2007). "22. Isaiah". In Barton, John; Muddiman, John (eds.). The Oxford Bible Commentary (first (paperback) ed.). Oxford University Press. pp. 433–486. ISBN 978-0199277186.
- Würthwein, Ernst (1995). The Text of the Old Testament. Translated by Rhodes, Erroll F. Grand Rapids, MI: Wm. B. Eerdmans. ISBN 0-8028-0788-7.
