= Abdi (biblical figure) =

Biblical Character

The name Abdi (Hebrew: עַבְדִּי) is probably an abbreviation of Obadiah, meaning "servant of YHWH", according to the International Standard Bible Encyclopedia. Easton's Bible Encyclopedia, on the other hand, holds that it means "my servant". The name "Abdi" appears three times in forms of the Hebrew Bible in use among Jews, Protestants, and Roman Catholics. There is also one additional appearance in 1 Esdras, which is considered canonical in Eastern Orthodox Churches:

- 1 Chronicles 6:29: "And on the left hand their brethren the sons of Merari: Ethan the son of Kishi, the son of Abdi, the son of Malluch." In the King James Version and some other Christian Bible translations, 1 Chronicles 6:29 appears as verse 44 of chapter 6.
- 2 Chronicles 29:12. "Then the Levites arose, Mahath the son of Amasai, and Joel the son of Azariah, of the sons of the Kohathites; and of the sons of Merari, Kish the son of Abdi, and Azariah the son of Jehallelel; and of the Gershonites, Joah the son of Zimmah, and Eden the son of Joah."
- Ezra 10:26. "And of the sons of Elam: Mattaniah, Zechariah, and Jehiel, and Abdi, and Jeremoth, and Elijah."
- 1 Esdras 9:27, in which the name appears in the Hellenized form Oabd[e]ios: "Of the sons of Elam: Matthanias and Zacharias and Iezrielos and Obadios and Ieremoth and Elias."

According to Cheyne and Black (1899), the two occurrences in the books of Chronicles refer to a single individual, and the references in the book of Ezra and 1 Esdras are to a second individual
