= Isaiah 36 =

Book of Isaiah, chapter 36

- ← chapter 35 chapter 37 →
- The Great Isaiah Scroll, the best preserved of the biblical scrolls found at Qumran from the second century BC, contains all the verses in this chapter.
- Book: Book of Isaiah
- Hebrew Bible part: Nevi'im
- Order in the Hebrew part: 5
- Category: Latter Prophets
- Christian Bible part: Old Testament
- Order in the Christian part: 23

Isaiah 36 is the thirty-sixth chapter of the Book of Isaiah in the Hebrew Bible or the Old Testament of the Christian Bible. This book contains the prophecies attributed to the prophet Isaiah, and is one of the Books of the Prophets. The text, describing the invasion of the Assyrian king Sennacherib to the Kingdom of Judah under Hezekiah.

== Text ==
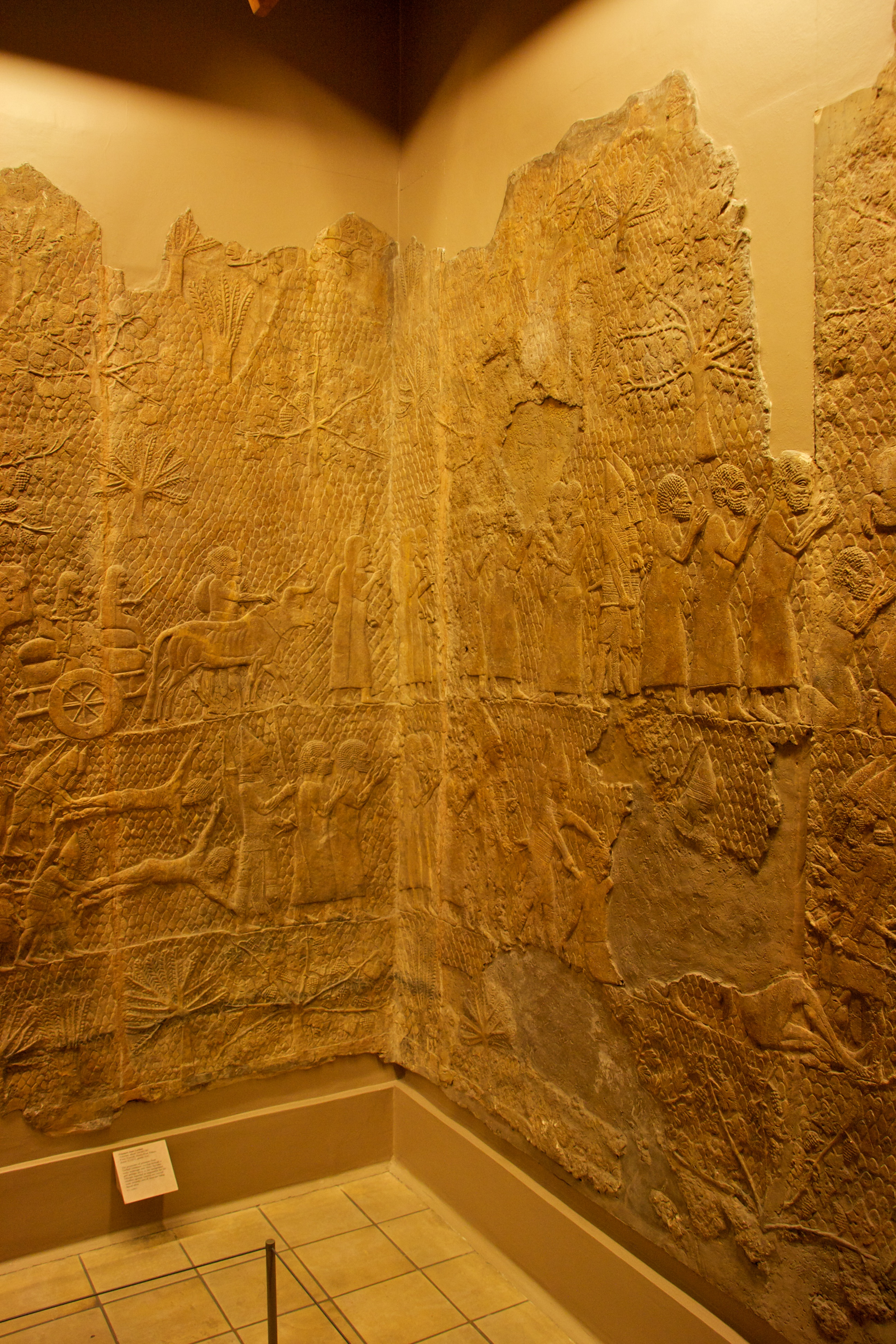
Lachish reliefs, depicting Sennacherib's siege against Lachish. British Museum.

The original text was written in Hebrew language. This chapter is divided into 22 verses.

=== Textual witnesses ===
Some early manuscripts containing the text of this chapter in Hebrew are of the Masoretic Text tradition, which includes the Codex Cairensis (895), the Petersburg Codex of the Prophets (916), Aleppo Codex (10th century), Codex Leningradensis (1008).

Fragments containing parts of this chapter were found among the Dead Sea Scrolls (3rd century BC or later):

- 1QIsa^{a}: complete
- 4QIsa^{b} (4Q56): extant: verses 1–2

There is also a translation into Koine Greek known as the Septuagint, made in the last few centuries BCE. Extant ancient manuscripts of the Septuagint version include Codex Vaticanus (B; $\mathfrak{G}$^{B}; 4th century), Codex Sinaiticus (S; BHK: $\mathfrak{G}$^{S}; 4th century), Codex Alexandrinus (A; $\mathfrak{G}$^{A}; 5th century) and Codex Marchalianus (Q; $\mathfrak{G}$^{Q}; 6th century).

== Parashot ==
The parashah sections listed here are based on the Aleppo Codex. Isaiah 36 is a part of the Narrative (Isaiah 36–39). {P}: open parashah; {S}: closed parashah.

{S} 36:1–10 {S} 36:11–16a {P} 36:16b–22 כי כה אמר {S}

== The Rock of History ==
Chapters 36–37 cuts into the historical narrative in 2 Kings 18:13–19:38 to the time after Hezekiah sent tributes to appease Sennacherib (2 Kings 18:13–16) – a 'treachery' that Isaiah already prophesied several times (Isaiah 21:2; 24:16; 33:1) – yet failed to stop the Assyrians from attacking Jerusalem. This sets up for a demonstration of Yahweh's power, and thus, "put the rock of history under the fabric of eschatology."

== Rabshakeh's first speech: no salvation in faith! (36:1–10) ==
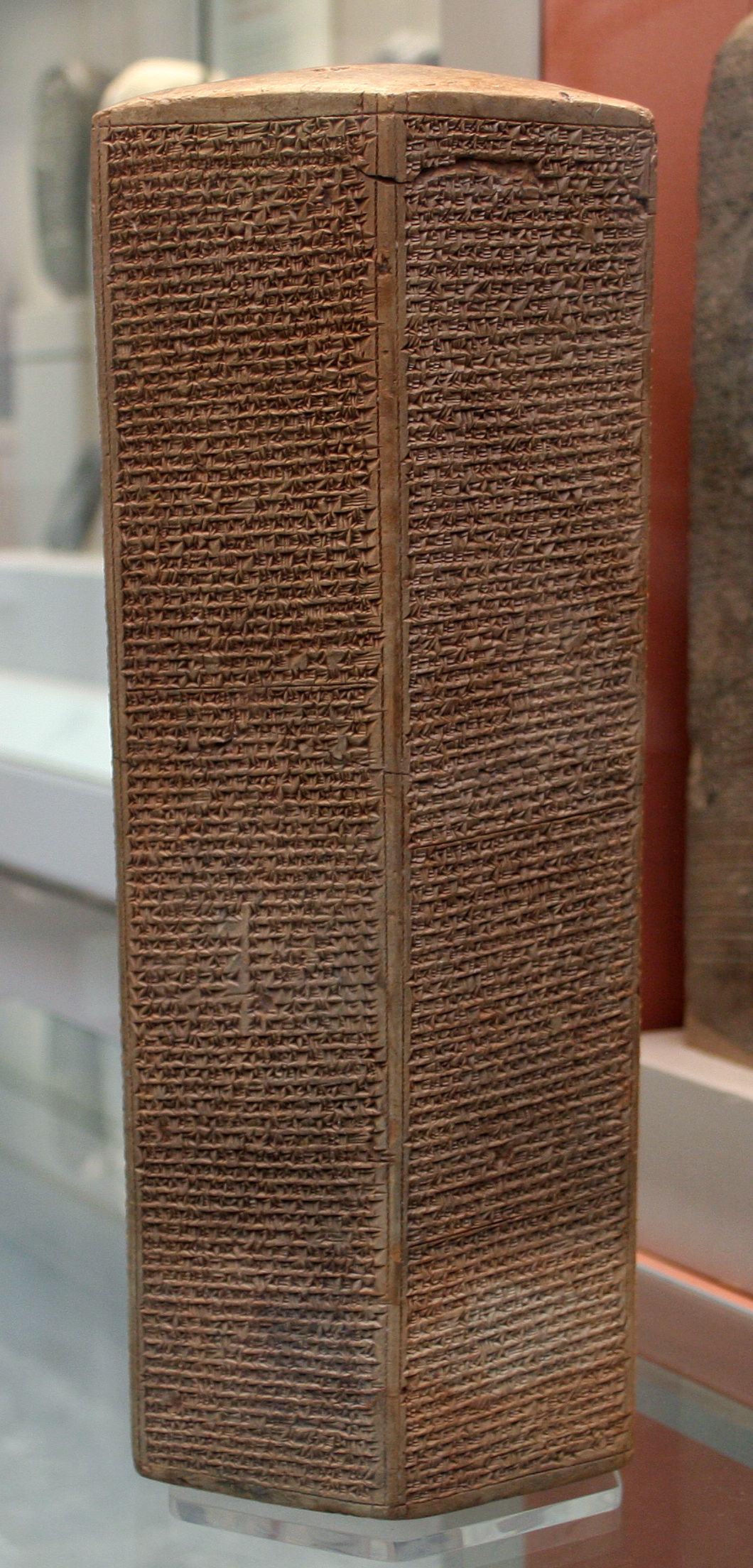
Taylor Prism, London

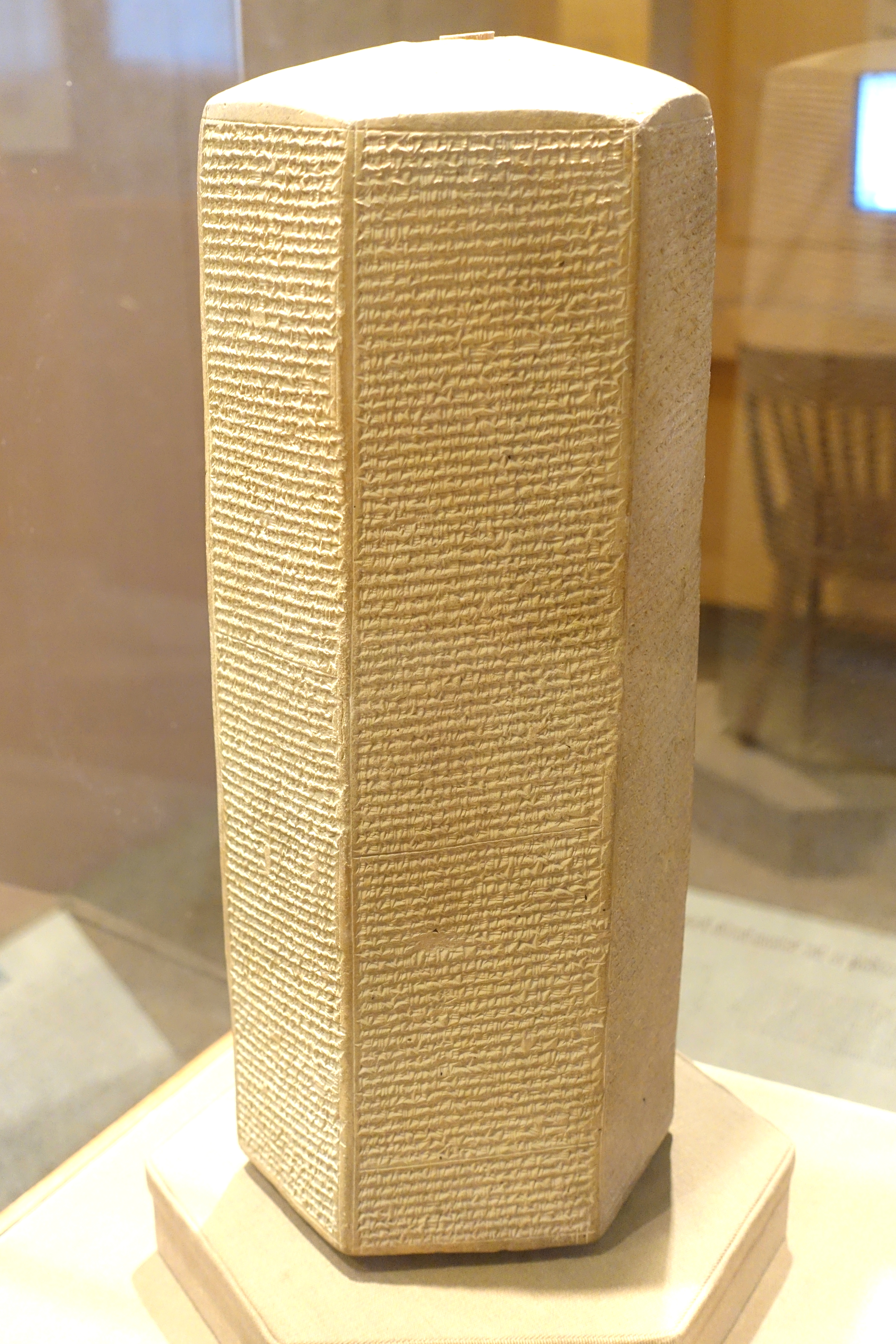
Oriental Institute Prism, Chicago

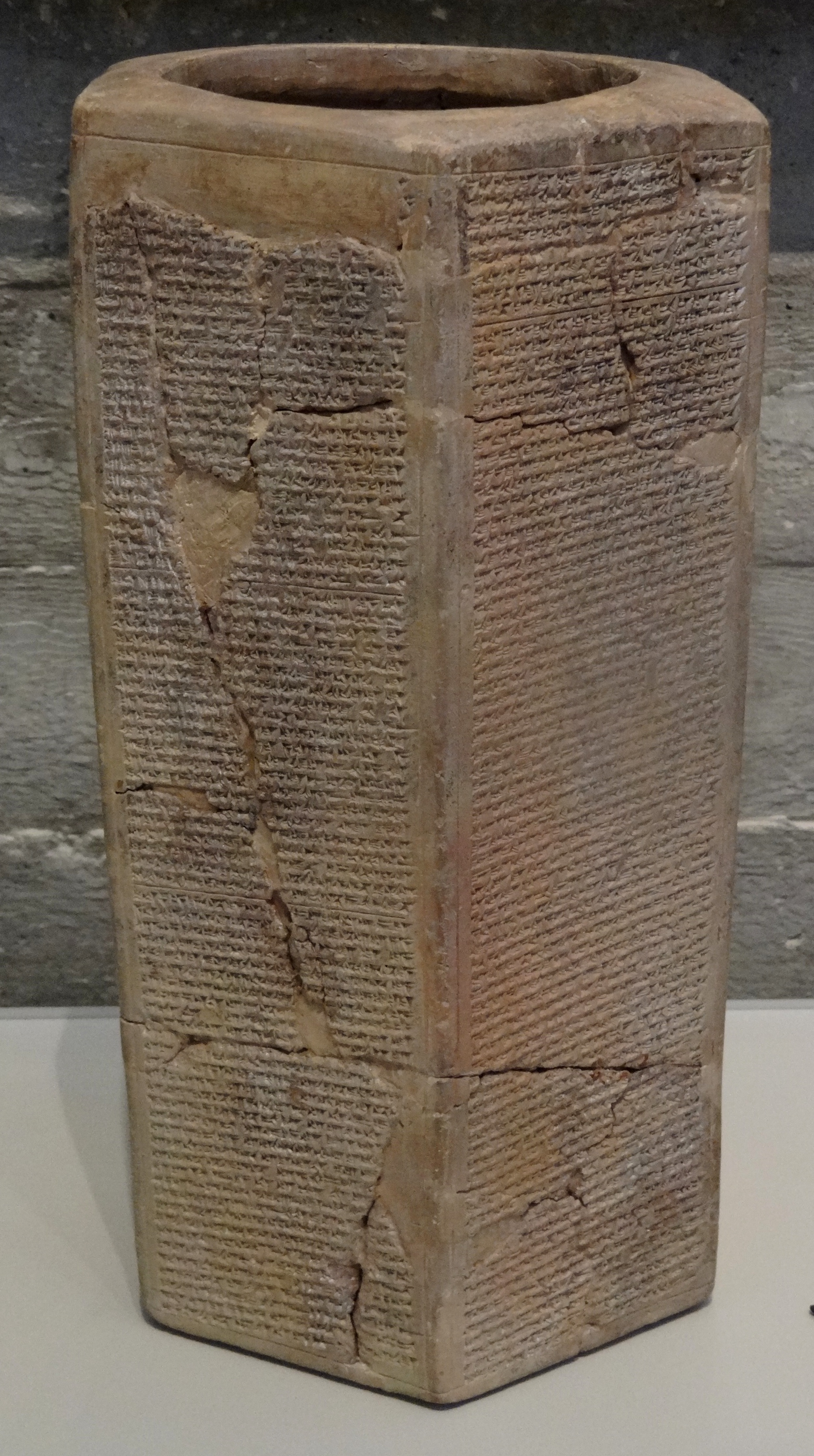
Jerusalem Prism, Israel

Sennacherib's Annals of his military campaign (704–681 BC), including his invasion into the Kingdom of Judah

=== Verse 1 ===
Now it came to pass in the fourteenth year of king Hezekiah, that Sennacherib king of Assyria came up against all the defenced cities of Judah, and took them.

Based on Sennacherib's Annals which contain the record of the same event, the time referred here can be determined to be 701 BCE. The text here omits the admission of defeat and the payment for substantial reparations by Hezekiah to Sennacherib, which is recorded in 2 Kings 18:14–16.

- "Defenced cities": or "fortified cities" of Judah, forty six cities in total, were besieged and captured by Sennacherib, along with many smaller towns, according to the record of his annals.

=== Verse 2 ===
And the king of Assyria sent Rabshakeh from Lachish to Jerusalem to King Hezekiah with a large army. And he stood by the conduit of the upper pool on the highway of the fuller's field.

- "Rabshakeh" (from Hebrew: רבשקה, Rabshaqeh): or "field commander" (also "chief cup-bearer"); perhaps "chief of the officers" among the Assyrian military leaders.
- "The conduit of the upper pool": The confrontation took place at the same location where Isaiah confronted Ahaz in Isaiah 7:3, so it presents a great contrast between 'the renegade behavior of Ahaz and the appropriate response from Hezekiah'.

== Rabshakeh's second speech: popular appeal – 'Make Peace' (36:11–22) ==
In his second speech, the Rabshakeh arrogantly addresses the people directly using the language they understand, reminding them that politicians declare wars, but people bear the suffering (verse 11–13), advising them not to trust Hezekiah with his futile faith in his God (verses 14–17), but then the Rabshakeh continues to equate Israel's god with the gods of other nations and to belittle the god's ability to save Jerusalem (verses 18–20). The people appropriately respond to the arrogance with silence (verse 21).

=== Verse 22 ===
Then came Eliakim, the son of Hilkiah, that was over the household, and Shebna the scribe, and Joah, the son of Asaph, the recorder, to Hezekiah with their clothes rent, and told him the words of Rabshakeh.

- "With their clothes rent": A common display of grief among the Jews (cf. 2 Samuel 3:31; 1 Kings 21:27; Ezra 9:3; Job 1:20; Job 2:12; Jeremiah 36:24; also in the New Testament period: Matthew 26:65; Acts 14:14).

== See also ==
- Babylonian Chronicles
- Eponym dating system
- Kingdom of Judah
- Pool of Bethesda
- Related Bible parts: 2 Kings 18, 2 Kings 19, 2 Kings 20, 2 Chronicles 29, 2 Chronicles 30, 2 Chronicles 31, 2 Chronicles 32, Isaiah 22, Isaiah 30, Isaiah 37, Isaiah 38, Isaiah 39, 1 John 4

== Sources ==
- Coggins, R (2007). "22. Isaiah". In Barton, John; Muddiman, John (eds.). The Oxford Bible Commentary (first (paperback) ed.). Oxford University Press. pp. 433–486. ISBN 978-0199277186.
- Motyer, J. Alec (2015). The Prophecy of Isaiah: An Introduction & Commentary. InterVarsity Press. ISBN 9780830895243.
- Würthwein, Ernst (1995). The Text of the Old Testament. Translated by Rhodes, Erroll F. Grand Rapids, MI: Wm. B. Eerdmans. ISBN 0-8028-0788-7.
