= Isaiah 38 =

Book of Isaiah, chapter 38

- ← chapter 37 chapter 39 →
- The Great Isaiah Scroll, the best preserved of the biblical scrolls found at Qumran from the second century BC, contains all the verses in this chapter.
- Book: Book of Isaiah
- Hebrew Bible part: Nevi'im
- Order in the Hebrew part: 5
- Category: Latter Prophets
- Christian Bible part: Old Testament
- Order in the Christian part: 23

Isaiah 38 is the thirty-eighth chapter of the Book of Isaiah in the Hebrew Bible or the Old Testament of the Christian Bible. This book contains the prophecies attributed to the prophet Isaiah, and is one of the Books of the Prophets.

== Text ==
The original text was written in Hebrew language. This chapter is divided into 22 verses.

=== Textual witnesses ===
Some early manuscripts containing the text of this chapter in Hebrew are of the Masoretic Text tradition, which includes the Codex Cairensis (895), the Petersburg Codex of the Prophets (916), Aleppo Codex (10th century), Codex Leningradensis (1008).

Fragments containing parts of this chapter were found among the Dead Sea Scrolls (3rd century BC or later):

- 1QIsa^{a}: complete
- 1QIsa^{b}: extant: verses 12, 14‑22

There is also a translation into Koine Greek known as the Septuagint, made in the last few centuries BCE. Extant ancient manuscripts of the Septuagint version include Codex Vaticanus (B; $\mathfrak{G}$^{B}; 4th century), Codex Sinaiticus (S; BHK: $\mathfrak{G}$^{S}; 4th century), Codex Alexandrinus (A; $\mathfrak{G}$^{A}; 5th century) and Codex Marchalianus (Q; $\mathfrak{G}$^{Q}; 6th century).

== Parashot ==
The parashah sections listed here are based on the Aleppo Codex. Isaiah 38 is a part of the Narrative (Isaiah 36–39). {P}: open parashah; {S}: closed parashah.

{S} 38:1-3 {S} 38:4-8 {S} 38:9-22 {S}

== Verse 8 ==
Behold, I will bring again the shadow of the degrees, which is gone down in the sun dial of Ahaz, ten degrees backward. So the sun returned ten degrees, by which degrees it was gone down.

In the parallel account in the Second Book of Kings, Hezekiah is given a choice of whether to see the shadow move forward ten degrees or move backward ten degrees, and he chooses the more challenging backward option.

== Canticle ==
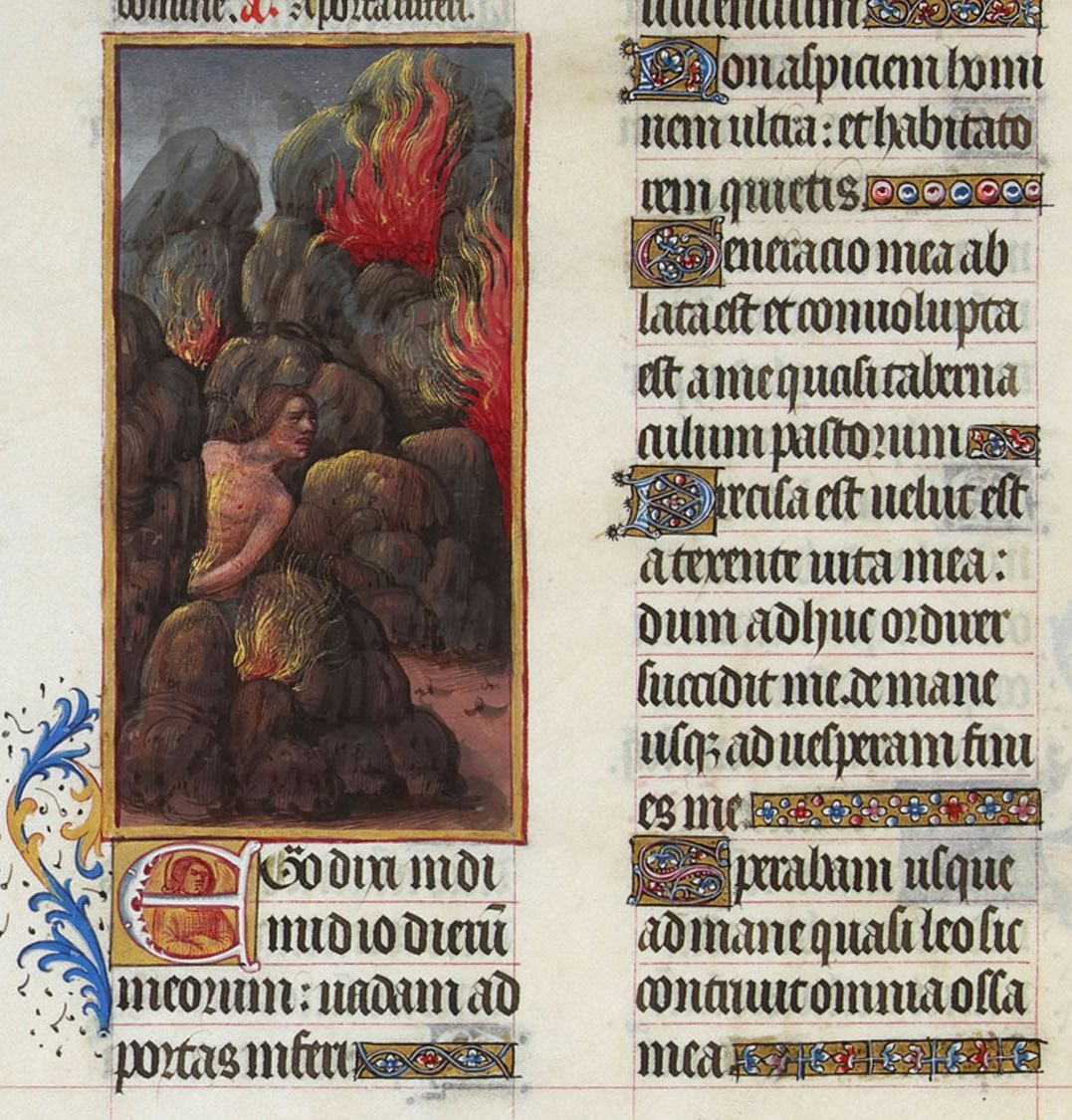
Hezekiah's Canticle, folio 103v of the Très Riches Heures du Duc de Berry.

Verses 10 to 20 are also known as the Song of Hezekiah or Canticle of Ezechias, with the incipit ego dixi ("I said"), appearing in the Roman Breviary for Lauds on Tuesdays, and also in the Office of the Dead.

== Verse 21 ==
One of the salient features of this chapter is found in verse 21 (repeated in 2 Kings 20:7), where the prophet Isaiah instructs physicians to take-up a fig-cake and to rub it over Hezekiah's boil (וַיֹּאמֶר יְשַׁעְיָהוּ יִשְׂאוּ דְּבֶלֶת תְּאֵנִים וְיִמְרְחוּ עַל הַשְּׁחִין וְיֶחִי, Now Isaiah had said, 'Let them take a cake of figs and apply it to the boil, that he may recover.).

The rabbis, in their homiletical explanations, explain the action of taking a fig-cake and rubbing it over a boil as being a "miracle within a miracle", since the act of rubbing a boil with figs has the ordinary effect of aggravating a skin-condition, and, yet, Hezekiah was cured of his skin-condition.

== See also ==
- Ahaz
- Hezekiah
- Isaiah, son of Amoz
- Jerusalem
- Kingdom of Judah
- Related Bible parts: Exodus 9, Leviticus 13, Deuteronomy 28, 2 Kings 20, 2 Chronicles 32, Job 2, Isaiah 39, Jeremiah 8, Jonah 3

== Bibliography ==
- Würthwein, Ernst (1995). The Text of the Old Testament. Translated by Rhodes, Erroll F. Grand Rapids, MI: Wm. B. Eerdmans. ISBN 0-8028-0788-7.
