= 2 Chronicles 32 =

Second Book of Chronicles, chapter 32

- ← chapter 31 chapter 33 →
- The complete Hebrew text of the Books of Chronicles (1st and 2nd Chronicles) in the Leningrad Codex (1008 CE).
- Book: Books of Chronicles
- Category: Ketuvim
- Christian Bible part: Old Testament
- Order in the Christian part: 14

2 Chronicles 32 is the thirty-second chapter of the Second Book of Chronicles in the Old Testament in the Christian Bible or of the second part of the Books of Chronicles in the Hebrew Bible. The book is compiled from older sources by an unknown person or group, designated by modern scholars as "the Chronicler", and had its final shape in late fifth or fourth century BCE. This chapter belongs to the section focusing on the kingdom of Judah until its destruction by the Babylonians under Nebuchadnezzar II and the beginning of restoration under Cyrus the Great of Persia (2 Chronicles 10 to 36). The focus of this chapter is the reign of Hezekiah, king of Judah.

== Text ==
This chapter was originally written in the Hebrew language and is divided into 33 verses.

=== Textual witnesses ===
Some early manuscripts containing the text of this chapter in Hebrew are of the Masoretic Text tradition, which includes the Codex Leningradensis (1008). (Note: Since 1947 the current text of Aleppo Codex is missing 2 Chronicles 26:19–35:7.)

There is also a translation into Koine Greek known as the Septuagint, made in the last few centuries BCE. Extant ancient manuscripts of the Septuagint version include Codex Vaticanus (B; $\mathfrak{G}$^{B}; 4th century), and Codex Alexandrinus (A; $\mathfrak{G}$^{A}; 5th century). (Note: The whole book of 2 Chronicles is missing from the extant Codex Sinaiticus.)

=== Old Testament references ===
- 2 Chronicles 32:1–8: 2 Kings 18:13–16; Psalm 46:1–11
- 2 Chronicles 32:9–19: 1 Kings 18:17–37; Isaiah 36:1–22
- 2 Chronicles 32:20–23: 1 Kings 19:35–37; Isaiah 37:36–38
- 2 Chronicles 32:24–31: 2 Kings 20:1–11; Isaiah 38:1–8

== Sennacherib invades Judah (32:1–19) ==
Owing to his diligence in performing the reform, Hezekiah was rewarded in the form of deliverance from Sennacherib, 'after these things and these acts of faithfulness' (no mention of 'the fourteenth year of his reign' as in 2 Kings 18). Hezekiah made efforts on military defence measures (cf. 2 Kings 20:20; Isaiah 22:8–11), concentrating on securing the water supply, carrying out the necessary building works, acquiring required weaponry, and organizing his army. He repaired the infrastructure of Jerusalem, including the construction of Siloam water tunnel (cf. 2 Chronicles 32:30), and initiated a program of 'urban mobilization'.

=== Verse 3 ===
He took counsel with his princes and his mighty men to stop the waters of the fountains which were without the city: and they did help him.

- "The fountains which were without the city": were identified as 'En Rogel, on the Ophel spur or very large mound, or fortified hill' ("tower"; cf. 2 Kings 5:24; Isaiah 32:14), on the southeast of the temple.

=== Verse 5 ===
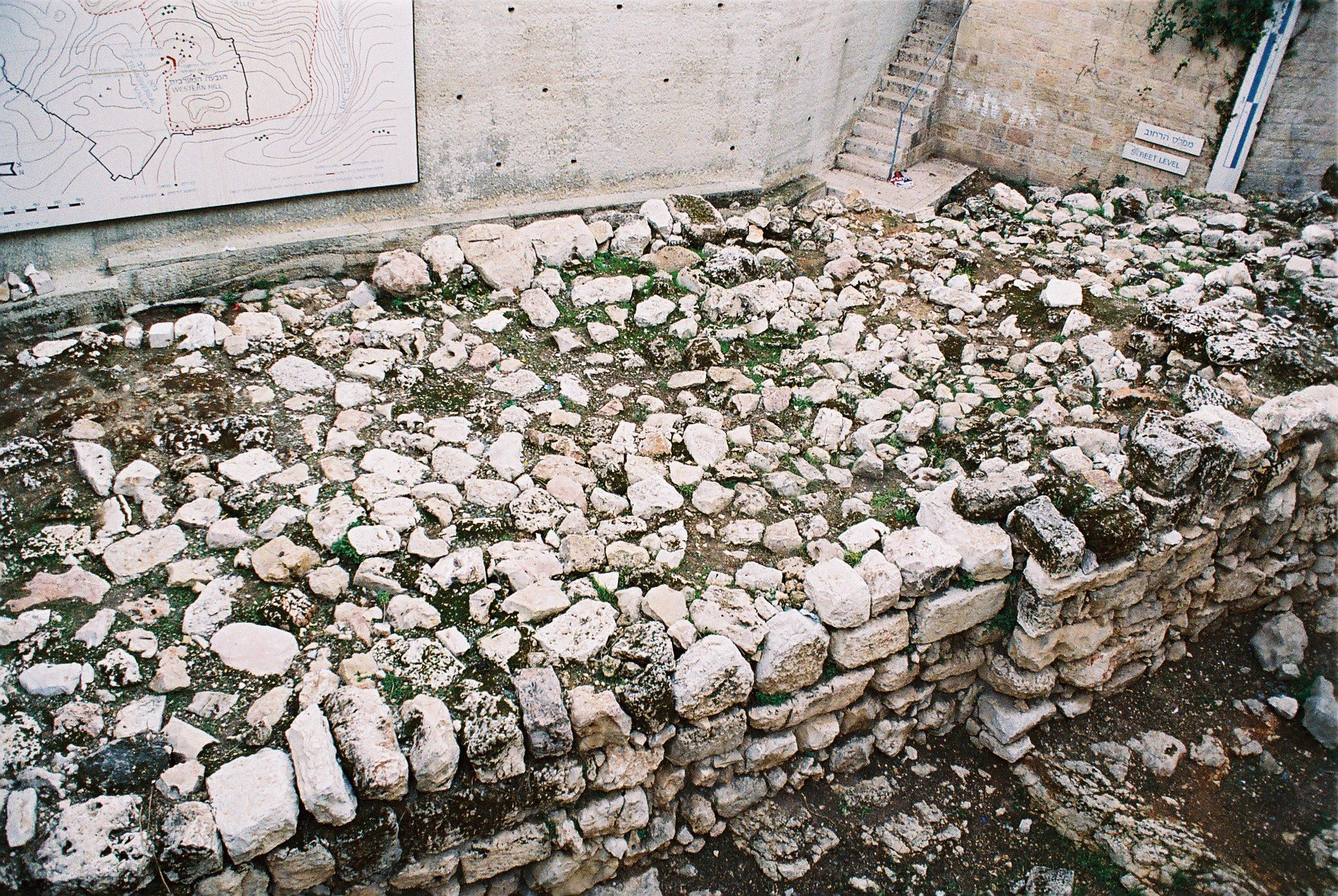
Remnants of the broad wall built during Hezekiah's days against Sennacherib's siege. Excavated at the old city of Jerusalem, Israel.

Also he strengthened himself, and built up all the wall that was broken, and raised it up to the towers, and another wall without, and repaired Millo in the city of David, and made darts and shields in abundance.

- "Built up all the wall that was broken": mentioned in Isaiah 22:9–10 that speaks of "many breaches" and about "houses were pulled down to fortify the wall."
- "Millo" or "the landfills"
- "Darts" or "javelins"

== Death of Sennacherib (32:20–23) ==
The Chronicler records a shorter report than the books of Kings and the book of Isaiah, generally focusing on the emphasis that Hezekiah's and Jerusalem's (aid and) salvation is due to YHWH (verse 21: 'And the LORD sent an angel'; cf. 2 Kings 19:35–37 and Isaiah 37:36, which only mention the angel as the active party). The prophecy of Isaiah, the number of the Assyrians killed and the names of Sennacherib's sons were not recorded in the Chronicles. The text simply states that the whole Assyrian army was annihilated, so Sennacherib had to return with 'shame of face' (cf. Ezra 9:7; Psalm 44:16) to his land, where his sons slew him in the temple.

=== Verse 21 ===
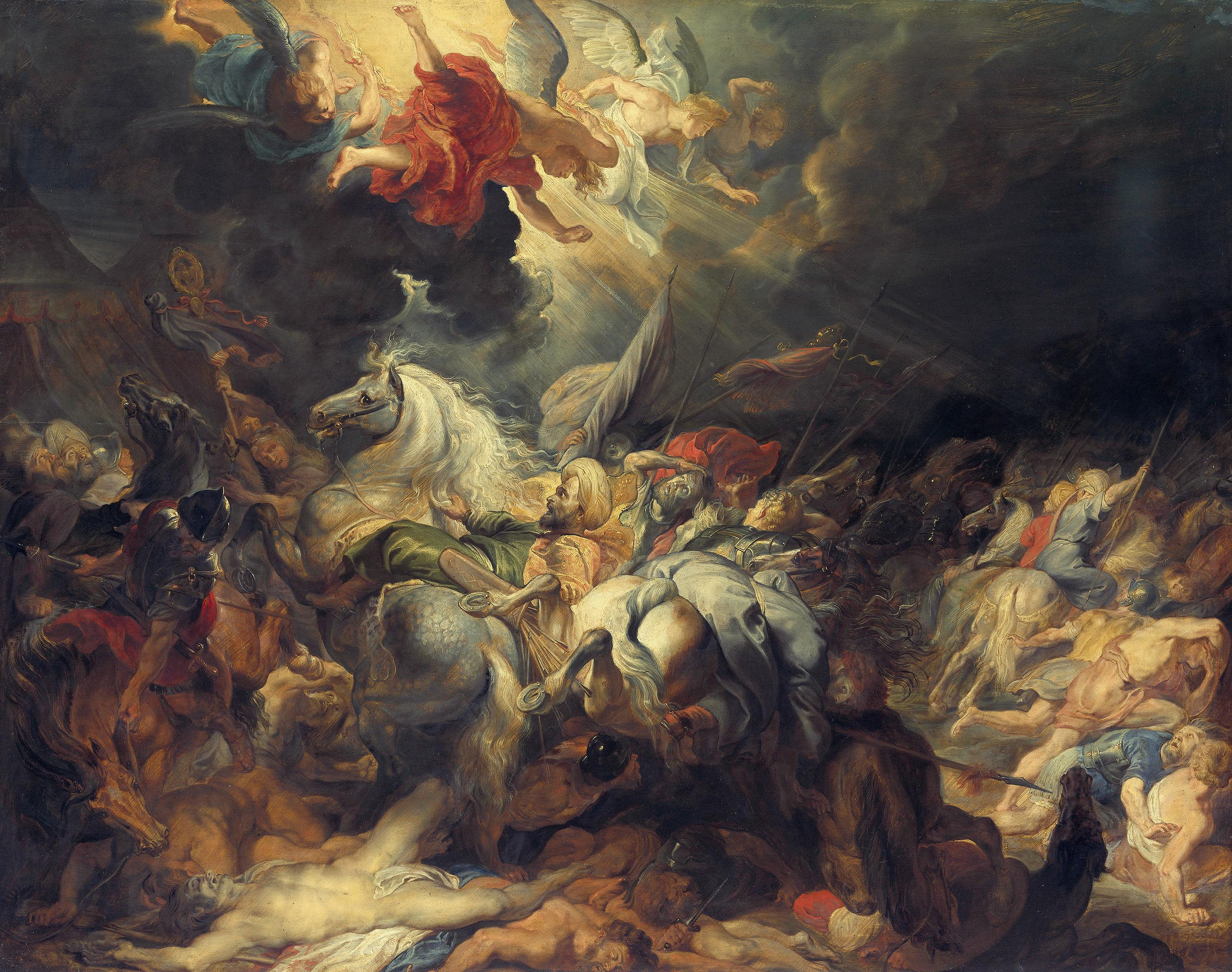
The Defeat of Sennacherib, oil on panel by Peter Paul Rubens, seventeenth century

And the Lord sent an angel, which cut off all the mighty men of valour, and the leaders and captains in the camp of the king of Assyria. So he returned with shame of face to his own land. And when he was come into the house of his god, they that came forth of his own bowels slew him there with the sword.

Herodotus wrote that the Assyrian army was overrun by mice when attacking Egypt. Some Biblical scholars take this to an allusion that the Assyrian army suffered the effects of a mouse- or rat-borne disease such as bubonic plague. Even without relying on that explanation, John Bright suggested it was an epidemic of some kind that saved Jerusalem. In What If?, a collection of essays on counterfactual history, historian Willian H. McNeill speculates that the accounts of mass death among the Assyrian army in the Tanakh might be explained by an outbreak of cholera (or other water-borne diseases) due to the springs beyond the city walls having been blocked, thus depriving the besieging force of a safe water supply.

== Hezekiah’s shortcomings (32:24–31) ==
Despite experiencing vast wealth and strong economy for being God-fearing, Hezekiah was not without faults (2 Chronicles 32:24–26; cf. 2 Kings 20:1–19; Isaiah 38–39; "there is no one who does not sin" in 2 Chronicles 6:36), but like David, (1 Chronicles 21:8, 17) and Rehoboam (2 Chronicles 12:7), Hezekiah prayed and humbled himself before God (cf. 2 Chronicles 7:14), so that the wrath of God did not come during his reign.

=== Verse 30 ===
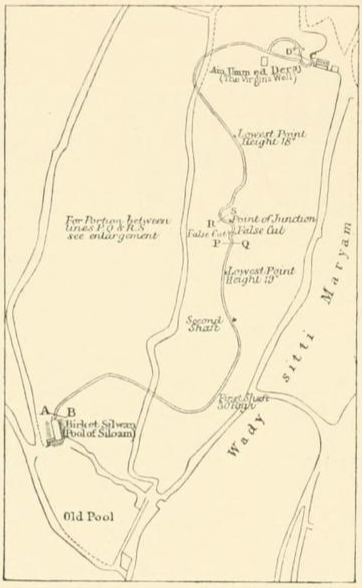
1884 sketch of the tunnel, by Charles Warren and Claude Reignier Conder, showing the Siloam tunnel as well as Warren's Shaft, the Pool of Siloam and the Fountain of the Virgin.

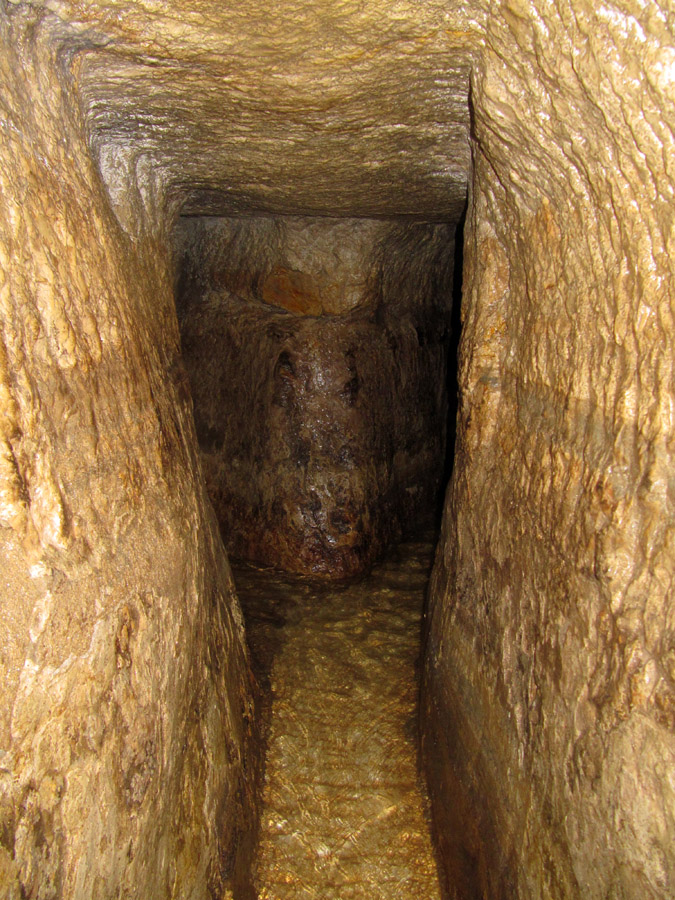
Siloam Tunnel in 2010

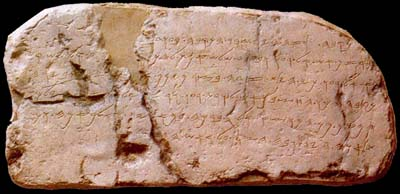
Siloam inscription

This same Hezekiah also stopped the upper watercourse of Gihon, and brought it straight down to the west side of the city of David. And Hezekiah prospered in all his works.

- Cross references: 2 Kings 20:20
- "The upper watercourse of Gihon": one of the two streams from a rivulet near Jerusalem, the upper one was brought into the "upper pool" (Isaiah 7:3) and the lower one to the "lower pool" (Isaiah 22:9). Hezekiah diverted the upper stream through a tunnel into Jerusalem, straight down to the city of David.

The tunnel (now called the "Siloam tunnel") leads from the Gihon Spring to the Pool of Siloam. The curving tunnel is 583 yards (533 m; about 1/3 mile) long and by using the 12 inch (30 cm) altitude difference between its two ends, which corresponds to a 0.06 percent gradient, the engineers managed to convey the water from the spring to the pool. According to the Siloam inscription, the tunnel was excavated by two teams, one starting at each end of the tunnel and then meeting in the middle. The inscription is partly unreadable at present, and may originally have conveyed more information than this. It is clear from the tunnel itself that several directional errors were made during its construction. Support for the dating to Hezekiah's period is derived from the radiocarbon dates of organic matter contained in the original plastering.

== Death of Hezekiah (32:32–33) ==
This section contains the concluding verdict on Hezekiah's reign, especially his 'good deeds', that are recorded in the book of Isaiah and the books of Kings. Hezekiah's burial was one of the most impressive among those given to kings in the Chronicles.

=== Verse 33 ===
And Hezekiah slept with his fathers, and they buried him in the chiefest of the sepulchres of the sons of David: and all Judah and the inhabitants of Jerusalem did him honour at his death. And Manasseh his son reigned in his stead.

- "Slept with his fathers": or "died and joined his ancestors".

== Extrabiblical documentation ==
=== Hezekiah ===
Stamped bulla sealed by a servant of King Hezekiah, Redondo Beach.

Extra-biblical sources specify Hezekiah by name, along with his reign and influence. "Historiographically, his reign is noteworthy for the convergence of a variety of biblical sources and diverse extrabiblical evidence often bearing on the same events. Significant data concerning Hezekiah appear in the Deuteronomistic History, the Chronicler, Isaiah, Assyrian annals and reliefs, Israelite epigraphy, and, increasingly, stratigraphy". Archaeologist Amihai Mazar calls the tensions between Assyria and Judah "one of the best-documented events of the Iron Age" and Hezekiah's story is one of the best to cross-reference with the rest of the Mid Eastern world's historical documents.

Several bullae bearing the name of Hezekiah have been found:

1. a royal bulla with the inscription in ancient Hebrew script: "Belonging to Hezekiah [son of] Ahaz king of Judah" (between 727 and 698 BCE).
2. seals with the inscription: "Belonging to [the] servant of Hezekiah"

Other artifacts bearing the name "Hezekiah" include LMLK stored jars along the border with Assyria "demonstrate careful preparations to counter Sennacherib's likely route of invasion" and show "a notable degree of royal control of towns and cities which would facilitate Hezekiah's destruction of rural sacrificial sites and his centralization of worship in Jerusalem". Evidence suggests they were used throughout his 29-year reign and the Siloam inscription.

=== Sennacherib ===
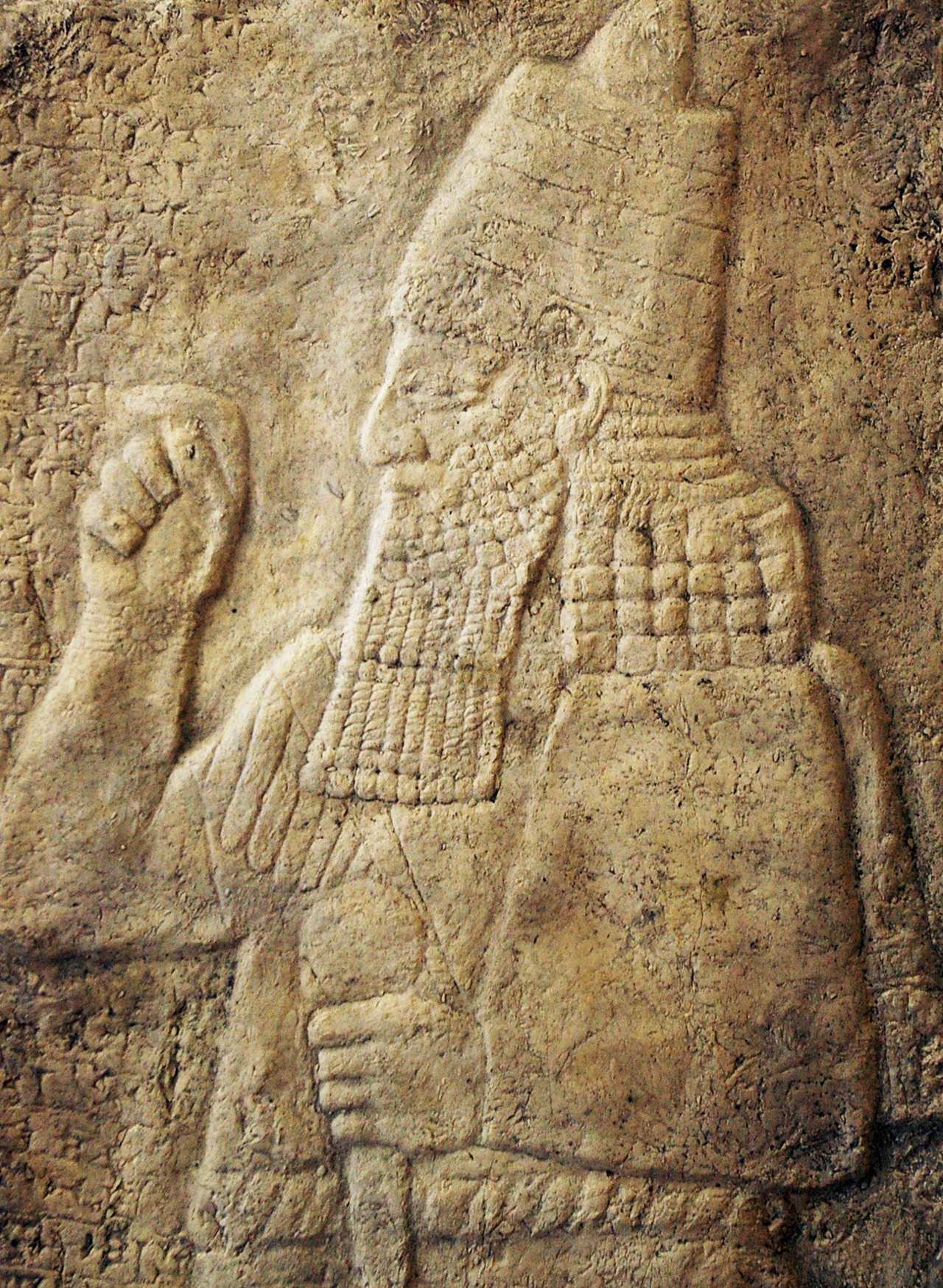
Cast of a rock relief of Sennacherib from the foot of Mount Judi, near Cizre.

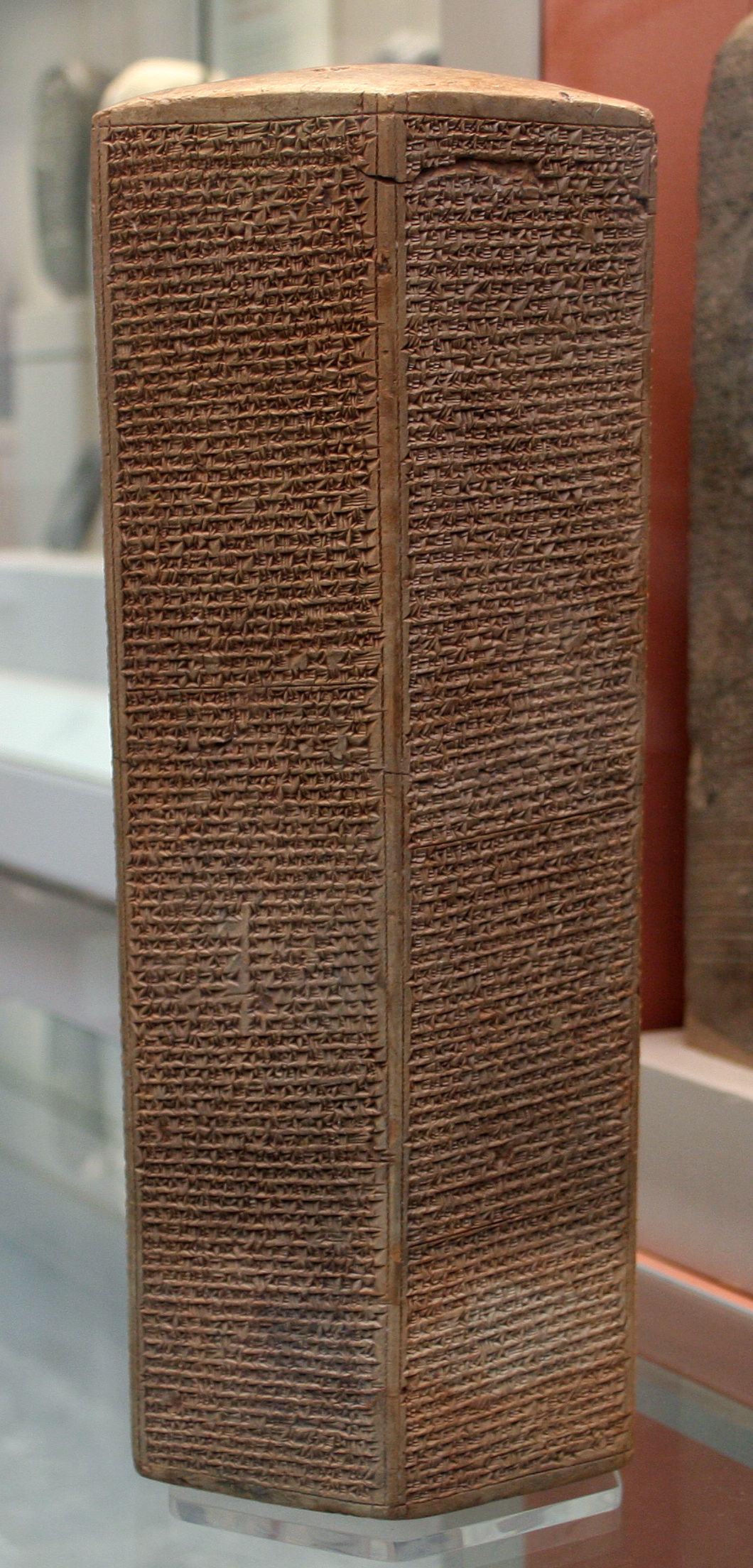
Taylor Prism, London

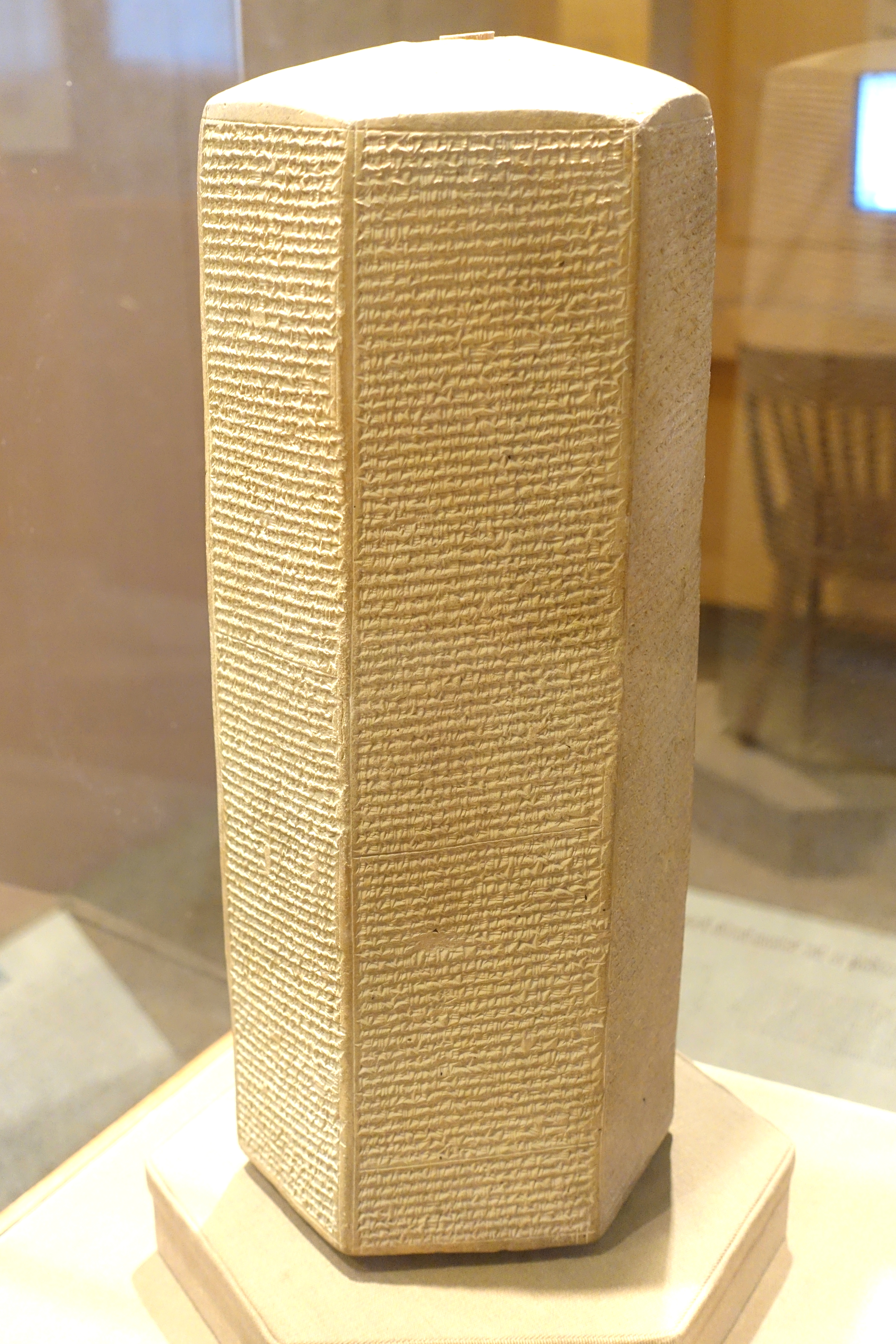
Oriental Institute Prism, Chicago

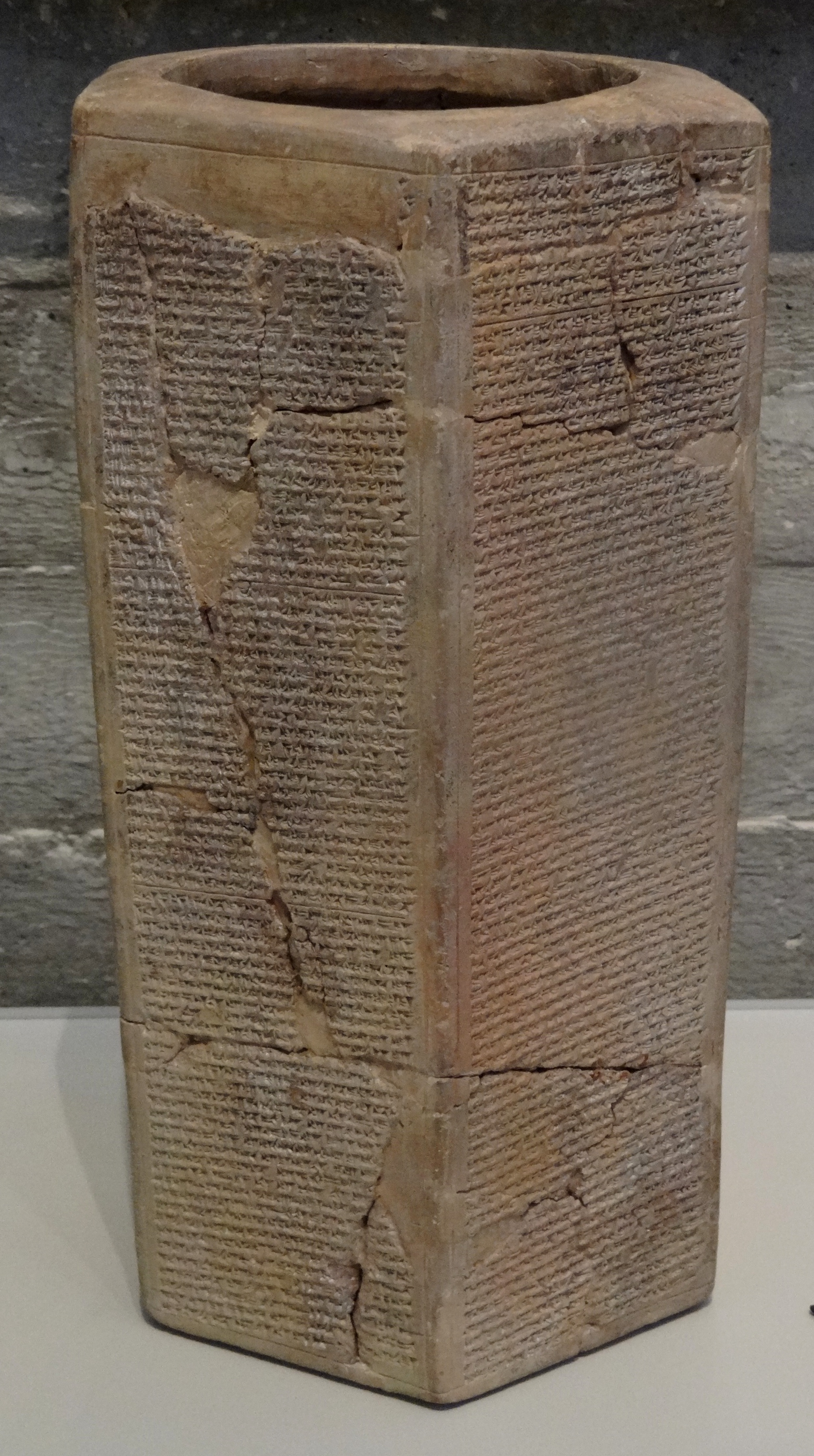
Jerusalem Prism, Israel

Sennacherib's Annals of his military campaign (704–681 BCE), including his invasion into the Kingdom of Judah

The accounts of Sennacherib of Assyria, including his invasion into the Kingdom of Judah, especially the capture of Lachish and the siege of Jerusalem, are recorded in a number of ancient documents and artifacts:

- Lachish reliefs from his palace in Nineveh
- Prisms containing the annals of the Assyrians (Sennacherib's Annals)
- Traces of Assyrian siege around the location of ancient Lachish.and the uncovered walls near the Tel Lachish digs, which fit the descriptions shown in the Lachish reliefs.

== See also ==
- Assyria
- Assyrian Siege of Jerusalem
- Babylon
- David
- Gihon
- Isaiah
- Jerusalem
- Lachish
- Manasseh
- Millo
- Sennacherib
- Related Bible parts: Leviticus 25, Numbers 35, 2 Kings 18, 2 Kings 19, 2 Chronicles 29, 2 Chronicles 30, 2 Chronicles 31

== Sources ==
- Ackroyd, Peter R (1993). "Chronicles, Books of". In Metzger, Bruce M; Coogan, Michael D (eds.). The Oxford Companion to the Bible. Oxford University Press. pp. 113–116. ISBN 978-0195046458.
- Bennett, William (2018). The Expositor's Bible: The Books of Chronicles. Litres. ISBN 978-5040825196.
- Coogan, Michael David (2007). Coogan, Michael David; Brettler, Marc Zvi; Newsom, Carol Ann; Perkins, Pheme (eds.). The New Oxford Annotated Bible with the Apocryphal/Deuterocanonical Books: New Revised Standard Version, Issue 48 (Augmented 3rd ed.). Oxford University Press. ISBN 9780195288810.
- Mabie, Frederick (2017). "I. The Chronicler's Genealogical Survey of All Israel". In Longman III, Tremper; Garland, David E (eds.). 1 and 2 Chronicles. The Expositor's Bible Commentary. Zondervan. pp. 267–308. ISBN 978-0310531814.
- Mathys, H. P. (2007). "14. 1 and 2 Chronicles". In Barton, John; Muddiman, John (eds.). The Oxford Bible Commentary (first (paperback) ed.). Oxford University Press. pp. 267–308. ISBN 978-0199277186.
- Würthwein, Ernst (1995). The Text of the Old Testament. Translated by Rhodes, Erroll F. Grand Rapids, MI: William B. Eerdmans. ISBN 0-8028-0788-7.
