= 2 Chronicles 31 =

Second Book of Chronicles, chapter 31

- ← chapter 30 chapter 32 →
- The complete Hebrew text of the Books of Chronicles (1st and 2nd Chronicles) in the Leningrad Codex (1008 CE).
- Book: Books of Chronicles
- Category: Ketuvim
- Christian Bible part: Old Testament
- Order in the Christian part: 14

2 Chronicles 31 is the thirty-first chapter of the Second Book of Chronicles the Old Testament in the Christian Bible or of the second part of the Books of Chronicles in the Hebrew Bible. The book is compiled from older sources by an unknown person or group, designated by modern scholars as "the Chronicler", and had the final shape established in late fifth or fourth century BCE. This chapter belongs to the section focusing on the kingdom of Judah until its destruction by the Babylonians under Nebuchadnezzar and the beginning of restoration under Cyrus the Great of Persia (2 Chronicles 10 to 36). The focus of this chapter is the reign of Hezekiah, king of Judah.

== Text ==
This chapter was originally written in the Hebrew language and is divided into 21 verses.

=== Textual witnesses ===
Some early manuscripts containing the text of this chapter in Hebrew are of the Masoretic Text tradition, which includes the Codex Leningradensis (1008). (Note: Since 1947 the current text of Aleppo Codex is missing 2 Chronicles 26:19–35:7.)

There is also a translation into Koine Greek known as the Septuagint, made in the last few centuries BCE. Extant ancient manuscripts of the Septuagint version include Codex Vaticanus (B; $\mathfrak{G}$^{B}; 4th century), and Codex Alexandrinus (A; $\mathfrak{G}$^{A}; 5th century). (Note: The whole book of 2 Chronicles is missing from the extant Codex Sinaiticus.)

== The reform of Hezekiah (31:1–10) ==
Verse 1 parallels to 2 Kings 18:4 summarizing Hezekiah's reforming measures. Once the temple service was reinstalled, Hezekiah reinstated the priestly and Levitical divisions as set out by David (1 Chronicles 23–26; 1 Chronicles 28:13, 21) and implemented by Solomon (cf. 2 Chronicles 8:14; 23:18–19), then Hezekiah organized the tithes. The king also contributed to the support of the Temple and its workers, like David did (1 Chronicles 22:14–16; 29:2–5), and likewise responded by the people with their generosity (cf. 1 Chronicles 29:6–9). The chief priest in Hezekiah's time was Azariah, which has the same name of the chief priest under Solomon, both from the lineage of Zadok, portraying Hezekiah in similar light to David and Solomon although their names were not explicitly mentioned in this chapter.

=== Verse 7 ===
In the third month they began to lay the foundation of the heaps, and finished them in the seventh month.

- "The third month" (Sivan; usually May–June) is the month of the grain harvest and at the same time the month of the harvest festival (called "Shavuot", "Feast of weeks", "Feast of Harvest", "Feast of Firstfruits" or "Pentecost"), which fell about the sixth day of the month when the tithe in kind would be paid.
- "The seventh month" (Tishrei; usually September to October): is the period of vine and fruit harvesting and the celebration of the Feast of Ingathering ("Sukkot" or "Feast of Tabernacles").

== Hezekiah organizes the priests (31:11–21) ==
The abundance of tithes needed to be stored so king Hezekiah ordered to build or renovate more chambers for the purpose. Two Levites (Cononiah and Shimei) administered "the offerings and the tithes and the dedicated things", with the assistance of ten 'overseers' (Jehiel, Azaziah, Nahath, Asahel, Jerimoth, Jozabad, Eliel, Ismachiah, Mahath, and Benaiah), leading to the 'round sum of twelve' (verses 11–13). Verses 14–19 detail the distribution of the offerings as the financial support for the priests and Levites on the basis of the number and size of the family (cf. 1 Chronicles 23:3), both in Jerusalem and in the other cities. Verses 20–21 parallel to 2 Kings 18:5–7 in the assessment of Hezekiah's reign, praising Hezekiah more than for any other king of Judah, describing him in a specific threefold praise: "good and right and faithful before the LORD".

=== Verse 19 ===
Also of the sons of Aaron the priests, which were in the fields of the suburbs of their cities, in every several city, the men that were expressed by name, to give portions to all the males among the priests, and to all that were reckoned by genealogies among the Levites.

- "The fields of the suburbs of their cities": see Leviticus 25:32–34; Numbers 35:2–5
- "Expressed by name": meaning that 'all priests and Levites of full age were sacredly remembered and similarly carefully provided'; see 1 Chronicles 12:31; 2 Chronicles 28:15

== See also ==
- Aaron
- Asherah pole
- Biblical Sabbath
- David
- First Fruits
- Jerusalem
- Jewish holidays
- Kohen
- Levites
- Moses
- New moon
- Tribe of Benjamin
- Tribe of Ephraim
- Tribe of Manasseh
- Solomon
- Zadok
- Related Bible parts: Leviticus 25, Numbers 35, 2 Kings 18, 2 Chronicles 29, 2 Chronicles 30

== Sources ==
- Ackroyd, Peter R (1993). "Chronicles, Books of". In Metzger, Bruce M; Coogan, Michael D (eds.). The Oxford Companion to the Bible. Oxford University Press. pp. 113–116. ISBN 978-0195046458.
- Bennett, William (2018). The Expositor's Bible: The Books of Chronicles. Litres. ISBN 978-5040825196.
- Coogan, Michael David (2007). Coogan, Michael David; Brettler, Marc Zvi; Newsom, Carol Ann; Perkins, Pheme (eds.). The New Oxford Annotated Bible with the Apocryphal/Deuterocanonical Books: New Revised Standard Version, Issue 48 (Augmented 3rd ed.). Oxford University Press. ISBN 9780195288810.
- Mabie, Frederick (2017). "I. The Chronicler's Genealogical Survey of All Israel". In Longman III, Tremper; Garland, David E (eds.). 1 and 2 Chronicles. The Expositor's Bible Commentary. Zondervan. pp. 267–308. ISBN 978-0310531814.
- Mathys, H. P. (2007). "14. 1 and 2 Chronicles". In Barton, John; Muddiman, John (eds.). The Oxford Bible Commentary (first (paperback) ed.). Oxford University Press. pp. 267–308. ISBN 978-0199277186.
- Würthwein, Ernst (1995). The Text of the Old Testament. Translated by Rhodes, Erroll F. Grand Rapids, MI: William B. Eerdmans. ISBN 0-8028-0788-7.
