= Sennacherib's Annals =

Records of the Assyrian king Sennacherib

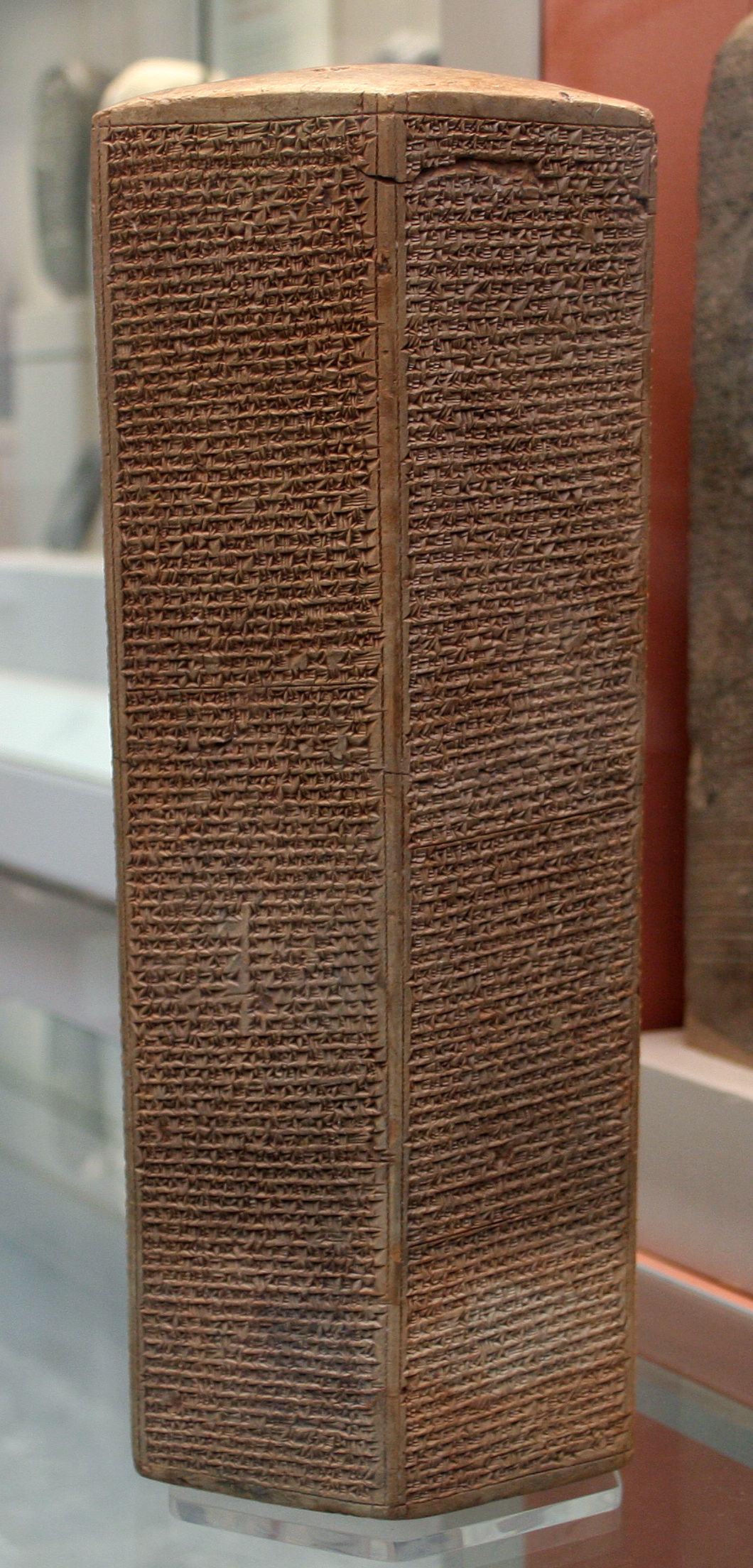
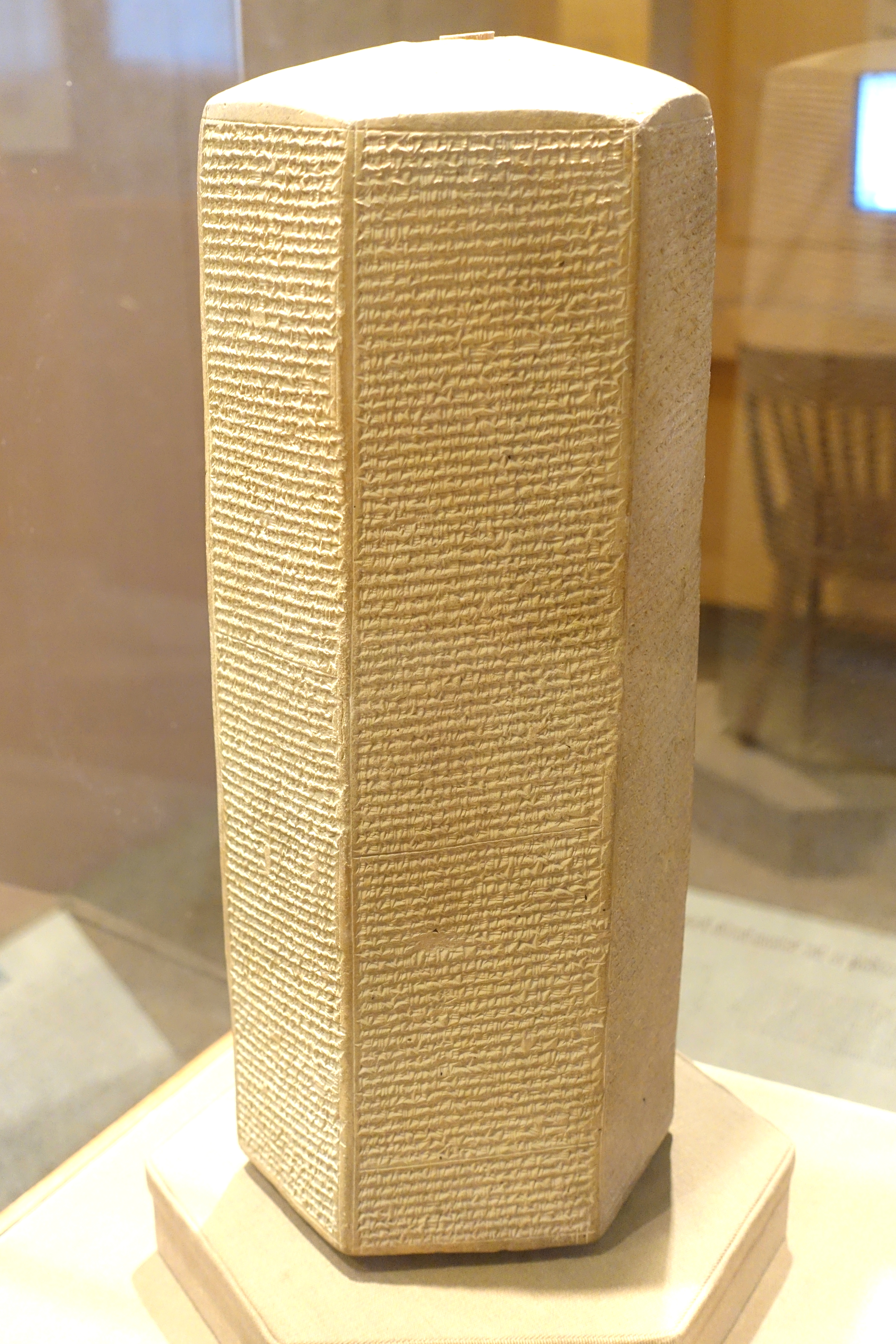
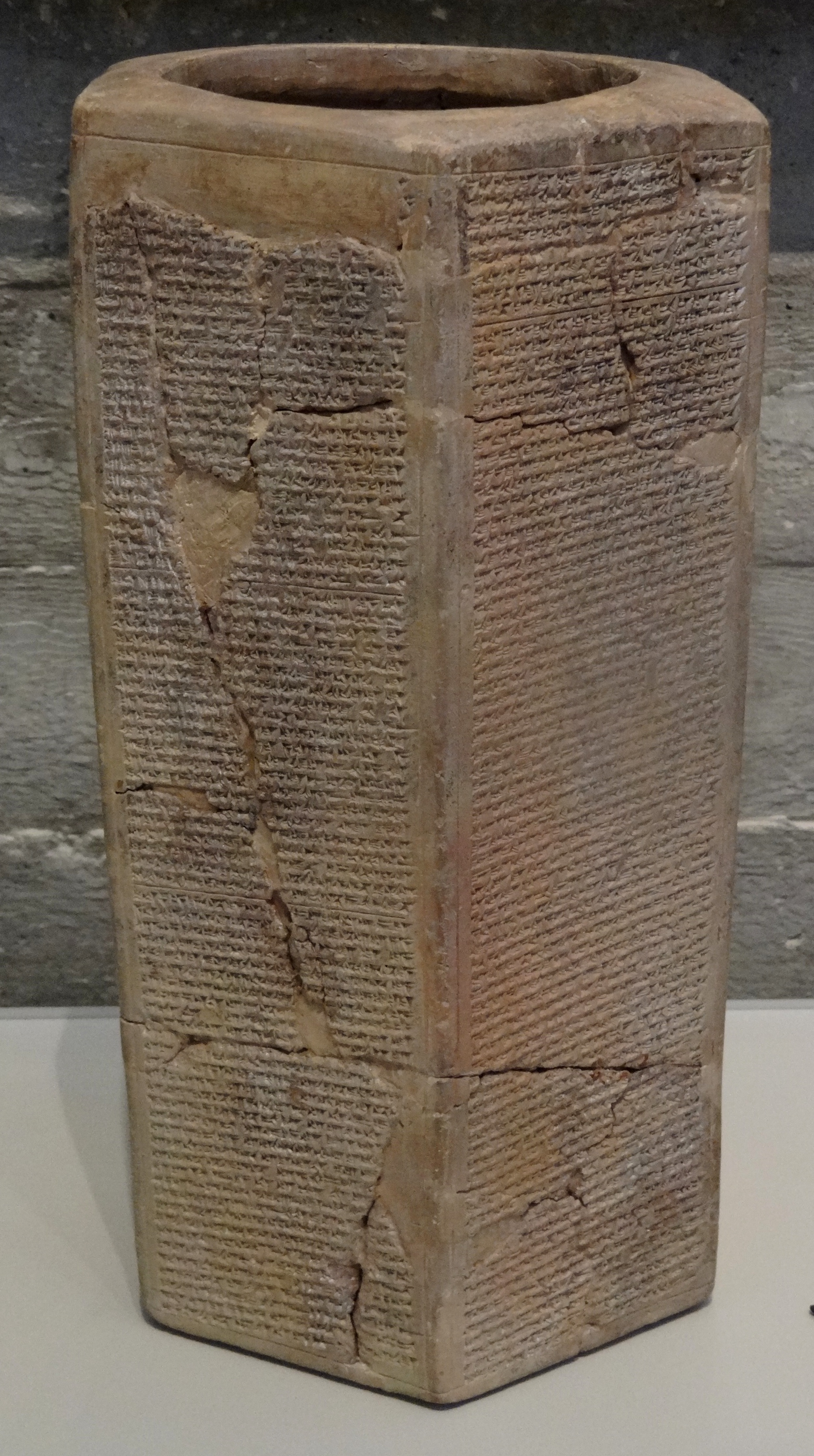
- Taylor Prism, London ISAC Prism, Chicago Jerusalem Prism, Israel Sennacherib's Annals of his military campaign (704–681 BC), including his invasion into the Kingdom of Judah
- Material: Clay
- Size: Varies
- Writing: Akkadian cuneiform
- Created: c. 690 BCE
- Discovered: From 1830
- Present location: Final editions in the British Museum, Institute for the Study of Ancient Cultures, and the Israel Museum

Sennacherib's Annals are the annals of Sennacherib, emperor of the Neo-Assyrian Empire. They are found inscribed on several artifacts, and the final versions were found in three clay prisms inscribed with the same text: the Taylor Prism is in the British Museum, the ISAC or Chicago Prism in the Institute for the Study of Ancient Cultures and the Jerusalem Prism is in the Israel Museum in Jerusalem.

The Taylor Prism is one of the earliest cuneiform artifacts analysed in modern Assyriology. It was found a few years before the modern deciphering of cuneiform.

The annals are notable for describing Sennacherib's siege of Jerusalem during the reign of king Hezekiah. This event is recorded in several books contained in the Bible including Isaiah 36 and 37; 2 Kings 18:17; and 2 Chronicles 32:9. The invasion is mentioned by Herodotus, who does not refer to the Kingdom of Judah and says the invasion ended at Pelusium on the edge of the Nile Delta.

== Description and discovery ==
The prisms contain six paragraphs of Akkadian, written in cuneiform. They are hexagonal, made of red baked clay, and stand 38.0 cm high by 14.0 cm wide. They were created during the reign of Sennacherib in 689 BC (Chicago) or 691 BC (London, Jerusalem).

The Taylor prism is thought to have been found by Colonel Robert Taylor (1790–1852) in 1830 at Nineveh, which was the ancient capital of the Neo-Assyrian Empire under Sennacherib, before its initial excavation by Botta and Layard more than a decade later. Although the prism remained in Ottoman Iraq until 1846, in 1835 a paper squeeze was made by the 25-year-old Henry Rawlinson, and a plaster cast was taken by Pierre-Victorien Lottin in c.1845. The original was later thought to have been lost, until it was purchased from Colonel Taylor's widow in 1855 by the British Museum. (Colonel Taylor may have been the father of John George Taylor, who, himself, became a noted Assyrian explorer and archaeologist.)

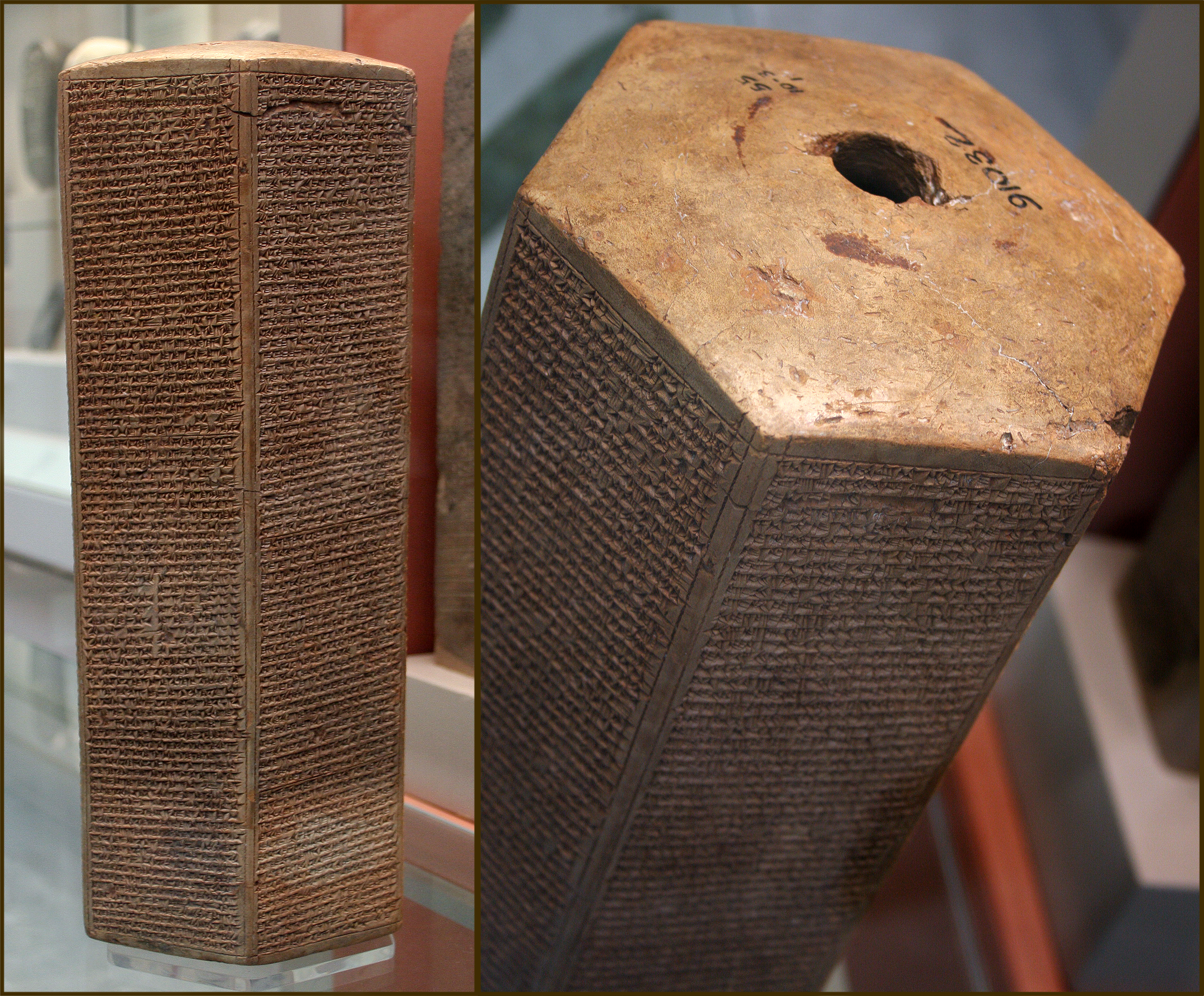
General view and detail of the Taylor prism, British Museum.

Another version of this text is found on what is known as the Sennacherib Prism, which is now in the ISAC. It was purchased by James Henry Breasted from a Baghdad antiques dealer in 1919 for the Institute. The Jerusalem prism was acquired by the Israel Museum at a Sotheby's auction in 1970. It was only published in 1990.

The three known complete examples of this inscription are nearly identical, with only minor variants, although the dates on the prisms show that they were written sixteen months apart (the Taylor and Jerusalem Prisms in 691 BC and the ISAC prism in 689 BC). At least eight other fragmentary prisms, all in the British Museum, preserve parts of this text, most of them containing just a few lines.

The Chicago text was translated by Daniel David Luckenbill and the Akkadian text, along with a translation into English, is available in his book The Annals of Sennacherib (University of Chicago Press, 1924).

== Significance ==
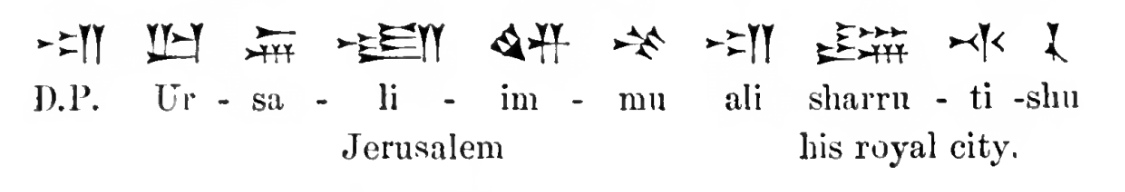
Jerusalem as inscribed on the prism

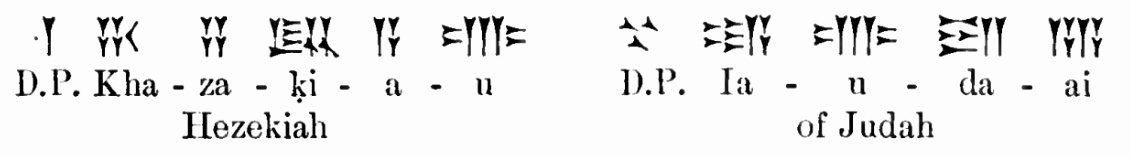
Hezekiah of Judah as inscribed on the prism

It is one of three accounts discovered so far which have been left by Sennacherib of his campaign against the Kingdom of Israel-Samaria and the Kingdom of Judah, giving a different perspective on these events from that of the Books of Kings in the Hebrew Bible.

Some passages in 2 Kings 18–19 agree with at least a few of the claims made on the prism. The Hebrew Bible recounts a successful Assyrian attack on Israel-Samaria, as a result of which the population was deported, and later recounts that an attack on Lachish was ended by Hezekiah suing for peace, with Sennacherib demanding 300 talents of silver and 30 talents of gold. Hezekiah gave him all the silver from his palace and from the Temple in Jerusalem and the gold from doors and doorposts of the Temple. Compared to this, the Taylor Prism proclaims that 46 walled cities and innumerable smaller settlements were conquered by the Assyrians, with 200,150 people, and livestock, being deported. The conquered territory was dispersed among the three kings of the Philistines instead of being given back. Additionally, the prism says that Sennacherib’s siege resulted in Hezekiah being shut up in Jerusalem "like a caged bird", Hezekiah's mercenaries and 'Arabs' deserting him, and Hezekiah eventually buying off Sennacherib, having to give him antimony, jewels, ivory-inlaid furniture, his own daughters, harem, and musicians. It states that Hezekiah became a tributary ruler.

As for the king of Judah, Hezekiah, who had not submitted to my authority, I besieged and captured forty-six of his fortified cities, along with many smaller towns, taken in battle with my battering rams. ... I took as plunder 200,150 people, both small and great, male and female, along with a great number of animals including horses, mules, donkeys, camels, oxen, and sheep. As for Hezekiah, I shut him up like a caged bird in his royal city of Jerusalem. I then constructed a series of fortresses around him, and I did not allow anyone to come out of the city gates. His towns which I captured I gave to Mitinti, king of Ashdod; Padi, ruler of Ekron; and Silli-bel, king of Gaza.

The tribute given by Hezekiah is then mentioned but in this account, nothing is said of Sennacherib capturing the city of Jerusalem.
