= Isaiah 39 =

Book of Isaiah, chapter 39

- ← chapter 38 chapter 40 →
- The Great Isaiah Scroll, the best preserved of the biblical scrolls found at Qumran from the second century BC, contains all the verses in this chapter.
- Book: Book of Isaiah
- Hebrew Bible part: Nevi'im
- Order in the Hebrew part: 5
- Category: Latter Prophets
- Christian Bible part: Old Testament
- Order in the Christian part: 23

Isaiah 39 is the thirty-ninth chapter of the Book of Isaiah in the Hebrew Bible or the Old Testament of the Christian Bible. This book contains the prophecies attributed to the prophet Isaiah, and is one of the Books of the Prophets. This chapter concludes the section of Isaiah attributed to Isaiah himself (Proto-Isaiah). In the New King James Version, this chapter is sub-titled "The Babylonian Envoys". Isaiah foretells the exile to Babylon of the people of Judah.

== Text ==
The original text was written in Hebrew language. This chapter is divided into 8 verses.

=== Textual witnesses ===
Some early manuscripts containing the text of this chapter in Hebrew are of the Masoretic Text tradition, which includes the Codex Cairensis (895), the Petersburg Codex of the Prophets (916), Aleppo Codex (10th century), Codex Leningradensis (1008).

Fragments containing parts of this chapter were found among the Dead Sea Scrolls (3rd century BC or later):

- 1QIsa^{a}: complete
- 1QIsa^{b}: complete
- 4QIsa^{b} (4Q56): complete

There is also a translation into Koine Greek known as the Septuagint, made in the last few centuries BCE. Extant ancient manuscripts of the Septuagint version include Codex Vaticanus (B; $\mathfrak{G}$^{B}; 4th century), Codex Sinaiticus (S; BHK: $\mathfrak{G}$^{S}; 4th century), Codex Alexandrinus (A; $\mathfrak{G}$^{A}; 5th century) and Codex Marchalianus (Q; $\mathfrak{G}$^{Q}; 6th century).

== Parashot ==
The parashah sections listed here are based on the Aleppo Codex. Isaiah 39 is a part of the Narrative (Isaiah 36–39). {P}: open parashah; {S}: closed parashah.

{S} 39:1-2 {S} 39:3-8 {P}

== Verse 1 ==
At that time Merodachbaladan, the son of Baladan, king of Babylon, sent letters and a present to Hezekiah: for he had heard that he had been sick, and was recovered.

The letters sent by Merodach-Baladan, also known as Marduk-apla-iddina II, are also mentioned in 2 Kings 20:12.

== See also ==
- Babylon
- Babylonian Chronicles
- Hezekiah
- Isaiah, son of Amoz
- Jerusalem
- Kingdom of Judah
- Merodach-baladan
- Related Bible parts: 2 Kings 19, 2 Kings 20, 2 Chronicles 32

== Bibliography ==
- Würthwein, Ernst (1995). The Text of the Old Testament. Translated by Rhodes, Erroll F. Grand Rapids, MI: Wm. B. Eerdmans. ISBN 0-8028-0788-7.
