= 2 Chronicles 30 =

Second Book of Chronicles, chapter 30

- ← chapter 29 chapter 31 →
- The complete Hebrew text of the Books of Chronicles (1st and 2nd Chronicles) in the Leningrad Codex (1008 CE).
- Book: Books of Chronicles
- Category: Ketuvim
- Christian Bible part: Old Testament
- Order in the Christian part: 14

2 Chronicles 30 is the thirtieth chapter of the Second Book of Chronicles the Old Testament in the Christian Bible or of the second part of the Books of Chronicles in the Hebrew Bible. The book is compiled from older sources by an unknown person or group, designated by modern scholars as "the Chronicler", and had the final shape established in late fifth or fourth century BCE. This chapter belongs to the section focusing on the kingdom of Judah until its destruction by the Babylonians under Nebuchadnezzar and the beginning of restoration under Cyrus the Great of Persia (2 Chronicles 10 to 36). The focus of this chapter is the reign of Hezekiah, king of Judah.

== Text ==
This chapter was originally written in the Hebrew language and is divided into 27 verses.

=== Textual witnesses ===
Some early manuscripts containing the text of this chapter in Hebrew are of the Masoretic Text tradition, which includes the Codex Leningradensis (1008). (Note: Since 1947 the current text of Aleppo Codex is missing 2 Chronicles 26:19–35:7.)

There is also a translation into Koine Greek known as the Septuagint, made in the last few centuries BCE. Extant ancient manuscripts of the Septuagint version include Codex Vaticanus (B; $\mathfrak{G}$^{B}; 4th century), and Codex Alexandrinus (A; $\mathfrak{G}$^{A}; 5th century). (Note: The whole book of 2 Chronicles is missing from the extant Codex Sinaiticus.)

== Hezekiah proclaims a Passover (30:1–12) ==
This section of the chapter records the preparations for the Passover feast. Hezekiah took all the significant measures to establish the Passover feast in the first year of his reign, because at that time the northern kingdom had already fallen, so Hezekiah had to quickly make a final attempt to restore the unity of the YHWH worship in all area of the former united kingdom of Israel. In line with the Chronicler's 'democratic convictions', the king, the princes and the people made a collective decision to celebrate Passover (verses 1–7), and to have a good preparation for such a feast (verse 3), they made a decision to delay it until the second month, which had happened before (Numbers 9:6–13). Following this decision Hezekiah sent messengers to all parts the country and particularly to the northern kingdom, reciting a message (using a play on words): "return to YHWH, he will return to you". The demise of the northern kingdom (unreported in the Chronicles) may have caused various reactions to the invitation: most (remaining) inhabitants of the northern kingdom reacted with 'derision and scorn', although some accepted by 'humbling themselves', whereas in the sovereign southern kingdom the Judeans reacted with 'one heart' (verse 12), which is attributed by the Chronicler to stem from God's actions (cf. 1 Chronicles 29).

=== Verse 1 ===
And Hezekiah sent to all Israel and Judah, and wrote letters also to Ephraim and Manasseh, that they should come to the house of the Lord at Jerusalem, to keep the passover unto the Lord God of Israel.

- "Sent to all Israel and Judah": that is, sent "messengers" or "runners".
- "Wrote letters also to Ephraim and Manasseh": the two chief tribes of the northern kingdom, representing the northern ten tribes, to emphasize that Hezekiah invited all Israel and Judah (cf. verse 5).

== Hezekiah celebrates the Passover (30:13–27) ==
This section reports the celebration of Passover and contains the first description of a complete pilgrimage in the Hebrew Bible. Once the temple was cleansed (chapter 29), Jerusalem was also liberated from all foreign influence, so only legitimate worship for YHWH took place. The national celebration of the Passover recalls the 'heady days of the United Monarchy'. Many participants (especially from the northern tribes of Ephraim, Manasseh, Issachar and Zebulun), the officials, the priests and the Levites had not properly cleansed themselves, but they were trying hard to show their change of heart, and that is what seems most important, so Hezekiah called upon YHWH to pardon those people and YHWH granted the petition (verse 20). According to the law, any person making the sacrifice should be responsible for its slaughter, but since many of them had not been cleansed properly, the Levites assumed this role (verse 16). The important character of the feast (typical in the Chronicles) is the voluntary action with a great sense of unity (involving priests, Levites, and laymen), joy, and generosity prevalent amongst the king and the notables, and many animals are sacrificed. The Chronicler notes that such scenes had not happened since the days of Solomon, referring not just to the celebration alone, but also to an impression of possible reunification since the kingdom fell apart after Solomon's death.

=== Verse 21 ===
And the children of Israel that were present at Jerusalem kept the feast of unleavened bread seven days with great gladness: and the Levites and the priests praised the LORD day by day, singing with loud instruments unto the LORD.

- "With loud instruments unto the Lord" or "with instruments of strength to Jehovah" to accompany the psalms of praise, which glorify the strength of the God of Israel, such as Psalm 29:1: "Ascribe unto Jehovah, ye sons of God, ascribe unto Jehovah glory and strength."

== See also ==
- Aaron
- Beersheba
- Dan
- David
- Jeduthun
- Jerusalem
- Kidron Valley
- Kohen
- Levites
- Moses
- Passover
- Tribe of Asher
- Tribe of Ephraim
- Tribe of Issachar
- Tribe of Manasseh
- Tribe of Zebulun
- Solomon
- Related Bible parts: Exodus 12, Leviticus 17, Numbers 9, 2 Kings 18, 2 Chronicles 28, 2 Chronicles 29

== Sources ==
- Ackroyd, Peter R (1993). "Chronicles, Books of". In Metzger, Bruce M; Coogan, Michael D (eds.). The Oxford Companion to the Bible. Oxford University Press. pp. 113–116. ISBN 978-0195046458.
- Bennett, William (2018). The Expositor's Bible: The Books of Chronicles. Litres. ISBN 978-5040825196.
- Coogan, Michael David (2007). Coogan, Michael David; Brettler, Marc Zvi; Newsom, Carol Ann; Perkins, Pheme (eds.). The New Oxford Annotated Bible with the Apocryphal/Deuterocanonical Books: New Revised Standard Version, Issue 48 (Augmented 3rd ed.). Oxford University Press. ISBN 9780195288810.
- Mabie, Frederick (2017). "I. The Chronicler's Genealogical Survey of All Israel". In Longman III, Tremper; Garland, David E (eds.). 1 and 2 Chronicles. The Expositor's Bible Commentary. Zondervan. pp. 267–308. ISBN 978-0310531814.
- Mathys, H. P. (2007). "14. 1 and 2 Chronicles". In Barton, John; Muddiman, John (eds.). The Oxford Bible Commentary (first (paperback) ed.). Oxford University Press. pp. 267–308. ISBN 978-0199277186.
- Würthwein, Ernst (1995). The Text of the Old Testament. Translated by Rhodes, Erroll F. Grand Rapids, MI: William B. Eerdmans. ISBN 0-8028-0788-7.
