= 2 Chronicles 29 =

Second Book of Chronicles, chapter 29

- ← chapter 28 chapter 30 →
- The complete Hebrew text of the Books of Chronicles (1st and 2nd Chronicles) in the Leningrad Codex (1008 CE).
- Book: Books of Chronicles
- Category: Ketuvim
- Christian Bible part: Old Testament
- Order in the Christian part: 14

2 Chronicles 29 is the twenty-ninth chapter of the Second Book of Chronicles the Old Testament in the Christian Bible or of the second part of the Books of Chronicles in the Hebrew Bible. The book is compiled from older sources by an unknown person or group, designated by modern scholars as "the Chronicler", and had the final shape established in late fifth or fourth century BCE. This chapter belongs to the section focusing on the kingdom of Judah until its destruction by the Babylonians under Nebuchadnezzar and the beginning of restoration under Cyrus the Great of Persia (2 Chronicles 10 to 36). The focus of this chapter is the reign of Hezekiah, king of Judah.

== Text ==
This chapter was originally written in the Hebrew language and is divided into 36 verses.

=== Textual witnesses ===
Some early manuscripts containing the text of this chapter in Hebrew are of the Masoretic Text tradition, which includes the Codex Leningradensis (1008). (Note: Since 1947 the current text of Aleppo Codex is missing 2 Chronicles 26:19–35:7.) Fragments containing parts of this chapter were found among the Dead Sea Scrolls, that is, 4Q118 (4QChr; 50–25 BCE) with extant verses 1–3.

There is also a translation into Koine Greek known as the Septuagint, made in the last few centuries BCE. Extant ancient manuscripts of the Septuagint version include Codex Vaticanus (B; $\mathfrak{G}$^{B}; 4th century), and Codex Alexandrinus (A; $\mathfrak{G}$^{A}; 5th century). (Note: The whole book of 2 Chronicles is missing from the extant Codex Sinaiticus.)

=== Old Testament references ===
- 2 Chronicles 29:1–19: 2 Kings 18:1–12

== Hezekiah, king of Judah (29:1–19) ==
Among the kings of Judah (after David and Solomon), the Chronicles record more extensively about Hezekiah (2 Chronicles 29–32), focusing his reform and restoration of the Temple and worship. Verses 1–19 parallel to 2 Kings 18:1–12 with the addition of material of temple cleansing. In the first month of his (sole) reign, Hezekiah opened and repaired the doors of the temple (verse 3), which was shut by this father (2 Chronicles 28:24), but because the main building was still unclean, Hezekiah held the meeting with the priests and Levites at the square on the east of the temple (verse 4). Hezekiah's speech (verses 5, 11) encouraged the Levites (and priests) to resume their traditional tasks, recalling the sins of the ancestors and their effects (verses 6–10). Verses 12–19 report the cleansing of the temple, involving two sons each of seven Levite families (the number "seven" is a keyword in this chapter, cf. e.g. verses 17, 21), the last three of them (Asaph, Heman, and Jeduthun) are the families of singers ascribed to the Levites (cf. 1 Chronicles 15:5–8 about the first three names). w. 15–17, having After sanctified themselves, the priests removed unholy things from the temple then the Levites carried them from the forecourt into the Kidron valley (verses 15–17). The sanctification of the temple was completed on the sixteenth day of the first month, forcing a delay in the Passover feast (which should fall on the fifteenth day of the first month). The report to Hezekiah explicitly mentioned Ahaz who removed the temple utensils from Solomon's temple, which in post-exilic times were continued to be used in the second temple, after being returned by the Persians to those who resettled Jerusalem.

=== Verse 1 ===
Hezekiah began to reign when he was twenty-five years old, and he reigned twenty-nine years in Jerusalem. His mother's name was Abijah the daughter of Zechariah.

- Cross references: 2 Kings 18:2
- "Reigned 29 years": according to Thiele's chronology, Hezekiah became the sole king after his father died before 1 Nisan (April) 715 BCE, until his death between September 687 and September 686 BCE, for the total of 29 years. Prior to that, Hezekiah became co-regent with his father from September 729 BCE to sometime before 1 Nisan (April) 715 BCE.
- "Abijah": written as "Abi" in the parallel verse 2 Kings 18:2.

== Hezekiah restores Temple worship (29:20–36) ==
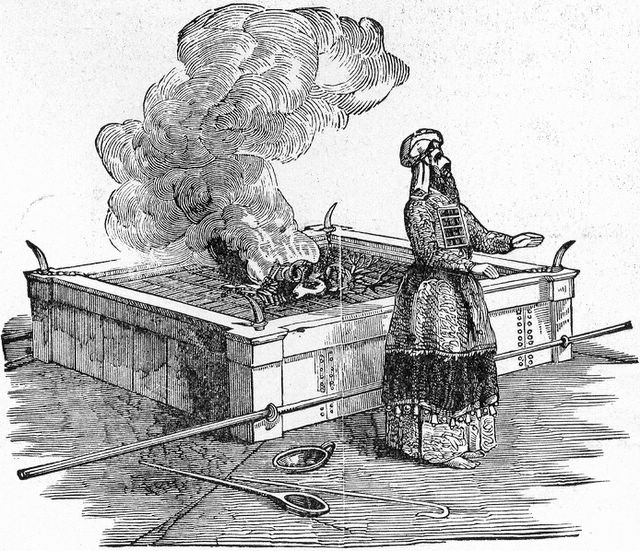
Illustration of a High Priest offers the sacrifice of a goat

The feast after the consecration of the temple here was without parallel in the Hebrew Bible, a mixture of rituals in the book of Leviticus and Numbers for sanctifying altars (Numbers 7:88), consisting of three parts: preparations, sacrifices made by the princes and the sacrifices made by the people, which were given voluntarily and joyfully. It also reflects the consecration of the second temple (Ezra 6:17; 8:35; cf. Ezekiel 43–45). The people's voluntary offerings here are not mentioned elsewhere in the Chronicles.

=== Verse 22 ===
So they killed the bulls, and the priests received the blood and sprinkled it on the altar. Likewise they killed the rams and sprinkled the blood on the altar. They also killed the lambs and sprinkled the blood on the altar.

- Cross references: Leviticus 17:6; Numbers 18:17
- "Received the blood": that is, "caught the blood in bowls of sprinkling" (Numbers 8:14).
- "Sprinkled the blood": this action marks the expiation (Leviticus 4:7, 18, 30; Leviticus 5:9; Leviticus 8:14, 15; Hebrews 9:12-14, 19–22).

== See also ==
- Aaron
- Ahaz
- Asaph
- David
- Heman
- Gad
- Jeduthun
- Jerusalem
- Kidron Valley
- Kohen
- Levites
- Nathan
- Solomon's Temple
- Related Bible parts: Leviticus 4, Leviticus 17, Numbers 18, 2 Kings 18, 2 Chronicles 28

== Sources ==
- Ackroyd, Peter R (1993). "Chronicles, Books of". In Metzger, Bruce M; Coogan, Michael D (eds.). The Oxford Companion to the Bible. Oxford University Press. pp. 113–116. ISBN 978-0195046458.
- Bennett, William (2018). The Expositor's Bible: The Books of Chronicles. Litres. ISBN 978-5040825196.
- Coogan, Michael David (2007). Coogan, Michael David; Brettler, Marc Zvi; Newsom, Carol Ann; Perkins, Pheme (eds.). The New Oxford Annotated Bible with the Apocryphal/Deuterocanonical Books: New Revised Standard Version, Issue 48 (Augmented 3rd ed.). Oxford University Press. ISBN 9780195288810.
- Fitzmyer, Joseph A. (2008). A Guide to the Dead Sea Scrolls and Related Literature. Grand Rapids, MI: William B. Eerdmans Publishing Company. ISBN 9780802862419.
- Mabie, Frederick (2017). "I. The Chronicler's Genealogical Survey of All Israel". In Longman III, Tremper; Garland, David E (eds.). 1 and 2 Chronicles. The Expositor's Bible Commentary. Zondervan. pp. 267–308. ISBN 978-0310531814.
- Mathys, H. P. (2007). "14. 1 and 2 Chronicles". In Barton, John; Muddiman, John (eds.). The Oxford Bible Commentary (first (paperback) ed.). Oxford University Press. pp. 267–308. ISBN 978-0199277186.
- McFall, Leslie (1991), "Translation Guide to the Chronological Data in Kings and Chronicles" (PDF), Bibliotheca Sacra, 148: 3–45, archived from the original (PDF) on 2010-08-27
- Thiele, Edwin R. (1983). The Mysterious Numbers of the Hebrew Kings (3rd ed.). Grand Rapids, Michigan: Zondervan. ISBN 978-0-310-36010-0.
- Ulrich, Eugene, ed. (2010). The Biblical Qumran Scrolls: Transcriptions and Textual Variants. Brill.
- Würthwein, Ernst (1995). The Text of the Old Testament. Translated by Rhodes, Erroll F. Grand Rapids, MI: William B. Eerdmans. ISBN 0-8028-0788-7.
