= Khirbet Mudayna (Wadi ath-Thamad) =

Iron Age ruin in central Jordan

Khirbet Mudayna on Wadi ath-Thamad
- Mudayna Thamad, Khirbet el-Medeineh eth-Themed
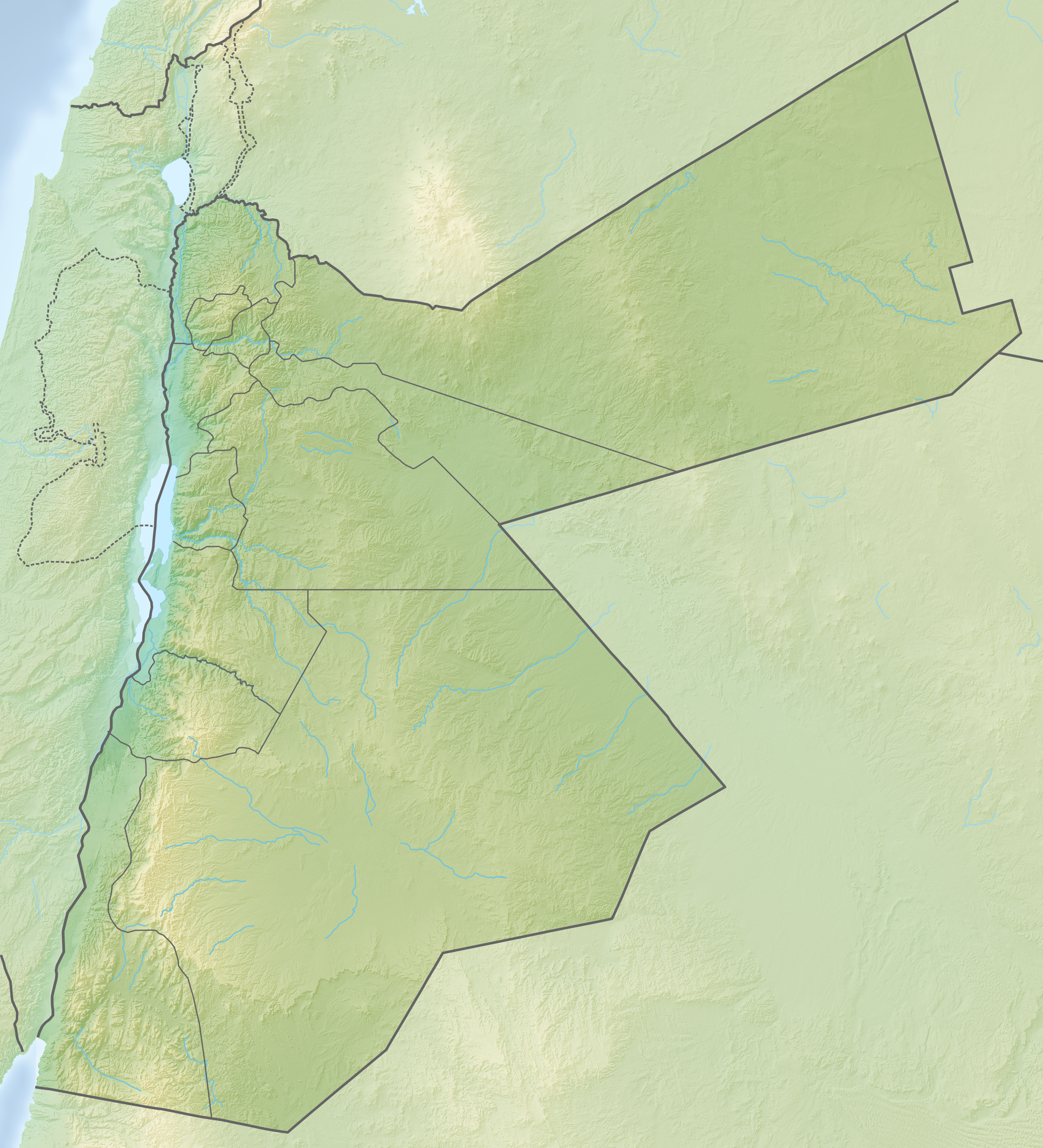
- Location within Jordan
- 31°35′19.2″N 35°54′28″E
- Type: fortified settlement, sanctuary
- Periods: Iron Age II (main settlement); Nabataean and early Roman periods (renewed presence)
- Cultures: Moabite, Nabataean
- Associated with: Moabites, Israelites (according to Finkelstein and Lipschits), Nabateans
- Location: Amman Governorate, Jordan
- Region: Dhiban Plateau
- Part of: Moab, Nabataean kingdom
- Palestine grid: 223/110

History
- Built: 9th century BC
- Abandoned: 7th/6th century BC

Site notes
- Excavation dates: 1995–2012
- Archaeologists: P. M. Michèle Daviau, Robert Chadwick, Margreet Steiner
- Condition: In ruins

Khirbet Mudayna, often distinguished as Khirbet Mudayna on the Wadi ath-Thamad, or simply Mudayna Thamad / Kh. Medeiyneh (eth-Themed) etc., is an archaeological site in central Jordan, located southeast of Madaba and northeast of Dhiban. The settlement occupies an oval hill on the southern bank of the Wadi ath-Thamad and dates primarily to Iron Age II, when it formed a fortified town within the kingdom of Moab.

Excavations carried out between 1995 and 2012 uncovered substantial defensive works, including a broad casemate wall and a six-chambered gate. Among the principal discoveries are a Late Iron II sanctuary, installations used in textile and metalworking industries, and a range of imported and locally manufactured objects. A collapsed tomb containing human remains was also identified near the ruin. The settlement was destroyed in the 7th or 6th century BC and subsequently abandoned for an extended period; occupation at the site resumed only in the Nabataean and Early Roman periods.

== Geography ==
The site occupies the southern bank of the Wadi ath-Thamad, the eastern extension of Wadi Heidan before it drains southward into Wadi Mujib (the ancient Arnon River). It is located 20 km southeast of Madaba.

== Site name; identification ==
The site is the northernmost of six settlements in modern Jordan that share the name "Mudayna", which means "small city" in Arabic. According to archaeologist Chaim Ben David, the name may actually preserve the biblical toponym "Midian," which Late Roman and Byzantine sources place in Moab near the Arnon River.

The ancient name of the settlement is unknown. Several scholars, including Yohanan Aharoni, J. Andrew Dearman, Israel Finkelstein and Oded Lipschits have proposed identifying the site with the biblical town of Jahaz/Jahzah (Hebrew: יהץ).

== Research history ==
The site was first documented in the early 20th century by several explorers, among them Brünnow, Domaszewski (1904), and Musil (1907). Nelson Glueck visited the mound in the 1930s, and compared it to Maiden Castle, an Iron Age hillfort in England.

Systematic works began in 1995 with the launch of the Wadi ath-Thamad Project, which opened with a surface survey. Excavations continued for more than fourteen seasons, concluding in 2012, under the direction of P. M. Michèle Daviau, with Robert Chadwick as co-director and Margreet Steiner as field director.

== Fortifications and gate ==
The site was enclosed by a 5 m thick casemate wall system, constructed of unhewn limestone boulders in a boulder-and-chink style. Similar wall construction is known from other sites in ancient Moab, as well as from Iron Age settlements in the neighboring kingdoms of Israel, Judah, and Ammon. Excavations suggest that the rectangular form of the mound is largely artificial, created through extensive filling and leveling against the casemate wall to produce an elevated podium. The casemate wall was reinforced by an earthen glacis, necessary to counter the pressure of the fills deposited behind it.

The most prominent architectural feature is a monumental six-chambered gate measuring 15.8 × 16.4 meters. Although smaller in scale, this gate follows a design also found at several sites in Israel and Judah (notably Megiddo, Hazor, Lachish and Gezer). The gate included two flanking bastions and a square tower, positioned on the northeastern tip of the tell. The complex was composed of six rooms opening onto a central roadway, which was 4 meters wide and covered by a permanent roof. Radiocarbon analysis of wooden beams from the gate dates its construction to roughly 810–755 BC.

The gate suffered a severe conflagration, evidenced by calcined wall stones, fallen ceiling material and charred wooden beams, identified as olive, carob and mulberry. The presence of over 30 iron and copper-alloy projectile points confirms the structure was destroyed in an armed attack. Typological analysis of the copper-alloy arrowheads provided strong evidence that the city was attacked by a Neo-Babylonian army sometime during the first quarter of the sixth century BCE, perhaps in the twenty-third year of Nebuchadnezzar’s reign (582/581 BCE) in line with the account preserved by Josephus.

Finkelstein and Lipschits argue, on the basis of the fortification system and architectural layout, that Khirbet Mudayna reflects an Omride-period design and should be viewed as a state-sponsored fortress established by the Kingdom of Israel in the 9th century BC. In their reconstruction, the site later came under Moabite control following the rebellion of King Mesha, who records in his inscription that Jahaz (identified by them with this site) was taken without destruction, in contrast to Ataroth. The archaeological record similarly shows no evidence of a 9th-century destruction, with occupation continuing until the early 6th century BC, when the site was abandoned amid the Babylonian expansion into Moab.

== Sanctuary ==
Among the structures uncovered at the site is the so-called "Building 149," identified as a local sanctuary or small shrine. The structure consists of a main room with an annex, and its interior walls are lined with benches. Its remains point to cultic activity: alongside six lamps and broken ceramic figurines, three limestone altars were found, broken around a large flat podium stone. One of them features painted horizontal lines and red and black triangles, alongside a sump with a drain hole, which was used for libations. A second, smaller altar has a central depression stained with soot, indicating its use for burnt offerings. The third altar preserves a Moabite inscription identifying it as an "incense altar"; according to the text, as interpreted by the site's excavators, it was made by "Elshama" for "ysp, the daughter of ’wt." Anson Rainey proposed an alternative interpretation of the inscription, arguing that it was of Israelite or Phoenician origin and that the final element refers not to a person but to a cultic structure, meaning "the house of ’wt." He further suggested that the object may have reached the site during the period when Moab was under the rule of the Israelite king Omri or his son and successor, Ahab.

Also discovered was a gaming board, which was possibly used for divination.

The specific deity or deities worshipped in this shrine remain unknown. The scarcity of portable cultic vessels and complete pottery suggests that the sanctuary was emptied before the town's destruction. Finds in the annex, including iron-smithing slag and a mortar bowl, indicate that the space may have been repurposed for weapon repair during the final assault on the settlement.

== Other findings ==
Among the most notable discoveries were the first inscribed scale weights ever found in Moab, including one engraved with a numeral in abnormal hieratic and another written in a West Semitic alphabetic script, likely Aramaic, reading "thirty" (šlšn, as in Moabite and Aramaic, which rules out Hebrew and Phoenician). Together, these features resemble the weight system used in the neighboring Kingdom of Judah. Seven stamp seals and three bullae, many decorated with dot patterns interpreted as astral symbols, show that goods were exchanged as part of a regional commerce network. A large pillared industrial building contained limestone basins, loom weights, a basalt quern, and metalworking debris, indicating that several crafts were practiced there.

== See also ==
- Khirbat Ataruz
- Mesha Stele
- Transjordan (region), the highlands east of the River Jordan

== Bibliography ==
- Ben David, Chaim (2017). "The Mudayna sites of the Arnon tributaries: "Midian alongside Moab"?" (PDF). Antiguo Oriente. 15: 149–174.
- Chadwick, Robert; Daviau, P. M. Michèle; Steiner, Margreet L.; Judd, Margaret A. (2024). The Iron Age Town of Mudayna Thamad, Jordan: Excavations of the Fortifications and Northern Sector (1995–2012). BAR International Series. Oxford: BAR Publishing. ISBN 9781407361963.
- Daviau, P. M. Michele (1997). "Moab's Northern Border: Khirbat al-Mudayna on the Wadi ath-Thamad". The Biblical Archaeologist. 60 (4): 222–228.
- Daviau, P. M. Michèle; Steiner, Margreet (2000). "A Moabite Sanctuary at Khirbat al-Mudayna". Bulletin of the American Schools of Oriental Research. 320 (1): 1–21.
- Daviau, P. M. Michèle; Dion, Paul-Eugène (2002). "Economy-Related Finds from Khirbat al-Mudayna (Wadi ath-Thamad, Jordan)". Bulletin of the American Schools of Oriental Research. 328 (1): 31–48.
- Dugaw, Sean; Lipschits, Oded; Daviau, P. M. Michèle (2026). "Copper-Alloy Projectile Points at Mudayna Thamad". In Adams, Matthew J.; Gadot, Yuval; Uziel, Joe; Zelinger, Yehiel (eds.). From Artifact to History: Studies in the Hellenistic and Roman World and Beyond in Honor of Andrea Berlin. Lockwood Press. pp. 79–85. ISBN 978-1-957454-52-8.
- Finkelstein, Israel; Lipschits, Oded (2010). "Omride Architecture in Moab: Jahaz and Ataroth". Zeitschrift des Deutschen Palästina-Vereins. 126 (1): 29–42.
- Rainey, Anson F. (2002). "The New Inscription from Khirbet el-Mudeiyineh". Israel Exploration Journal. 52: 81–86.
