= Ataroth =

Three Israelite cities mentioned in the Hebrew Bible

Ataroth (עטרות ‘Ǎṭārōṯ) is the name of two or three Iron Age cities mentioned in the Hebrew Bible and the Mesha Stele.

== Etymology ==
Atarot(h) may mean "crowns" or "cattle pens" in Hebrew.

== Mesha Stele ==
The Mesha Stele from about 840 BC was erected commemorating Mesha's victory over the "son" of Omri, but he fails to say which one. He states that he massacred all the Israelites at Ataroth as satisfaction for the blood lust of Chemosh and Moab. He adds that he captured Nebo (Ataroth) and killed everybody, 7,000 men, boys, women, girls, and maidens, because he had dedicated it to the goddess Ashtar-Chemosh.

== Hebrew Bible and identification ==
In the Hebrew Bible, the name Ataroth refers to two or perhaps three towns:

1. A town east of the Jordan in Gilead, mentioned in Numbers, 32:3 & 32:34, in the territory of the Tribe of Gad. Ataroth lay within the tribal allotment of Reuben, but was built up by the Gadites during the period of Israelite conquest. This is very probably Khirbat Ataruz, north of Wadi Heidan. The Mesha Stele (Moabite Stone) is likely referring to this town.
2. A town west of the Jordan, mentioned in Joshua, 16:2, which describes the southern border of the children of Joseph (the tribes of Ephraim and Manasseh). This southern border of Joseph would also be the southern border of Ephraim within Joseph, and also be the northern border of Benjamin. This Ataroth may be the same as Ataroth-Addar, mentioned in Joshua, 18:13, in a description of the border of Benjamin. A possible location is 'Atara, south of al-Bireh in the West Bank. Another is Khirbet ed-Darieh near Lower Bethoron.
3. A town west of the Jordan, possibly the same as above, mentioned in Joshua, 16:7, which gives the borders of Ephraim within Joseph.
