= Hasan Awad =

Bedouin archaeologist

Hasan ʿAwad al-Qatshan (born 1912–13) was a Bedouin archaeologist associated with the Jordanian Department of Antiquities. Working with his partner Gerald Lankester Harding and other western archaeologists, he played a role in a number of major discoveries, including those of the Lachish letters and the Dead Sea Scrolls.

== Archaeological career ==
ʿAwad was born to the Negev Bedouin Hanajira of Beersheba. Though not formally educated in archaeology, he began his training as a teenager, on Flinders Petrie's excavations at Tell Jemmeh (1926–1927). He went on to acquire a reputation as a skilled excavator and the "best archaeological foreman in Jordan", working with James Leslie Starkey at Tell ed-Duweir (Lachish, 1932–1939), George Ernest Wright at Tell Balata (Shechem, 1956–1973), the American Schools of Oriental Research at Dhiban (1950–1953), Henri de Contenson at Tell esh-Shuna (1953), and Diana Kirkbride at Petra (1955–1956). Harding credited ʿAwad with the discovery of the Lachish letters, and he was the first archaeologist to recognise the importance of the El-Kerak Inscription, which he bought from a Bedouin in Tafilah.

ʿAwad's most frequent collaborator was Gerald Lankester Harding, who he first met at Tell Jemmeh. They were partners for nearly twenty years and lived together in Amman, where Harding was the director of the Department of Antiquities. ʿAwad conducted an excavated a number of sites in Jordan on Harding's behalf, including the Iron Age tombs at Sahab. In 1952, Harding heard that local Bedouin had found a new cave at Qumran Caves, the site of the discovery the Dead Sea Scrolls. ʿAwad joined Harding's expedition to the caves along with Dominique Barthélemy, Józef Milik, Henri de Contenson, Roland de Vaux, Azmi Khalil, and Ibrahim Assula, and was responsible for supervising the party's Bedouin labourers. John M. Allegro recounted Hasan's role in one episode during the exploration of the caves:

On another occasion, in the Third Cave, investigation disclosed a great crack in the rock at the back of the cave going down into the depths of the mountain. The Bedouin said that one of their number had already explored it, but to be sure, the foreman of Harding’s party, one Hasan Awad, probably the best archaeological foreman in Jordan, volunteered to go down into the crevice on a rope himself. The opening was only two and a half feet wide, and some way down was an even narrower chimney through which he could barely squeeze. Altogether he dropped some fifty feet before landing on a sandy floor, which bore traces of the earlier visit by the Bedouin but nothing of archaeological value. The haul up was a nightmare for all concerned, as, having no pulleys, the party at the surface had to haul Hasan up, inch by inch, trusting that the rope would not break or be cut by a sharp projection of rock. The half an hour that it took to bring him to the surface seemed like half a day, and the bravery displayed by this man cannot be accounted too highly.
