= Kamas-halta =

Kamas-halta (Moabite: 𐤊𐤌𐤔𐤏𐤔𐤄, romanized: Kamōš-ʿaśa; Neo-Assyrian Akkadian: 𒅗𒈠𒊍𒄬𒋫𒀀, romanized: Kamas-ḫaltā) is mentioned in Assyrian sources as a king of Moab during the reign of Assurbanipal, who was king of the Neo-Assyrian Empire between 669–631 BCE.

== Sources ==
- Beyer, Klaus [in German] (2011). "The Languages of Transjordan". In Gzella, Holger (ed.). Languages from the World of the Bible. Berlin, Germany: Walter de Gruyter. pp. 111–127. doi:10.1515/9781934078631.111. ISBN 978-1-934-07863-1.
- Knauf, Ernst Axel [in German]; Maani, Sultan (1987). "On the Phonemes of Fringe Canaanite: The Case of Zerah-Uḏruḥ and 'Kamâšḫaltâ". Ugarit-Forschungen. 19.
- Lipiński, Edward (2006). On the Skirts of Canaan in the Iron Age: Historical and Topographical Researches. Orientalia Lovaniensia analecta. Vol. 153. Leuven, Belgium: Peeters Publishers. ISBN 978-9-042-91798-9.
- Weippert, Manfred [in German] (1997). "Moab". In Edzard, Dietz Otto; Calmeyer, P.; Postgate, J. N.; Röllig, W. [in German]; von Soden, W.; Stol, M.; Wilhelm, G.; Frantz-Szabó, Gabriella (eds.). Reallexikon der Assyriologie und vorderasiatischen Archäologie (in German). Vol. 8. Berlin, Germany; New York City, United States: Walter de Gruyter. pp. 318–325. ISBN 978-3-110-14809-1.
