= Khirbat Ataruz =

Archaeological site in Jordan

- خربة عطروز (Arabic)
- Location within Jordan
- 31°34′27.92″N 35°39′53.11″E
- Location: Madaba Governorate, Jordan
- Region: Perea

Khirbat Ataruz (Arabic: خربة عطروز) or Ataroth (Hebrew: עטרות) is an archaeological site in Madaba Governorate, Jordan. The site was settled during the Iron Age, Hellenistic, Roman and Islamic periods, with most findings dating from the Iron Age.

A Moabite temple dated to mid-9th to early 8th century BCE found at the site is linked to the narrative of the Mesha Stele and the story of the conquest of Ataroth from the Israelites. The site is the location of one of the best preserved Iron Age temples in the Southern Levant (Jordan, Israel and the Palestinian territories).

== Geography ==
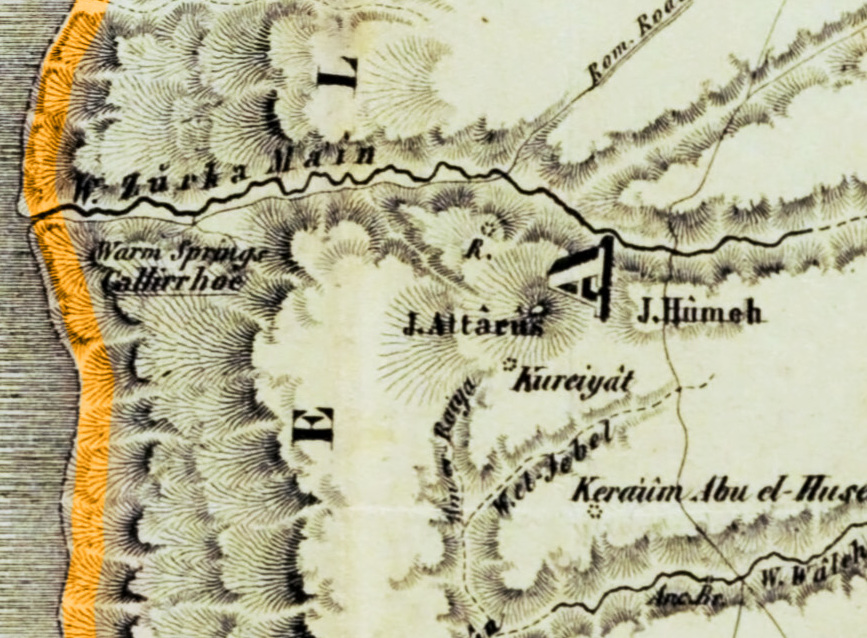
Jebel Attarus in the Heinrich Kiepert 1841 map of Palestine.

Khirbat Ataruz is located in the Dhiban Plateau, situated on the ridge of Jabal Hamidah, between the rivers of Zarqa Main and Sayl al-Hidan, about 10 kilometers from the town of Libb and 3 kilometers from the Hellenistic and Roman era ruins in Machaerus.

== Settlement periods ==
Settlement periods
Stratum	Archaeological period	Time frame
12	Iron I	1200–1000 BCE
11	Iron IIA (Early)	1000–900 BCE
10	Iron IIA (Early)	1000–900 BCE
9	Iron IIA (Early–Mid)	1000–900 BCE
8	Iron IIA (Early–Mid)	1000–900 BCE
7	Iron IIA–Iron IIB	C. 900 BCE
6	Iron IIB	900–700 BCE
Abandoned	Iron IIC–Persian–Early Hellenistic	700–167 BCE
5	Late Hellenistic	167–37 BCE
4	Late Hellenistic–Early Roman	C. 37 BCE
Abandoned	Roman–Byzantine period	132–638 CE
3	Early Islamic period	638–850 CE
2	Middle Islamic period	850–1500 CE
1	Middle Islamic period	850–1500 CE

The site has 12 layers of human settlement, each representing a distinct time in the history of the site. The main period of settlement is the Iron Age. The site was abandoned throughout the Persian period and resettled in the late Hellenistic period and through the early Roman period. In later Roman and Byzantine periods the site was abandoned again and resettled in the Early and Middle Islamic periods.

== Iron Age ==
During the Iron Age, the site was an important residential and cultic center. Apart from agriculture, the site also harbored industries such as metal, weaving, and textile production.

=== Archaeological evidence ===
It is evident in the excavation that the earliest settlement was built and maintained by a national or regional entity that was violently destroyed. It existed for one century or less, lasting from the late Iron I period to the early Iron IIA period. After the destruction around the late 10th century to early 9th century BCE, a large temple was built at the highest place of the site, which lasted for a short period and had changes to its outline made during the early-mid 9th century BCE. The temple was destroyed, but the site was resettled and lasted for a long period of time between the late Iron IIA and the Iron IIB, with the ruins of the temple still being used for cultic activities. Remains of agricultural structures were found, such as aqueducts, storage facilities and the kitchen remains. The site was abandoned after the Iron IIB period and no architectural remains attest to the Persian period.

=== Historical context ===
The site of Khirbat Ataruz is identified with the Iron Age settlement known as Ataroth, which appears both in the Book of Numbers of the Hebrew Bible and the Mesha Stele found in the nearby site of Dibon. The biblical source refers to Ataroth as one of the settlements established by the Tribe of Gad, along with Aroer and Dibon. It is also mentioned in relation to Heshbon and Mount Nebo, which are also found in central Transjordan.

The Mesha Stele was commissioned by Mesha, the king of Moab, who rebelled against the rule of the Kingdom of Israel under the House of Omri. According to the Books of Kings, Mesha was a vassal king who paid tribute to Israel in the shape of livestock and wool. The stele describes this relationship as oppressive. After the death of Omri, his son Ahab (whose name is not mentioned in the stele) continued to oppress Moab. Mesha rebelled against Israel probably during the reign of Jehoram (ruled c. 850 – c. 840 BCE), who was occupied with a war against Aram-Damascus under the rule of Hazael in the north. He captured Ataroth and killed its inhabitants as offering to his god Chemosh. Later he settled the town with the Sharonites and Maharatites (two unknown groups).

== Later periods ==
The site was resettled during the Hellenistic period as a rural village that relied on agricultural economy based on crops, wine and oil. Parts of the Iron Age temple were reused for cultic purposes and other parts were reused for residential purposes. It lasted until the Early Roman period and was abandoned throughout the Late Roman and Byzantine periods. The site was resettled again during the Early and Middle Islamic periods, when it was a thriving and populous medium-sized village that reused most of the walls from the previous settlement, and especially the temple ruins.

== See also ==
- Khirbet Mudayna (Wadi ath-Thamad)

== Bibliography ==
- Ji, Chang-Ho (2011). "Khirbet 'Ataruz: An Interim Overview of the 10 years of archaeological architectural Findings". Annual of the Department of Antiquities of Jordan. 55: 561–579.
- Ji, Chang-Ho (2012), "The early Iron Age II temple at Hirbet ‘Atarus and its architecture and selected cultic objects". In J. Kamlah (Ed.), Temple building and temple cult: Architecture and cultic paraphernalia of temples in the Levant (2.-1. mill. B.C.E.) (pp. 203–222). Wiesbaden: Harrassowitz Verlag, in the website of Ataruz Project
- Ji, Chang-Ho; Bates, Robert D. (2014). "Khirbat 'Ataruz 2011-2012: A preliminary report". Andrews University Seminary Studies. 52 (1): 47–91.
- Ji, Chang-Ho (2018). "A Moabite sanctuary at Khirbat Ataruz, Jordan: stratigraphy, findings, and archaeological implications". Levant: The Journal of the Council for British Research in the Levant. 50 (2): 173–210. doi:10.1080/00758914.2019.1620010. S2CID 198747033.
- Ji, Chang-Ho; Bates, Robert D.; Hawkins, Ralph K. (2020). "Khirbat 'Ataruz 2015: A Preliminary Report". Andrews University Seminary Studies. 58 (1): 85–104.
