= Kammusu-nadbi =

King of Moab

Kammusu-nadbi or Chemosh-nadab (Moabite: 𐤊𐤌𐤔𐤍𐤃𐤁, romanized: Kamōš-nadab or Kamōš-nadbī; Neo-Assyrian Akkadian: 𒄰𒈬𒋢𒈾𒀜𒁉, romanized: Kammusu-nâdbi) was the king of Moab during the reign of Sennacherib. He is described on Sennacherib's Prism as bringing tribute to the Assyrian king during the latter's Levantine campaigns.

== Sources ==
- Beyer, Klaus [in German] (2011). "The Languages of Transjordan". In Gzella, Holger (ed.). Languages from the World of the Bible. Berlin, Germany: Walter de Gruyter. pp. 111–127. doi:10.1515/9781934078631.111. ISBN 978-1-934-07863-1.
- Lipiński, Edward (2006). On the Skirts of Canaan in the Iron Age: Historical and Topographical Researches. Orientalia Lovaniensia analecta. Vol. 153. Leuven, Belgium: Peeters Publishers. ISBN 978-9-042-91798-9.
- Sanmartín, Joaquín (1988). "Silabografías y segmentalidad fonológica: trasvestigos gráficos en los silabarios antiguos" [Syllabographies and phonological segmentation: disguised graphics in ancient syllabaries] (PDF). Aula Orientalis (in Spanish). 6 (1): 83–98.
- Weippert, Manfred [in German] (2010). "Mesa von Moab im Kampf mit Israel und Juda (9. Jahrhundert)" [Mesha of Moab in War Against Israel and Judah (9th century)]. Historisches Textbuch zum Alten Testament [Historican Textbook of the Old Testament]. Göttingen, Germany: Vandenhoeck & Ruprecht. pp. 242–248. ISBN 978-3-647-51693-6.
