= Nebo (biblical town) =

Two towns mentioned in the Hebrew Bible

Nebo (Hebrew: נבו Nəḇō; also Nabo, Nebai, Nobai) is a town name mentioned in several passages of the Hebrew Bible (or Old Testament of Christianity). It is used for two towns, one in the territory assigned in the Bible to the Tribe of Reuben, and another in that of the Tribe of Judah.

The Reubenite Nebo is mentioned in Numbers 32:3, and is mentioned between Sibmah and Beon, the latter being an abbreviation of Baal-meon. In the same chapter, verse 38, it is again mentioned between Kiriathaim and Baal-meon, and it is found associated with the same names on the Mesha Stele (line 14). These and other indications show that the town was situated in the vicinity of Mount Nebo; its exact location is identified with Khirbet al-Mukhayyat. It belonged to the rich pasture lands which the tribes of Reuben and Gad asked of Moses in the distribution of the territory (Numbers 32). The town had reverted to the Moabites at the time when Isaiah prophesied against it (Isaiah 15:2; cf. Jeremiah 48:1, 22). The Mesha Stele (lines 14–18) boasts of having taken it from the Israelites. According to Saint Jerome, the sanctuary of the idol Chemosh was in Nebo.

== See also ==
- Isaiah 15
