= Baal-meon =

Israelite town mentioned in the Hebrew Bible

A biblical name, Baal-meon (Hebrew: בַּעַל מְעוֹן, lit. ''lord (ba'al) of dwelling''), was the name of a town of Reuben, that some have identified as modern-day Ma'in in Jordan. It was allegedly the birthplace of the prophet Elisha.

Ba'al Meon is mentioned in the Stele of Mesha, a 9th-century king of Moab, who claimed to have seized it. A place with the same name is also referenced in the Samaria Ostraca, suggesting the possibility that the town was later reclaimed by the Israelites.

The town is referenced in Jeremiah's prophecy concerning Moab, indicating he knew it as a Moabite town (Jeremiah 48:23).
