= Mesha =

9th-century BC king of Moab

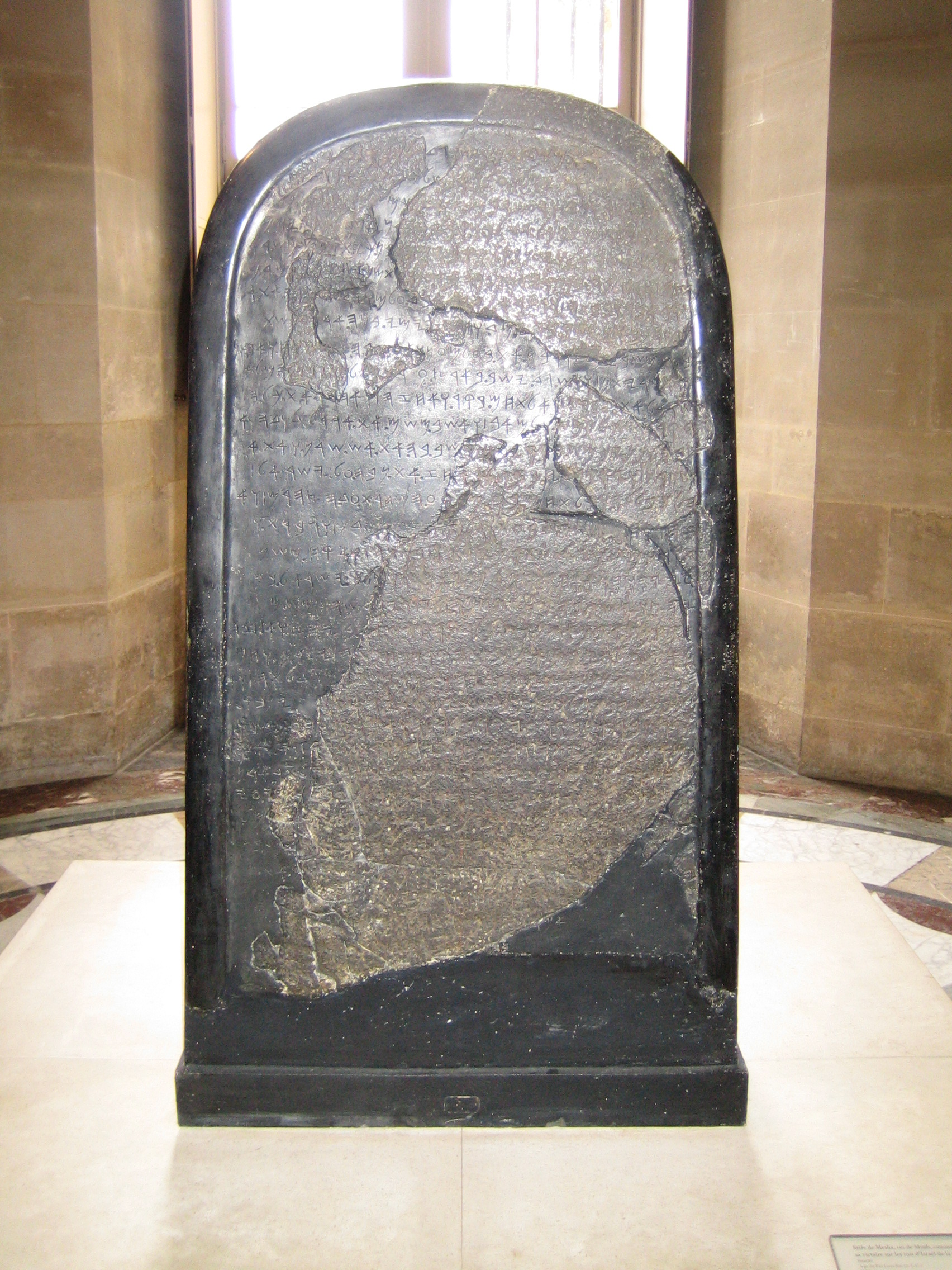
- Mesha Stele in the Louvre Museum
- Reign: fl. 9th Century BC
- House: Moabites
- Father: Chemosh-yat

King Mesha (Moabite: 𐤌𐤔𐤏, vocalized as: Mōšáʿ; Hebrew: מֵישַׁע Mēšaʿ) was a king of Moab in the 9th century BC, known most famously for having the Mesha Stele inscribed and erected at Dibon, Jordan. In this inscription he calls himself "Mesha, son of Kemosh-[...], the king of Moab, the Dibonite."

== The two main records: Mesha Stele and the Bible ==
The two main sources for the existence and history of King Mesha are the Mesha Stele and the Hebrew Bible.

Per the Mesha Stele, Mesha's father was also a king of Moab. His name is not totally preserved in the inscription, only the theophoric first element Chemosh(-...) surviving; throughout the years scholars have proposed numerous reconstructions, including Chemosh-gad, Chemosh-melek, and Chemosh-yat(ti), the latter of which has found some acceptance, as a Moabite king named Chemosh-yat is known from the Kerak Inscription.

In the Books of Samuel account, Moab is said to have been conquered by David (traditional floruit c. 1000-970 BC) and retained in the territories of his son Solomon (d. c. 931 BC). Later, after the split of Israel into two kingdoms, King Omri of the northern kingdom of Israel, reconquered Moab after it had been lost subsequent to King Solomon's reign.

The Mesha Stele, named after the Moabite king who erected it, makes no mention of earlier history and only mentions the conquest of the land by Omri. The stele records Mesha's liberation of Moab from under the suzerainty of Israel in c. 850 BC. The liberation is stated directly in the Hebrew Bible in 2 Kings 3:5, which reads: "But it came to pass, when Ahab was dead, that the king of Moab rebelled against the king of Israel."

2 Kings 3:4 reports the same events from the point of view of the Israelites, stating that "King Mesha of Moab ... used to deliver to the king of Israel one hundred thousand lambs, and the wool of one hundred thousand rams", before rebelling against "the king of Israel... Jehoram" (the Mesha Stele does not name the king against whom Mesha rebelled). The Second Book of Kings and the Mesha Stele differ in their explanation for the success of the revolt: according to Mesha, "Israel has been defeated", but 2 Kings says the Israelites withdrew when Mesha sacrificed the eldest son of either himself or the Edomite king to his god Chemosh (the text is not explicit at this point) on the walls of the capital city in which he was being besieged. If the latter is the case, the interpretation would be that Mesha's deed caused Edom to withdraw from the coalition. While it is plausible that one king held the eldest son of a neighbouring king hostage and sacrificed him when attacked, it is at least as plausible that he offered his own son to his main god in exchange for deliverance from destruction. Although the stele and the Bible do agree that the revolt occurred, the stele claims that Mesha won decisively, while the Bible conversely says that Israel did not suffer any losses. In any case, the effect stated in the Bible is noteworthy, "And there came great wrath against Israel. And they withdrew from him and returned to their own land." (2 Kings 3:27).

== See also ==
- List of biblical figures identified in extra-biblical sources
