= Kerak Inscription =

Iron Age inscription found in Jordan

El-Kerak Inscription
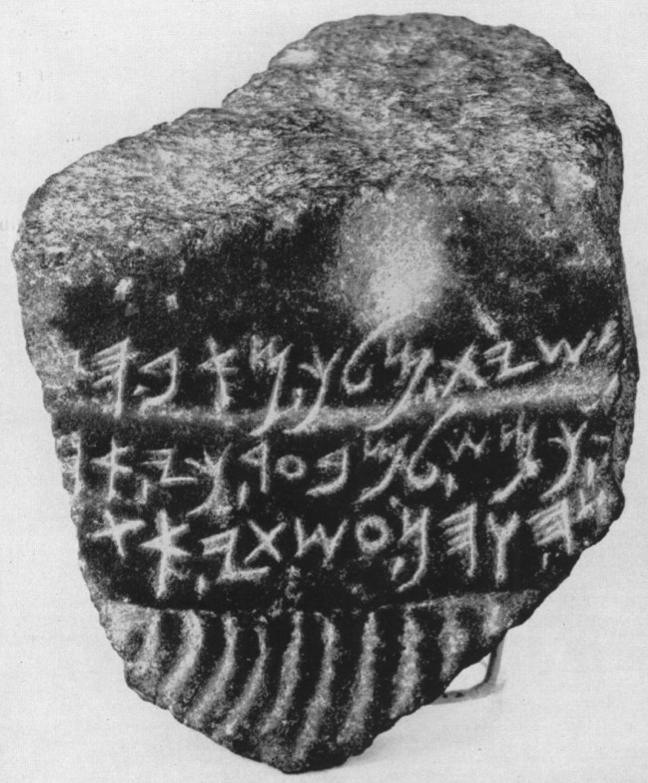
- Material: Basalt
- Height: 12.5 cm
- Width: 14 cm
- Created: c. 840 BC
- Discovered: 1958; Jordan
- Present location: Jordan Archaeological Museum
- Identification: 6807
- Language: Moabite

The Kerak Inscription, also known as the Kemoshyat inscription, was discovered in 1958 in Jordan, near Wadi el-Kerak. It is a basalt inscription fragment measuring 12.5 centimeters (4.9 in) high by 14 centimeters (5.5 in) wide. The inscription has been dated to the late ninth century BC. The inscription is known as KAI 306.

The fragment shows a belt, a pleated skirt, and a navel; along the mid-line of the fragment are three lines of Canaanite inscription.

The artifact is also known as the El-Kerak / Al-Karak / Karak Inscription.

== Discovery ==
The stone was acquired by the Jordan Archaeological Museum in 1958. It was reportedly found by Falah Qaddur (or Fallah el-Baddour), a bedouin from the Tafilah Governorate. According to Reed and Winnett, Qaddur stated that he had found the stone "in a foundation trench that had been cut for the construction of a new building in Al Karak." A letter from Awni Dajani, then the head of antiquities at the Jordan Archaeological Museum, stated that the stone was found by Odeh Subh el-Khwalideh (a relative of Qaddur) in the house of Suleiman el-Mubayyedin, near the Roman Pool east of Kerak.

== Inscription ==
The inscription contains 3 incomplete lines, comprising 8 complete words and fragments of 5 more, all written in the Moabite language known primarily from another artifact - the Mesha Stele. The text of the inscription looks like that of the Mesha Stele, but there is one special feature: the letter He has four horizontal strokes going to the left from the vertical stroke, while a typical He in tenth to fifth century BC northwest Semitic inscriptions contains only three strokes to the left. This letter is present in the inscription at least 3 times, and each time it appears with 4 horizontal strokes. Another difference between the Mesha Stele and the Kerak inscription is the separation between the words. In the Mesha Stele there are dots, and in the Kerak inscription there are small lines.

== Transliteration and translation ==
Provided below is a transcription of the inscription, its transliteration in Hebrew letters, as well as an English translation. Words in brackets are not preserved in the inscription, but reconstructed, partly by comparison with the Mesha Stele.

Line	Transcription	English translation
1	[אנכי (PN) בן כ]משית מלך מאב הד[יבני]	[I am (name), son of Che]mosh-yat, king of Moab the Dib[onite]...
2	[בבת]י כמש למבער כי אה[בני]	[... in the templ]e of Chemosh as a sacrifice, because I lo[ve...]
3	[...]נה והן עשתי את[...]	[... and beho]ld, I have made it...
