= Moab =

Ancient kingdom East of the Dead Sea

Coordinates: 31°30′06″N 35°46′36″E

Kingdom of Moab 𐤌𐤀𐤁
- c. 13th century BCE – c. 400 BCE
- A theoretical map of Canaan around 830 BCE. Moab is shown in purple on this map, between the Arnon and Zered rivers.
- Status: Monarchy
- Capital: Dibon
- Common languages: Moabite
- Religion: Canaanite religion
- History
  - Established: c. 13th century BCE
  - Collapsed: c. 400 BCE
- Today part of: Jordan

Moab (Note: Moabite: 𐤌𐤀𐤁 Māʾab; Biblical Hebrew: מוֹאָב Mōʾāḇ; Ancient Greek: Μωάβ Mōáb; Assyrian: 𒈬𒀪𒁀𒀀𒀀 Mu'abâ, 𒈠𒀪𒁀𒀀𒀀 Ma'bâ, 𒈠𒀪𒀊 Ma'ab; Egyptian: 𓈗𓇋𓃀𓅱𓈉 Mū'ībū) (/ˈmoʊæb/) was an ancient Levantine kingdom whose territory is today located in southern Jordan. The land is mountainous and lies alongside much of the eastern shore of the Dead Sea. The existence of the Kingdom of Moab is attested to by numerous archaeological findings, most notably the Mesha Stele, which describes the Moabite victory over an unnamed son of King Omri of Israel, an episode also noted in 2 Kings 3. The Moabite capital was Dibon. According to the Hebrew Bible, Moab was often in conflict with its Israelite neighbours to the west.

== Etymology ==
The etymology of the word Moab is uncertain. The earliest Biblical annotation is found in the Koine Greek Septuagint (Genesis 19:37), which describes the meaning of the name as ἐκ τοῦ πατρός μου ("from my father"), an obvious allusion to the account of Moab's parentage. Other etymologies which have been proposed regard it as a corruption of "seed of a father", or as a participial form from "to desire", thus connoting "the desirable (land)".

The medieval commentator Rashi maintained that the word Mo'ab means "from the father", since ab in Hebrew and Arabic and other Semitic languages means "father". He writes that as a result of the "immodesty" of Moab's name, God did not command the Israelites to refrain from inflicting pain upon the Moabites in the manner in which he did with regard to the Ammonites. Fritz Hommel regards Moab as an abbreviation of Immo-ab = "his mother is his father".

== Geography ==
Moab was situated in the Transjordan region, bordering by Edom to the south at the Wadi al-Ḥasa and Ammon to the north, though its exact border in the north is unclear and seems to have shifted during the kingdom's existence. While some biblical passages restrict its territory to the Karak Plateau between the Wadi al-Ḥasa and the Arnon River (today's Wadi Mujib), other biblical passages and the Mesha Inscription suggest the kingdom extended north of the Arnon. This northern frontier with Ammon was likely fluid during the Iron II period, leaving the status of border towns like Heshbon ambiguous.

== History ==
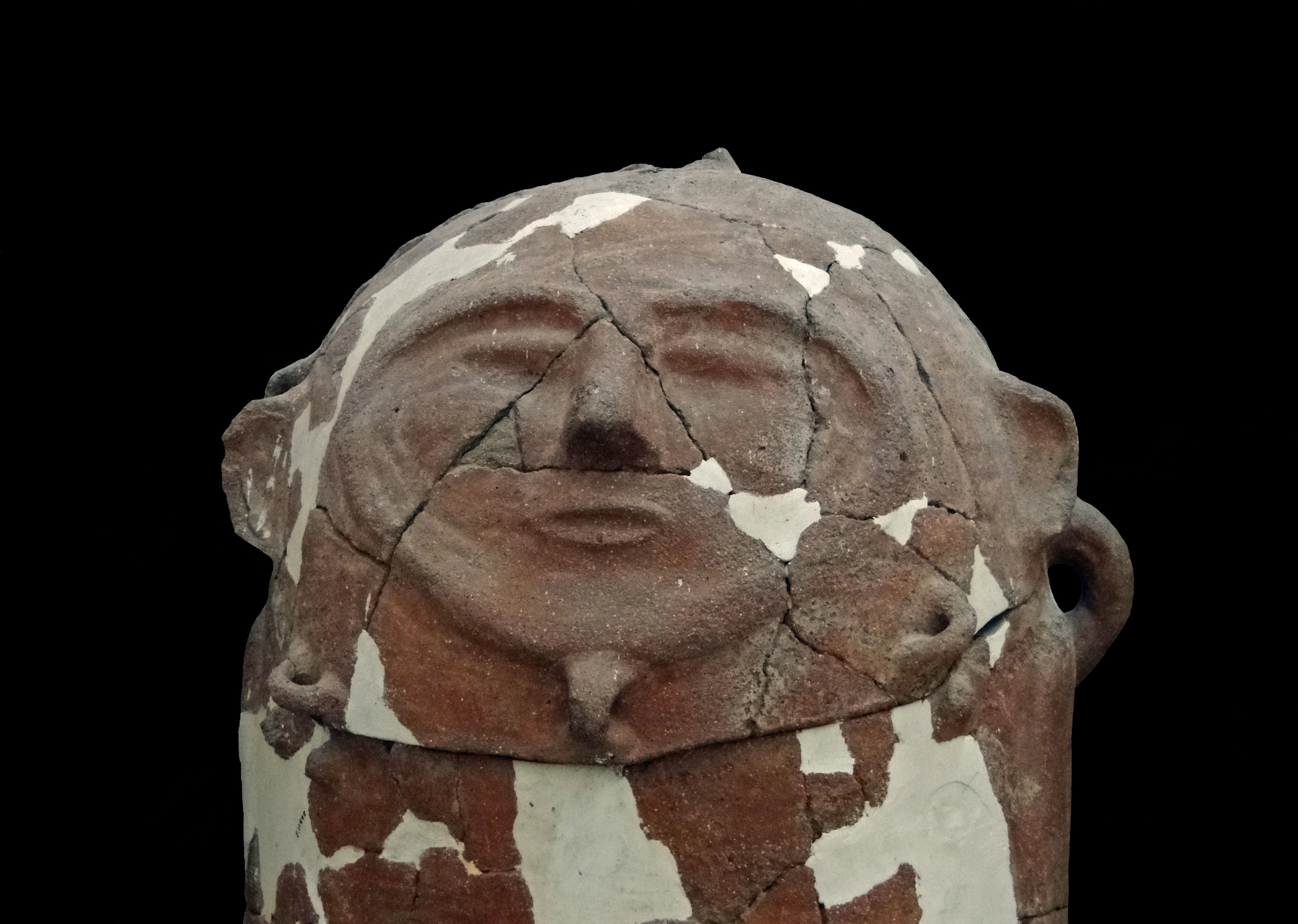
Moabite sarcophagus in Jordan Archaeological Museum in Amman

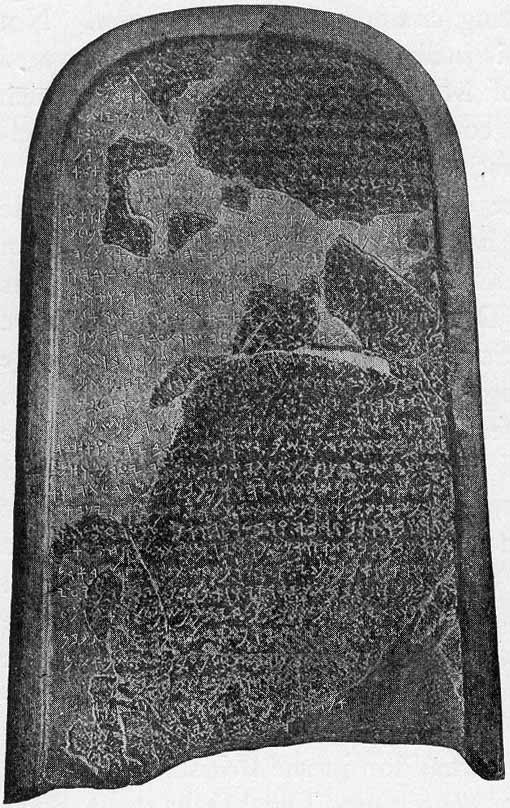
The Mesha stele describes King Mesha's wars against the Israelites

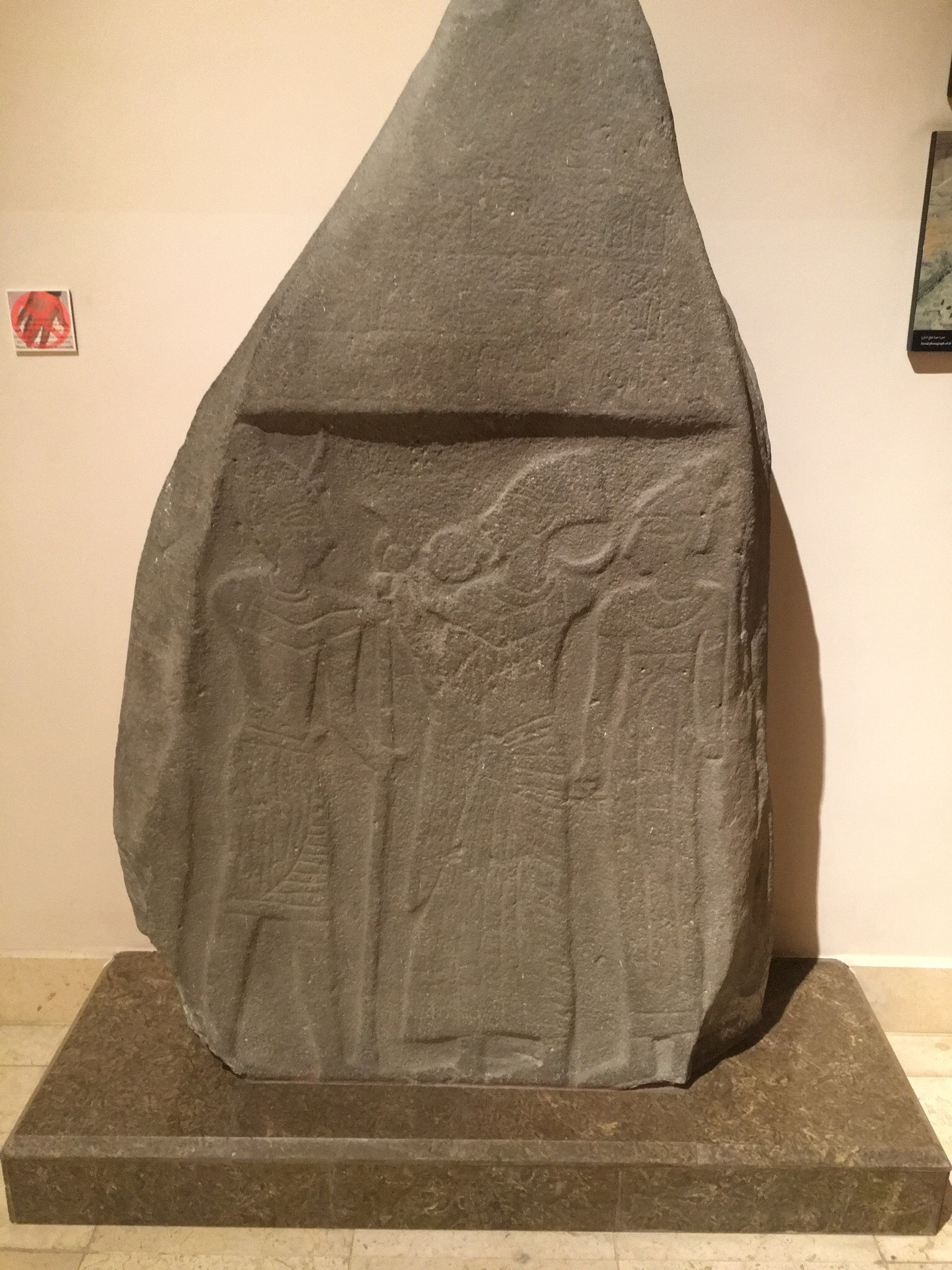
Al-Balu' Stele on display at the Jordan Museum.

=== Bronze Age ===
A colossal statue erected at Luxor by pharaoh Ramesses II in the 13th century BCE lists Mu'ab among a series of nations conquered during a campaign. The nucleus of the early Moabite state appears to have been located in several settlements between Wadi el-Wale and the Arnon River which originated in the Late Bronze Age.

Four inscriptions from the time of Ramesses II mention Mw-i-bw as a rebellious place that refuses to recognize Egypt's control over Canaan and, together with the Shasu of Mount Seir, conducted raids in Egypt. Pharaoh sent troops to the area and suppressed the rebellion - in the inscriptions of Ramesses II, the inhabitants are shown as having hairstyles identical to those of neighboring Canaanites (long hair collected and arranged) and not a braided hairstyle like the Shasu from later reliefs that contained the name Moab; a possible explanation is that Mw-i-bw, if it was indeed the land of Moab, was at that time inhabited by a pre-Moabite population, whereas the historical Moabites settled in the area only in the 12th century BCE. Na'aman argued, however, that the identification of Mw-i-bw with the biblical land of Moab can no longer be upheld; the former was more likely well to the north. Kenneth Kitchen later responded to Na'aman, reasserting the identification of Mw-i-bw with Moab.

=== Iron Age ===
The 9th century BCE Mesha Stele recounts that King Mesha built up an open sanctuary in Qeriho (cultic area of Dibon), conquered the Israelite territory north of Wadi el-Wale with the cities of Medeba, Ataroth and Nebo as well as Jahaz (east of Moab) and rebuilt the towns of Baal-meon, Kirjaton, Aroer, Beth-bamoth, Bezer, Medeba, Diblaton and his hometown Dibon.

An 8th-century BCE inscription seems to indicate that the Kingdom of Moab expanded into the eastern part of the Jordan Valley after a successful campaign against the Ammonites.

In the late 8th century BCE, the Neo-Assyrian Empire expanded into the southern Levant. While Assyria conquered the kingdoms of Israel and Aram-Damascus, converting their territories into provinces, other polities in the region maintained autonomy as vassal states. Moab followed this path of submission rather than annexation. Along with Judah, Ammon, Edom, and the Phoenician and Philistine city-states, it paid regular tribute to the Assyrian monarchs. In the Nimrud clay inscription of Tiglath-pileser III (r. 745–727 BCE), the Moabite king Salmanu (perhaps the Shalman who sacked Beth-arbel in Hosea 10:14) is mentioned as tributary to Assyria.

Records from Assyria's capital Nimrud (in upper Mesopotamia), mention Moabite emissaries receiving wine rations alongside dignitaries from Edom. There is also a mention of a Moabite emissary who was detained for entering the Assyrian heartland without permission. Assyrian officials also monitored Moabite internal security. A letter to Tiglath-Pileser III describes a raid on a Moabite city, likely carried out by nomads.

In 711 BCE, Moab entered into a regional coalition with Edom and Judah in rebellion against the Assyrian King Sargon II, which was instigated by Yamani of Ashdod. Moab managed to avoid the direct military retribution and subsequent devastation that the Assyrians inflicted upon Ashdod. Sargon II mentions this revolt against him by Moab, Philistia, Judah, and Edom on a clay prism known as Sargon II's Prism A. On the Taylor prism, which recounts the Assyrian expedition against Hezekiah of Judah, Kammusu-Nadbi (Chemosh-nadab), King of Moab, brings tribute to Sargon as his suzerain.

Musuri, King of Moab, also paid a tribute to Assarhaddon, at the same time as Manasseh of Judah, Qosgabar of Edom and other kings of the Levant. They sent building materials to Nineveh. Moab militarily supported Assurbanipal during his campaign against Egypt and the pharaoh Taharqa. The status of vassal of Assyria allowed Moab, in return, to benefit from the support of Assyria against the nomadic tribes of the Arabian desert, and in particular against the Qedarites. King Kamas-halta seemed to have defeated Ammuladi, king of Qedar.

=== Decline ===
According to Josephus, Moab was conquered by the Babylonians during twenty-third year of Nebuchadnezzar’s reign (582/581 BCE). This is supported by archaeological evidence from Khirbet Mudayna (Wadi ath-Thamad), a Moabite city likely destroyed by the Babylonians at this time. After the Roman conquest of the Levant by Pompey in 63 BCE, Moab lost its distinct identity through assimilation.

=== 19th-century travellers ===
Early modern travellers in the region included Ulrich Jasper Seetzen (1805), Johann Ludwig Burckhardt (1812), Charles Leonard Irby and James Mangles (1818), and Louis Félicien de Saulcy (1851).

== Biblical narratives ==
According to the biblical account, Moab and Ammon were born to Lot and Lot's elder and younger daughters, respectively, in the aftermath of the destruction of Sodom and Gomorrah. The Hebrew Bible refers to both the Moabites and Ammonites as Lot's sons, born of incest with his daughters (Genesis 19:37–38).

The Moabites first inhabited the rich highlands at the eastern side of the chasm of the Dead Sea, extending as far as the Arnon River to Wadi Hasa, from which country they expelled the Emim, the original inhabitants (Deuteronomy 2:11), but they themselves were afterward driven southward by warlike tribes of Amorites, who had crossed the river Jordan. These Amorites, described in the Bible as being ruled by King Sihon, confined the Moabites to the country south of the river Arnon, which formed their northern boundary (Numbers 21:13; Judges 11:18).

God renewed his covenant with the Israelites at Moab before the Israelites entered the Promised Land (Deuteronomy 29:1). Moses died there (Deut 34:5), prevented by God from entering the Promised Land. He was buried in an unknown location in Moab and the Israelites spent a period of thirty days there in mourning (Deuteronomy 34:6–8).

According to the Book of Judges, the Israelites did not pass through the land of the Moabites (Judges 11:18), but conquered Sihon's kingdom and his capital at Heshbon. After the conquest of Canaan the relations of Moab with Israel were of a mixed character, sometimes warlike and sometimes peaceable. With the tribe of Benjamin they had at least one severe struggle, in union with their kindred the Ammonites and the Amalekites (Judges 3:12–30). The Benjaminite shofet Ehud ben Gera assassinated the Moabite king Eglon and led an Israelite army against the Moabites at a ford of the Jordan river, killing many of them.

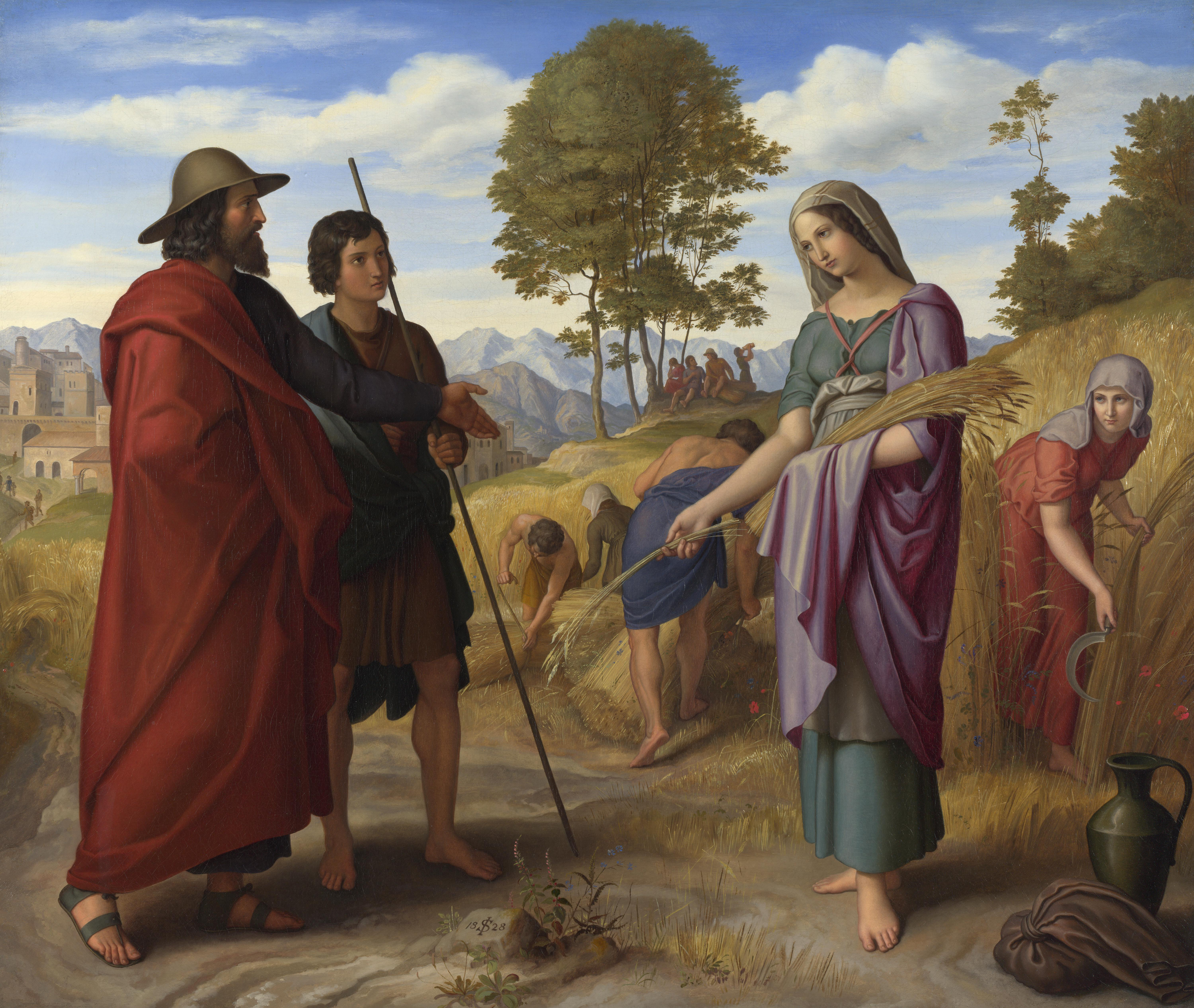
Ruth in the fields of Boaz by Julius Schnorr von Carolsfeld

The Book of Ruth testifies to friendly relations between Moab and Bethlehem, one of the towns of the tribe of Judah. By his descent from Ruth, David may be said to have been part Moabite. He committed his parents to the protection of the king of Moab (who may have been his kinsman), when hard pressed by King Saul. (1 Samuel 22:3,4) But here all friendly relations stop forever. The next time the name is mentioned is in the account of David's war, who made the Moabites tributary (2 Samuel 8:2; 1 Chronicles 18:2). Moab may have been under the rule of an Israelite governor during this period; among the exiles who returned to Judea from Babylonia were a clan descended from Pahath-Moab, whose name means "ruler of Moab". The Moabite Ruth is regarded as a prototype of a convert to Judaism.

At the disruption of the kingdom under the reign of Rehoboam, Moab seems to have been absorbed into the northern realm. It continued in vassalage to the Kingdom of Israel until the death of Ahab which according to Edwin Richard Thiele's reckoning was in about 853 BCE, when the Moabites refused to pay tribute and asserted their independence, making war upon the kingdom of Judah (2 Chronicles 22:1).

After the death of Ahab in about 853 BCE, the Moabites under Mesha rebelled against Jehoram, who allied himself with Jehoshaphat, King of the Kingdom of Judah, and with the King of Edom. According to the Bible, the prophet Elisha directed the Israelites to dig a series of ditches between themselves and the enemy, and during the night these channels were miraculously filled with water which appeared red as blood in the morning light.

According to the biblical account, the crimson color deceived the Moabites into thinking that the Israelites, and their allies, had attacked one another. Eager to acquire plunder, they were ambushed and defeated by the Israelites (2 Kings 3). According to Mesha's inscription on the Mesha Stele, however, he was completely victorious and regained all the territory of which Israel had deprived him. This battle is the last important date in the history of the Moabites as recorded in the Bible. In the year of Elisha's death they invaded Israel (2 Kings 13:20) and later aided Nebuchadnezzar in his expedition against Jehoiakim (2 Kings 24:2).

Allusions to Moab are frequent in the prophetical books (Isa 25:10; Ezek 25:8–11; Amos 2:1–3; Zephaniah 2:8–11). Two chapters of Isaiah (15 and 16) and one of Jeremiah (48) are devoted to the "burden of Moab". Its prosperity and pride, which the Israelites believed incurred the wrath of God, are frequently mentioned (Isa 16:6; Jer 48:11–29; Zephaniah 2:10), and their contempt for Israel is once expressly noted (Jer. 48:27). Moab would be dealt with during the time of the Messiah's rulership according to the prophets. The book of Zephaniah states that Moab would become "a permanent desolation".

Moab is also made reference to in the 2 Meqabyan, a book considered canonical in the Ethiopian Orthodox Tewahedo Church. In that text, a Moabite king named Maccabeus joins forces with Edom and Amalek to attack Israel, later repenting of his sins and adopting the Israelite religion.

=== In Jewish tradition ===
According to the Hebrew Bible, the Moabites were not hospitable to the Israelites who exited Egypt and hired Balaam to curse them. As a consequence, male Moabites were excluded by Torah law from marrying Jewish women.

The term "tenth generation" used in connection with that prohibition is considered an idiom, used for an unlimited time, as opposed to the third generation, which allows an Egyptian convert to marry into the community. The Talmud expresses the view that the prohibition applied only to male Moabites, who were not allowed to marry born Jews or legitimate converts. Female Moabites, when converted to Judaism, were permitted to marry with only the normal prohibition of a convert marrying a kohen (priest) applying. However, the prohibition was not followed during the Babylonian captivity, and Ezra and Nehemiah sought to compel a return to the law because men had been marrying women who had not been converted at all (Ezra 9:1–2, 12; Nehemiah 13:23–25). The heir of King Solomon was Rehoboam, the son of an Ammonite woman, Naamah (1 Kings 14:21).

On the other hand, the marriages of the Bethlehem Ephrathites (of the tribe of Judah) Mahlon and Chilion to the Moabite women Orpah and Ruth (Ruth 1:2–4), and the marriage of the latter, after her husband's death, to Boaz (Ruth 4:10–13) who by her was the great-grandfather of David, are mentioned with no shade of reproach. The Talmudic explanation, however, is that the language of the law applies only to Moabite and Ammonite men (Hebrew, like all Semitic languages, has grammatical gender). The Talmud also states that the prophet Samuel wrote the Book of Ruth to settle the dispute as the rule had been forgotten since the time of Boaz. Another interpretation is that the Book of Ruth is simply reporting the events in an impartial fashion, leaving any praise or condemnation to be done by the reader.

The Babylonian Talmud in Yevamot 76B explains that one of the reasons was the Ammonites did not greet the Children of Israel with friendship and the Moabites hired Balaam to curse them. The difference in the responses of the two people led to God allowing the Jewish people to harass the Moabites (but not go to war) but forbade them to even harass the Ammonites (Deuteronomy 23:3–4).

Jehoash was one of the four men who pretended to be gods. He was persuaded thereto particularly by the princes, who said to him. "Wert thou not a god thou couldst not come out alive from the Holy of Holies" (Ex R. viii. 3). He was assassinated by two of his servants, one of whom was the son of an Ammonite woman and the other the offspring of a Moabite (2 Chron. 24:26); for God said: "Let the descendants of the two ungrateful families chastise the ungrateful Joash" (Yalk., Ex. 262). Moab and Ammon were the two offspring of Lot's incest with his two daughters as described in Gen. 19:30–38.

Jehoshaphet subsequently joined Jehoram of Israel in a war against the Moabites, who were under tribute to Israel. The Moabites were subdued, but seeing Mesha's act of offering his own son (and singular heir) as a propitiatory human sacrifice on the walls of Kir of Moab filled Israel with horror, and they withdrew and returned to their own land.

According to the Book of Jeremiah, Moab was exiled to Babylon for his arrogance and idolatry. According to Rashi, it was also due to their gross ingratitude even though Abraham, Israel's ancestor, had saved Lot, Moab's ancestor from Sodom. Jeremiah, as well as Ezekiel, prophesies that Moab's captivity will be returned in the end of days.

The book of Zephaniah states that "Moab will assuredly be like Sodom, and the sons of Ammon like Gomorrah—Ground overgrown with weeds and full of salt mines, and a permanent desolation." (2:9). The prophecy regarding their defeat by the Israelites is linked to the conquests by the Jewish Hasmonean king Alexander Jannaeus. During that period, the Moabites were called the "Arabian Moabites".

=== Boundaries in the Hebrew Bible ===
In Ezekiel 25:9 the boundaries are given as being marked by Beth-jeshimoth (north), Baal-meon (east), and Kiriathaim (south). That these limits were not fixed, however, is plain from the lists of cities given in Isaiah 15–16 and Jeremiah 48, where Heshbon, Elealeh, and Jazer are mentioned to the north of Beth-jeshimoth; Madaba, Beth-gamul, and Mephaath to the east of Baalmeon; and Dibon, Aroer, Bezer, Jahaz, and Kirhareseth to the south of Kiriathaim. The principal rivers of Moab mentioned in the Bible are the Arnon, the Dibon or Dimon, and the Nimrim. In the north are a number of long, deep ravines, and Mount Nebo, famous as the scene of the death of Moses (Deuteronomy 34:1–8).

The territory occupied by Moab at the period of its greatest extent, before the invasion of the Amorites, divided itself naturally into three distinct and independent portions: the enclosed corner or canton south of the Arnon, referred to in the Bible as "field of Moab" (Ruth 1:1,2,6). The more open rolling country north of the Arnon, opposite Jericho and up to the hills of Gilead, called the "land of Moab" (Deuteronomy 1:5; 32:49) and the district below sea level in the tropical depths of the Jordan valley (Numbers 22:1).

== Religion ==
References to the religion of Moab are scant. Most of the Moabites followed the ancient Semitic religion like other ancient Semitic-speaking peoples, and the Book of Numbers says that they induced the Israelites to join in their sacrifices (Num 25:2; Judges 10:6). Their chief god seems to have been Chemosh, and the Bible refers to them as the "people of Chemosh" (Num 21:29; Jer 48:46). During the Iron Age, several Moabite cultic sites have been found in places such as Deir Alla, Damiyah, Ataruz or Khirbet al-Mudayna.

According to II Kings, at times, especially in dire peril, human sacrifices were offered to Chemosh, as by Mesha, who gave up his son and heir to him (2 Kings 3:27). Nevertheless, King Solomon built a "high place" for Chemosh on the hill before Jerusalem (1 Kings 11:7), which the Bible describes as "this detestation of Moab". The altar was not destroyed until the reign of Josiah (2 Kings 23:13). The Moabite Stone also mentions (line 17) a female counterpart of Chemosh, Ashtar-Chemosh.

== Language ==
The Moabite language was spoken in Moab. It was a Canaanite language closely related to Biblical Hebrew, Ammonite and Edomite, and was written using a variant of the Phoenician alphabet. Most of our knowledge of it comes from the Mesha Stele, which is the only known extensive text in this language. In addition, there are the three line El-Kerak Inscription and a few seals.

== List of rulers ==
The following is a list of rulers of the ancient kingdom of Moab.

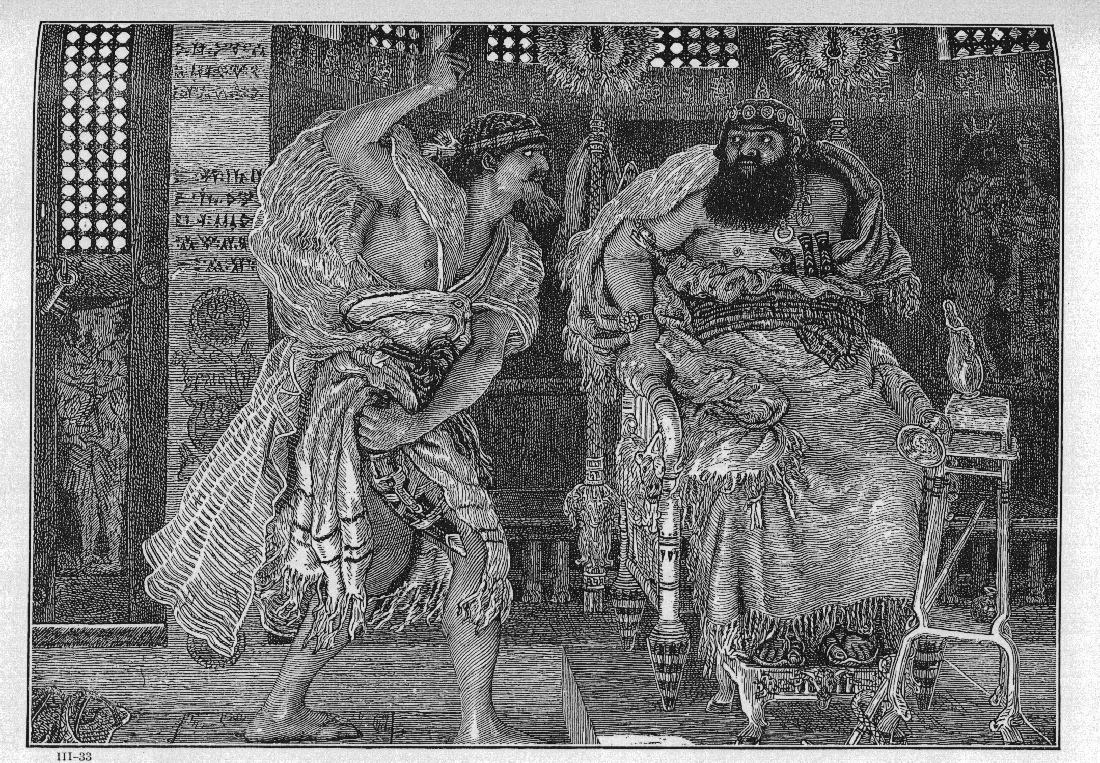
Illustration by Ford Madox Brown of Ehud assassinating the king Eglon

=== Biblical rulers ===
An unnamed ruler listed in Numbers 21:26, possibly Zippor, father of Balak.

Balak, king during the Exodus.

Eglon, king for at least 18 years during the Moabite Oppression before being killed by Ehud.

=== Iron Age ===
Kemoš-yat – reigned thirty years, father and direct predecessor of Mesha. His name is given on the Kerak Inscription.

Mesha – reigned c. 853 BC, launched an attack on Israel after the death of Ahab.

Salmanu – reigned c. 728 BC, known from an inscription during the reign of Tiglath-Pileser III.

=== Assyrian period ===
Kammusu-nadbi – reigned during the third campaign of Sennacherib, c. 701 BC.

Muṣuri – reigned during the early half of the 7th century BC, known from two inscriptions.

Kamas-halta – reigned c. 7th century BC, apparently lost a battle and invoked the name of Ashurbanipal.

Kemoš-[...] – reigned from before c. 589 to probably c. 582 BC. Josephus reports that in the twenty-third year of Nebuchadnezzar II, he campaigned into Moab and Ammon and took it over.

== See also ==
- Plains of Moab, region along the Jordan across from Jericho
