= Mesha Stele =

Moabite stele commemorating Mesha's victory over Israel (c. 840 BCE)

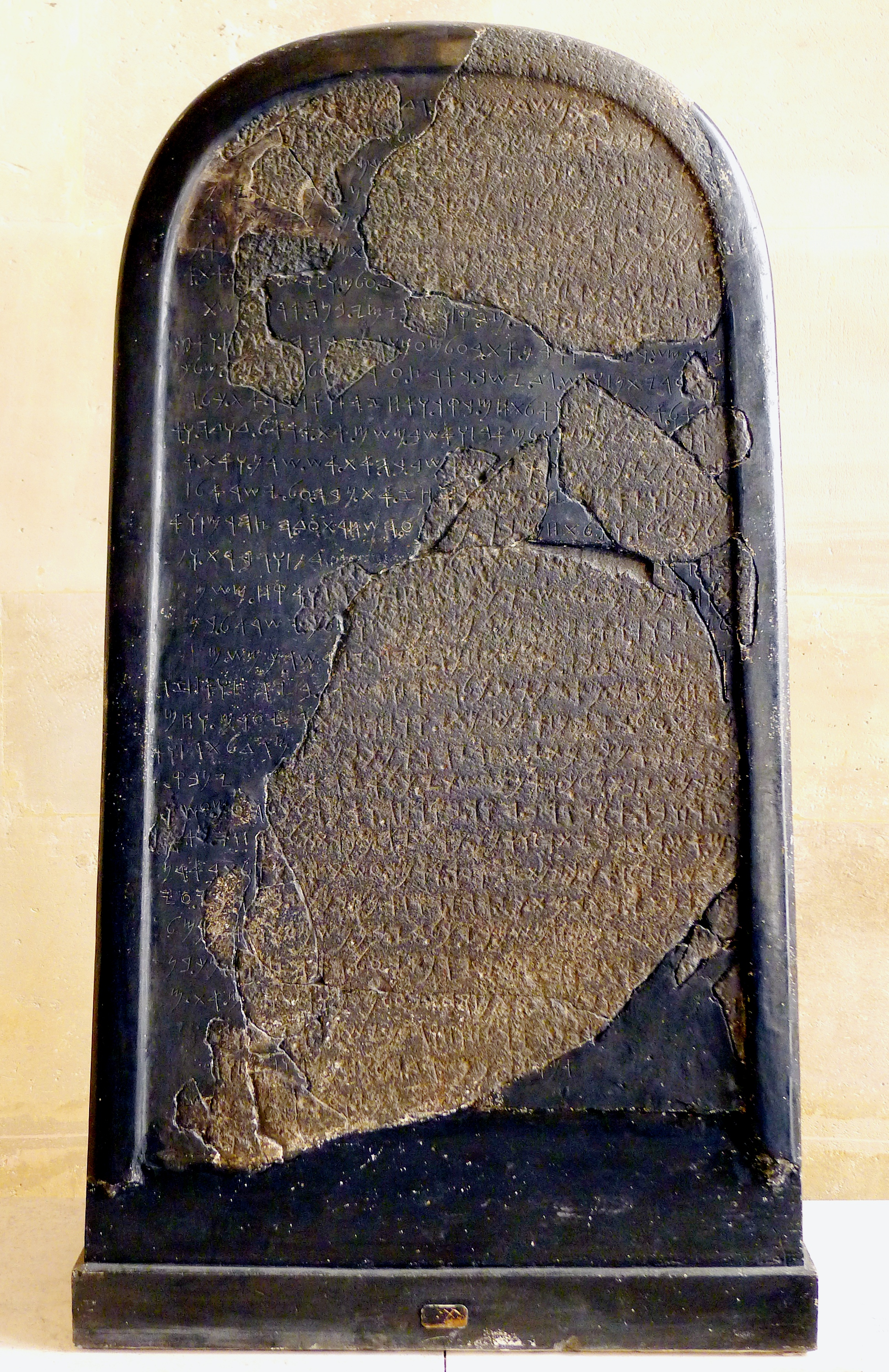
- The Mesha Stele at the Louvre: The brown fragments are pieces of the original stele, whereas the smoother black material is Ganneau's reconstruction from the 1870s.
- Material: Basalt
- Writing: Moabite language
- Created: c. 840 BCE
- Discovered: 1868–70
- Present location: Louvre
- Identification: AO 5066

The Mesha Stele, also known as the Moabite Stone, is a stele dated around 840 BCE containing a significant Canaanite inscription in the name of King Mesha of Moab (a kingdom located in modern Jordan). Mesha tells how Chemosh, the god of Moab, had been angry with his people and had allowed them to be subjugated to the Kingdom of Israel, but at length, Chemosh returned and assisted Mesha to throw off the yoke of Israel and restore the lands of Moab. Mesha also describes his many building projects. It is written in a variant of the Phoenician alphabet, closely related to the Paleo-Hebrew script.

The stone was discovered intact by Frederick Augustus Klein, an Anglican missionary, at the site of ancient Dibon (now Dhiban, Jordan), in August 1868. A "squeeze" (a papier-mâché impression) had been obtained by a local Arab on behalf of Charles Simon Clermont-Ganneau, an archaeologist based in the French consulate in Jerusalem. The next year, the stele was smashed into several fragments by the Bani Hamida tribe, seen as an act of defiance against the Ottoman authorities who had pressured the Bedouins to hand over the stele so that it could be given to Germany. Clermont-Ganneau later managed to acquire the fragments and piece them together thanks to the impression made before the stele's destruction.

The Mesha Stele, the first major epigraphic Canaanite inscription found in the Southern Levant, the longest Iron Age inscription ever found in the region, constitutes the major evidence for the Moabite language, and is a "corner-stone of Semitic epigraphy", and history. The stele, whose story parallels, with some differences, an episode in the Bible's Books of Kings (2 Kings 3:4–27), provides invaluable information on the Moabite language and the political relationship between Moab and Israel at one moment in the 9th century BCE. It is the most extensive inscription ever recovered that refers to the kingdom of Israel (the "House of Omri"); it bears the earliest certain extrabiblical reference to the Israelite God YHWH. It is also one of four known contemporaneous inscriptions containing the name of Israel, the others being the Merneptah Stele, the Tel Dan Stele, and one of the Kurkh Monoliths. Its authenticity has been disputed over the years, and some biblical minimalists suggest the text was not historical, but a biblical allegory. The stele itself is regarded as genuine and historical by the vast majority of biblical archaeologists today.

The stele has been part of the collection of the Louvre Museum in Paris, France, since 1873. Jordan has been demanding the stone slab's return to its place of origin since 2014.

== Description and discovery ==
The stele is a smoothed block of basalt about a meter tall, 60 cm wide, and 60 cm thick, bearing a surviving inscription of 34 lines.

Frederick Klein, an Alsatian Anglican missionary, discovered the stone intact in August 1868 at the site of ancient Dibon (now Dhiban, Jordan). Klein was led to it by Sattam Al-Fayez, son of Fendi Al-Fayez, the tribal chief or emir of the Bani Sakher, although neither of them could read the text. At that time, amateur explorers and archaeologists were scouring the Levant for evidence proving the historicity of the Bible. News of the finding set off a race among France, Britain, and Germany to acquire the piece.

A "squeeze" (a papier-mâché impression) of the full stele had been obtained just before its destruction. Ginsberg's translation of the official report, "Über die Auffindung der Moabitischen Inschrift", (On the Discovery of the Moabite Inscription) stated that Charles Simon Clermont-Ganneau, an archaeologist based in the French consulate in Jerusalem, sent an Arab named Yacoub Caravacca to obtain the squeeze as he "did not want to venture to undertake the very costly [and dangerous] journey" himself. Caravacca was injured by the local Bedouin while obtaining the squeeze, and one of his two accompanying horsemen protected the squeeze by tearing it still damp from the stone in seven fragments before escaping.

In November 1869, the stele was broken by the local Bedouins, the Bani Hamida, after the Ottoman government became involved in the ownership dispute. The previous year the Bani Hamida had been defeated by an Ottoman expedition to Balqa led by Mehmed Rashid Pasha, the head of Syria vilayet. Knowing that a demand to give up the stone to the German Consulate had been ordered by the Ottomans and finding that the ruler of Salt was about to put pressure upon them, they heated the stele in a bonfire, threw cold water upon it and broke it to pieces with boulders.

On 8 February 1870, George Grove of the Palestine Exploration Fund announced the find of the stele in a letter to The Times, attributing the discovery to Charles Warren. On 17 February 1870, the 24-year-old Clermont-Ganneau published the first detailed announcement of the stele in the Revue de l’Instruction Publique. This was followed a month later by a note from F. A. Klein published in The Pall Mall Gazette describing his discovery of the stele in August 1868:

... I afterwards ascertained that [Ganneau's] assertion as to no European having, before me, seen the stone was perfectly true. ... I am sorry to find that I was also the last European who had the privilege of seeing this monument of Hebrew antiquity in its perfect state of preservation. ... The stone was lying among the ruins of Dhiban perfectly free and exposed to view, the inscription uppermost. ... The stone is, as appears from the accompanying sketch, rounded on both sides, and not only at the upper end as mentioned by Monsieur Ganneau. In the lower corner sides there are not as many words of the inscription missing as would be the case if it were square at the bottom, as M. Ganneau was wrongly informed by his authority; for, as in the upper part, so also in the lower, in exactly the same way the lines become smaller by degrees. ... according to my calculation, had thirty-four lines, for the two or three upper lines were very much obliterated. The stone itself was in a most perfect state of preservation not one single piece being broken off, and it was only from great age and exposure to the rain and sun, that certain parts, especially the upper and lower lines, had somewhat suffered.

— F. A. Klein. to George Grove (of the Palestine Exploration Fund), Jerusalem, 23 March 1870, as published in the Pall Mall Gazette of 19 April 1870.

Pieces of the original stele containing most of the inscription, 613 letters out of about a thousand, were later recovered and pieced together. Of the existing stele fragments, the top right fragment contains 150 letters, the bottom right fragment includes 358 letters, the middle right contains 38, and the rest contains 67 letters. The remainder of the stele was reconstructed by Ganneau from the squeeze obtained by Caravacca.

Visiting the site in 1872, Henry B. Tristram was convinced that the stele could not have been exposed for long and believed that it had probably been utilized as building material by the Roman era until thrown down in the Galilee earthquake of 1837.

== Text ==
=== Original ===
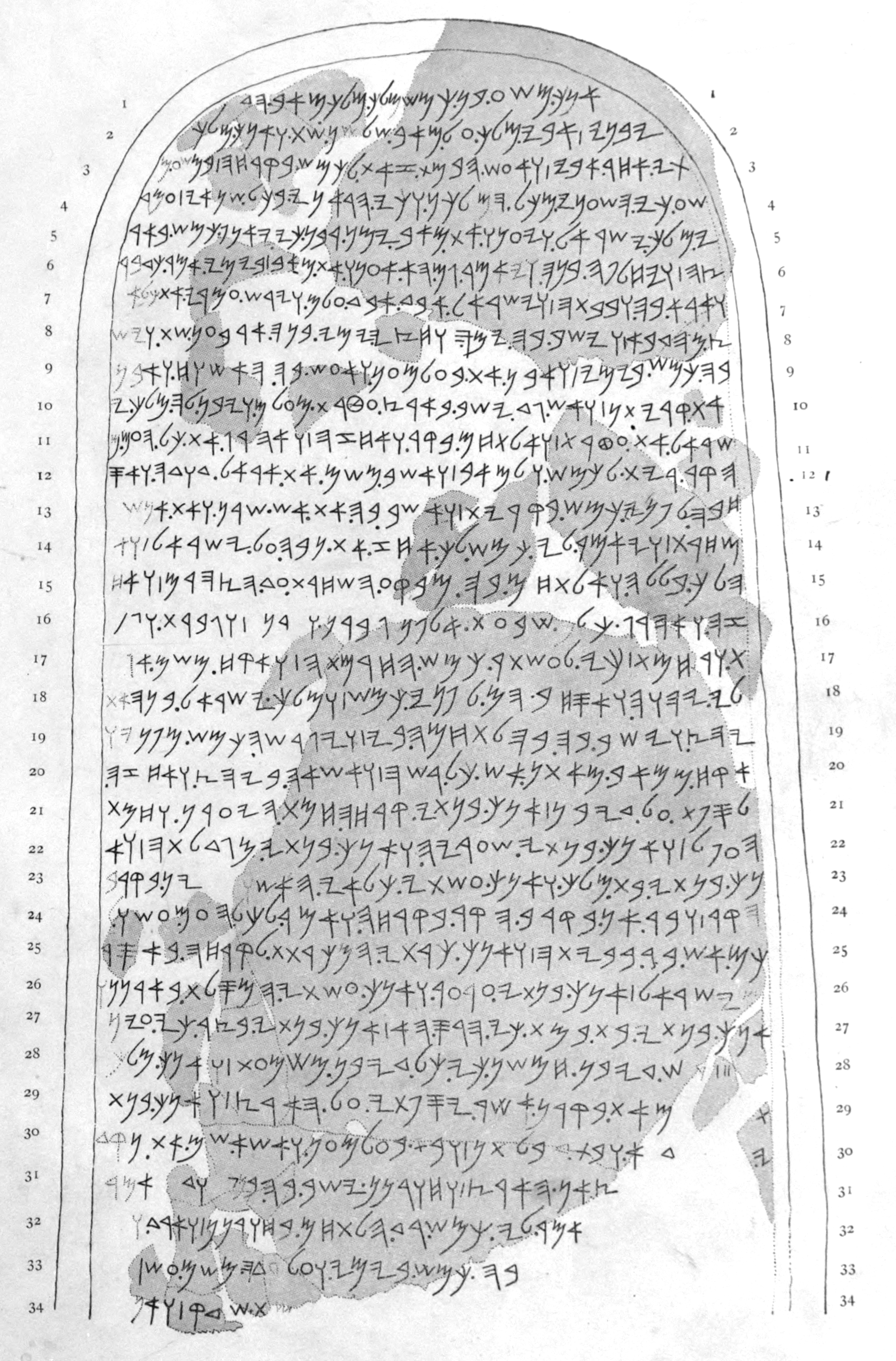
Drawing of the Mesha Stele (or Moabite Stone) by Mark Lidzbarski, published 1898: The shaded area represents pieces of the original stele, whereas the plain white background represents Ganneau's reconstruction from the 1870s based on the squeeze.

The inscription, known as KAI 181 is pictured to the right, and presented here after Compston, 1919, to be read right to left.:

𐤀𐤍𐤊 𐤟 𐤌𐤔𐤏 𐤟 𐤁𐤍 𐤟 𐤊𐤌𐤔𐤌𐤋𐤊 𐤟 𐤌𐤋𐤊 𐤟 𐤌𐤀𐤁 𐤟 𐤄𐤃

𐤉𐤁𐤍𐤉 | 𐤀𐤁𐤉 𐤟 𐤌𐤋𐤊 𐤟 𐤏𐤋 𐤟 𐤌𐤀𐤁 𐤟 𐤔𐤋𐤔𐤍 𐤟 𐤔𐤕 𐤟 𐤅𐤀𐤍𐤊 𐤟 𐤌𐤋𐤊

[𐤕𐤉 𐤟 𐤀𐤇𐤓 𐤟 𐤀𐤁𐤉 | 𐤅𐤀𐤏𐤔 𐤟 𐤄𐤁𐤌𐤕 𐤟 𐤆𐤀𐤕 𐤟 𐤋𐤊𐤌𐤔 𐤟 𐤁𐤒𐤓𐤇𐤄 | 𐤁[𐤍𐤎 𐤟 𐤉

𐤔𐤏 𐤟 𐤊𐤉 𐤟 𐤄𐤔𐤏𐤍𐤉 𐤟 𐤌𐤊𐤋 𐤟 𐤄𐤔̅𐤋𐤊𐤍 𐤟 𐤅𐤊𐤉 𐤟 𐤄𐤓𐤀𐤍𐤉 𐤟 𐤁𐤊𐤋 𐤟 𐤔𐤍𐤀𐤉 | 𐤏𐤌𐤓

𐤉 𐤟 𐤌𐤋𐤊 𐤟 𐤉𐤔𐤓𐤀𐤋 𐤟 𐤅𐤉𐤏𐤍𐤅 𐤟 𐤀𐤕 𐤟 𐤌𐤀𐤁 𐤟 𐤉𐤌𐤍 𐤟 𐤓𐤁𐤍 𐤟 𐤊𐤉 𐤟 𐤉̅𐤀𐤍𐤐 𐤟 𐤊𐤌𐤔 𐤟 𐤁𐤀𐤓

𐤑𐤄 | 𐤅𐤉𐤇𐤋𐤐𐤄 𐤟 𐤁𐤍𐤄 𐤟 𐤅𐤉𐤀𐤌𐤓 𐤟 𐤂𐤌 𐤟 𐤄𐤀 𐤟 𐤀𐤏𐤍𐤅 𐤟 𐤀𐤕 𐤟 𐤌𐤀𐤁 𐤟 | 𐤁𐤉𐤌𐤉 𐤟 𐤀𐤌𐤓 𐤟 𐤊̅

[𐤅𐤀𐤓𐤀 𐤟 𐤁𐤄 𐤟 𐤅𐤁𐤁𐤕𐤄 | 𐤅𐤉𐤔𐤓𐤀𐤋 𐤟 𐤀𐤁𐤃 𐤟 𐤀𐤁𐤃 𐤟 𐤏𐤋𐤌 𐤟 𐤅𐤉𐤓𐤔 𐤟 𐤏𐤌𐤓𐤉 𐤟 𐤀𐤕 𐤟 [𐤀𐤓

𐤑 𐤟 𐤌𐤄𐤃𐤁𐤀 | 𐤅𐤉𐤔𐤁 𐤟 𐤁𐤄 𐤟 𐤉𐤌𐤄 𐤟 𐤅𐤇𐤑𐤉 𐤟 𐤉𐤌𐤉 𐤟 𐤁𐤍𐤄 𐤟 𐤀𐤓𐤁𐤏𐤍 𐤟 𐤔𐤕 𐤟 𐤅̅𐤉𐤔̅

𐤁𐤄 𐤟 𐤊𐤌𐤔 𐤟 𐤁𐤉𐤌𐤉 | 𐤅𐤀𐤁𐤍 𐤟 𐤀𐤕 𐤟 𐤁𐤏𐤋𐤌𐤏𐤍 𐤟 𐤅𐤀𐤏𐤔 𐤟 𐤁𐤄 𐤟 𐤄𐤀𐤔𐤅𐤇 𐤟 𐤅𐤀𐤁𐤍̅

𐤀𐤕 𐤟 𐤒𐤓𐤉𐤕𐤍 | 𐤅𐤀𐤔 𐤟 𐤂𐤃 𐤟 𐤉𐤔𐤁 𐤟 𐤁𐤀𐤓𐤑 𐤟 𐤏𐤈𐤓𐤕 𐤟 𐤌𐤏𐤋𐤌 𐤟 𐤅𐤉𐤁𐤍 𐤟 𐤋𐤄 𐤟 𐤌𐤋𐤊 𐤟𐤉

[ 𐤔𐤓𐤀𐤋 𐤟 𐤀𐤕 𐤟 𐤏𐤈𐤓𐤕 | 𐤅𐤀𐤋𐤕𐤇𐤌 𐤟 𐤁𐤒𐤓 𐤟 𐤅𐤀𐤇𐤆𐤄 | 𐤅𐤀𐤄𐤓𐤂 𐤟 𐤀𐤕 𐤟 𐤊𐤋 𐤟𐤄𐤏𐤌 𐤟 [𐤌

[𐤄𐤒𐤓 𐤟 𐤓𐤉𐤕 𐤟 𐤋𐤊𐤌𐤔 𐤟 𐤅𐤋𐤌𐤀𐤁 | 𐤅𐤀𐤔𐤁 𐤟 𐤌𐤔𐤌 𐤟 𐤀𐤕 𐤟 𐤀𐤓𐤀𐤋 𐤟 𐤃𐤅𐤃𐤄 𐤟 𐤅𐤀[𐤎

𐤇𐤁𐤄 𐤟 𐤋𐤐𐤍𐤉 𐤟 𐤊𐤌𐤔 𐤟 𐤁𐤒𐤓𐤉𐤕 | 𐤅𐤀𐤔𐤁 𐤟 𐤁𐤄 𐤟 𐤀𐤕 𐤟 𐤀𐤔 𐤟 𐤔𐤓𐤍 𐤟 𐤅𐤀𐤕 𐤟 𐤀𐤔

𐤌𐤇𐤓𐤕 | 𐤅𐤉𐤀𐤌𐤓 𐤟 𐤋𐤉 𐤟 𐤊𐤌𐤔 𐤟 𐤋𐤊 𐤟 𐤀𐤇𐤆 𐤟 𐤀𐤕 𐤟 𐤍𐤁𐤄 𐤟 𐤏𐤋 𐤟 𐤉𐤔𐤓𐤀𐤋 | 𐤅𐤀̅

𐤄𐤋𐤊 𐤟 𐤁𐤋𐤋𐤄 𐤟 𐤅𐤀𐤋𐤕𐤇𐤌 𐤟 𐤁𐤄 𐤟 𐤌𐤁𐤒𐤏 𐤟 𐤄𐤔𐤇𐤓𐤕 𐤟 𐤏𐤃 𐤟 𐤄𐤑𐤄𐤓𐤌 | 𐤅𐤀𐤇̅

[𐤆 𐤟 𐤅𐤀𐤄𐤓𐤂 𐤟 𐤊𐤋𐤄̅ 𐤟 𐤔𐤁𐤏𐤕 𐤟 𐤀𐤋𐤐𐤍 𐤟 𐤂[𐤁]𐤓𐤍 𐤟 𐤅𐤂𐤓𐤍 | 𐤅𐤂𐤁𐤓𐤕 𐤟 𐤅[𐤂𐤓

[𐤕 𐤟 𐤅𐤓𐤇𐤌𐤕 | 𐤊𐤉 𐤟 𐤋𐤏𐤔𐤕𐤓 𐤟 𐤊𐤌𐤔 𐤟 𐤄𐤇𐤓𐤌𐤕𐤄 | 𐤅𐤀𐤒𐤇 𐤟 𐤌𐤔𐤌 𐤟 𐤀[𐤕 𐤟 𐤊

𐤋𐤉 𐤟 𐤉𐤄𐤅𐤄 𐤟 𐤅𐤀𐤎𐤇𐤁 𐤟 𐤄𐤌 𐤟 𐤋𐤐𐤍𐤉 𐤟 𐤊𐤌𐤔 | 𐤅𐤌𐤋𐤊 𐤟 𐤉𐤔𐤓𐤀𐤋 𐤟 𐤁𐤍𐤄 𐤟 𐤀̅𐤕̅

[𐤉𐤄𐤑 𐤟 𐤅𐤉𐤔𐤁 𐤟 𐤁𐤄 𐤟 𐤁𐤄𐤋𐤕𐤇𐤌𐤄 𐤟 𐤁𐤉 | 𐤅𐤉𐤂𐤓𐤔𐤄 𐤟 𐤊𐤌𐤔 𐤟 𐤌𐤐𐤍[𐤉 𐤅

𐤟 𐤀𐤒𐤇 𐤟 𐤌𐤌𐤀𐤁 𐤟 𐤌𐤀𐤕𐤍 𐤟 𐤀𐤔 𐤟 𐤊𐤋 𐤟 𐤓𐤔𐤄 | 𐤅𐤀𐤔𐤀𐤄 𐤟 𐤁𐤉𐤄𐤑 𐤟 𐤅𐤀𐤇𐤆𐤄

𐤋𐤎𐤐𐤕 𐤟 𐤏𐤋 𐤟 𐤃𐤉𐤁𐤍 | 𐤀𐤍𐤊 𐤟 𐤁𐤍𐤕𐤉 𐤟 𐤒𐤓𐤇𐤄 𐤟 𐤇𐤌𐤕 𐤟 𐤄𐤉𐤏𐤓𐤍 𐤟 𐤅𐤇𐤌𐤕

𐤄𐤏𐤐𐤋 | 𐤅𐤀𐤍𐤊 𐤟 𐤁𐤍𐤕𐤉 𐤟 𐤔𐤏𐤓𐤉𐤄 𐤟 𐤅𐤀𐤍𐤊 𐤟 𐤁𐤍𐤕𐤉 𐤟 𐤌𐤂𐤃𐤋𐤕𐤄 | 𐤅𐤀

𐤍𐤊 𐤟 𐤁𐤍𐤕𐤉 𐤟 𐤁𐤕 𐤟 𐤌𐤋𐤊 𐤟 𐤅𐤀𐤍𐤊 𐤟 𐤏𐤔𐤕𐤉 𐤟 𐤊𐤋𐤀𐤉 𐤟 𐤄𐤀𐤔[𐤅𐤇 𐤟 𐤋𐤌]𐤉𐤍 𐤟 𐤁𐤒𐤓𐤁̅

𐤄𐤒𐤓 | 𐤅𐤁𐤓 𐤟 𐤀𐤍 𐤟 𐤁𐤒𐤓𐤁 𐤟 𐤄𐤒𐤓 𐤟 𐤁𐤒𐤓𐤇𐤄 𐤟 𐤅𐤀𐤌𐤓 𐤟 𐤋𐤊𐤋 𐤟 𐤄𐤏𐤌 𐤟 𐤏𐤔𐤅 𐤟 𐤋̅

𐤊𐤌 𐤟 𐤀𐤔 𐤟 𐤁𐤓 𐤟 𐤁𐤁𐤉𐤕𐤄 | 𐤅𐤀𐤍𐤊 𐤟 𐤊𐤓𐤕𐤉 𐤟 𐤄𐤌𐤊𐤓𐤕𐤕 𐤟 𐤋𐤒𐤓𐤇𐤄 𐤟 𐤁𐤀𐤎𐤓

𐤟 𐤉] 𐤟 𐤉𐤔𐤓𐤀𐤋 | 𐤀𐤍𐤊 𐤟 𐤁𐤍𐤕𐤉 𐤟 𐤏𐤓𐤏𐤓 𐤟 𐤅𐤀𐤍𐤊 𐤟 𐤏𐤔𐤕𐤉 𐤟 𐤄𐤌𐤎𐤋𐤕 𐤟 𐤁𐤀𐤓𐤍𐤍]

𐤟 𐤀𐤍𐤊 𐤟 𐤁𐤍𐤕𐤉 𐤟 𐤁𐤕 𐤟 𐤁𐤌𐤕 𐤟 𐤊𐤉 𐤟 𐤄𐤓𐤎 𐤟 𐤄𐤀 | 𐤀𐤍𐤊 𐤟 𐤁𐤍𐤕𐤉 𐤟 𐤁𐤑𐤓 𐤟 𐤊𐤉 𐤟 𐤏𐤉𐤍

𐤔 𐤟 𐤃𐤉𐤁𐤍 𐤟 𐤇𐤌𐤔𐤍 𐤟 𐤊𐤉 𐤟 𐤊𐤋 𐤟 𐤃𐤉𐤁𐤍 𐤟 𐤌𐤔𐤌𐤏𐤕 | 𐤅𐤀𐤍𐤊 𐤟 𐤌𐤋𐤊̅

𐤕𐤉̅.. 𐤌𐤀𐤕 𐤟 𐤁𐤒𐤓𐤍 𐤟 𐤀𐤔𐤓 𐤟 𐤉𐤎𐤐𐤕𐤉 𐤟 𐤏𐤋 𐤟 𐤄𐤀𐤓𐤑 | 𐤅𐤀𐤍𐤊 𐤟 𐤁𐤍𐤕

𐤉 𐤟 [𐤀𐤕 𐤟] 𐤌̅𐤄̅𐤃[𐤁]𐤀 𐤟 𐤅𐤁𐤕 𐤟 𐤃𐤁𐤋𐤕𐤍 | 𐤅𐤁𐤕 𐤟 𐤁𐤏𐤋𐤌𐤏𐤍 𐤟 𐤅𐤀𐤔𐤀 𐤟 𐤔𐤌 𐤟 𐤀𐤕 𐤟 𐤅𐤒̅𐤃̅

𐤑𐤀𐤍 𐤟 𐤄𐤀𐤓𐤑 | 𐤅𐤇𐤅𐤓𐤍𐤍 𐤟 𐤉𐤔𐤁 𐤟 𐤁𐤄 𐤟 𐤁𐤕̅ 𐤟 𐤅𐤒̅ 𐤟 𐤀𐤔̅....

𐤅̅𐤉𐤀𐤌𐤓 𐤟 𐤋𐤉 𐤟 𐤊𐤌𐤔 𐤟 𐤓𐤃 𐤟 𐤄𐤋𐤕𐤇𐤌 𐤟 𐤁𐤇𐤅𐤓𐤍𐤍 | 𐤅𐤀𐤓̅𐤃̅....

𐤅𐤉𐤔]𐤁𐤄 𐤟 𐤊𐤌𐤔 𐤟 𐤁𐤉𐤌𐤉 𐤟 𐤅𐤏𐤋 𐤟 𐤓𐤄 𐤟 𐤌𐤔𐤌 𐤟 𐤏𐤔].....

𐤔̅𐤕 𐤟 𐤔𐤃𐤒 | 𐤅𐤀𐤍 ............

=== Content overview ===
It describes:

- How Moab was oppressed by Omri King of Israel and his son as the result of the anger of the god Chemosh
- Mesha's victories over Omri's son (not named) and the men of Gad at Ataroth, Nebo and Jehaz
- His building projects, restoring the fortifications of his strong places and building a palace and reservoirs for water
- His wars against Horonan (Moabite: 𐤇𐤅𐤓𐤍𐤍 *Ḥawrānān), see lines 31 and 32, possibly referring to the city of Horonaim
- A now-lost conclusion in the destroyed final lines

=== Translations ===
Here is the beginning of a transliteration and translation by Alviero Niccacci from his article "The Stele of Mesha and the Bible: Verbal System and Narrativity" in Orientalia NOVA SERIES, Vol. 63, No. 3 (1994), pp. 226–248.

1-2. ʔnk.mšʕ.bn.kmš(yt).mlk.mʔb.hdybny / ʔby.mlk.ʕl.mʔb.šlšn.št
3. wʔnk.mlkty.ʔḥr.ʔb / wʔʕś.hbmt.zʔt.lkmš.bqrḥh /
4. b(mtʔ).yšʕ.ky.hšʕny.mkl.hšʕlkn.
wky.hrʔny.bkl.śnʔy /

Translation:

I am Mesha, son of Kemosh(yat), king of Moab, the Dibonite. My father ruled over Moab for thirty years,
and I ruled after my father. I made this high place for Kemosh in Qerihoh.
(a) high pl(ace of salv)ation because he saved me from all predators
and because he made me triumph over all my enemies.

5 ʕmry.mlk.yśrʔl.wyʕnw.ʔt.mʔb.ymn.rbn.
6 ky.yʔnp.kmš.bʔrṣh./ wyḥlph.bnh.
wyʔmr.gm.hʔ. ʔʕnw.ʔt.mʔb./ bymy.ʔmr.k(n)

Translation:

Now as for Omri, King of Israel, he oppressed Moab for many days
because Kemosh was angry with his land. And his son succeeded him,
and he also said: "I will oppress Moab." It was during my days that he said th(is),

Apart from that by Shmuel Ahituv, no authoritative full editions of the Moabite inscription exist. The translation used here is that published by James King (1878), based on translations by M. Ganneau and Dr. Ginsberg. Though line numbers included in the published version have been removed for the rendition below. A century and a half of scholarship has greatly improved our understanding of the text, so accessing other translations linked here, such as that by Ahituv, is recommended, rather than relying on this very outdated one.

I am Mesha, son of Chemosh-gad, king of Moab, the Dibonite. My father reigned over Moab thirty years, and I have reigned after my father. And I have built this sanctuary for Chemosh in Karchah, a sanctuary of salvation, for he saved me from all aggressors, and made me look upon all mine enemies with contempt.

Omri was king of Israel, and oppressed Moab during many days, and Chemosh was angry with his aggressions. His son succeeded him, and he also said, I will oppress Moab. In my days he said, Let us go, and I will see my desire upon him and his house, and Israel said, I shall destroy it for ever. Now Omri took the land of Madeba, and occupied it in his day, and in the days of his son, forty years. And Chemosh had mercy on it in my time. And I built Baal-meon and made therein the ditch, and I built Kiriathaim.

And the men of Gad dwelled in the country of Ataroth from ancient times, and the king of Israel fortified Ataroth. I assaulted the wall and captured it, and killed all the warriors of the city for the well-pleasing of Chemosh and Moab, and I removed from it all the spoil, and offered it before Chemosh in Kirjath; and I placed therein the men of Siran, and the men of Mochrath. And Chemosh said to me, Go take Nebo against Israel, and I went in the night and I fought against it from the break of day till noon, and I took it: and I killed in all seven thousand men...women and maidens, for I devoted them to Ashtar-Chemosh; and I took from it the vessels of Jehovah, and offered them before Chemosh.

And the king of Israel fortified Jahaz, and occupied it, when he made war against me, and Chemosh drove him out before me, and I took from Moab two hundred men in all, and placed them in Jahaz, and took it to annex it to Dibon.

I built Karchah the wall of the forest, and the wall of the Hill. I have built its gates and I have built its towers. I have built the palace of the king, and I made the prisons for the criminals within the wall. And there were no wells in the interior of the wall in Karchah. And I said to all the people, 'Make you every man a well in his house.' And I dug the ditch for Karchah with the chosen men of Israel. I built Aroer, and I made the road across the Arnon. I built Beth-Bamoth for it was destroyed. I built Bezer for it was cut down by the armed men of Dibon, for all Dibon was now loyal; and I reigned from Bikran, which I added to my land. And I built Beth-Gamul, and Beth-Diblathaim...Beth Baal-Meon, and I placed there the poor people of the land.

And as to Horonaim, the men of Edom dwelt therein, on the descent from old. And Chemosh said to me, Go down, make war against Horonaim, and take it. And I assaulted it, And I took it, for Chemosh restored it in my days. Wherefore I made.... ...year...and I....

There is also a more modern translation by William F. Albright on pages 320–321 of Ancient Near Eastern Texts (ed. Pritchard, 1969):

A yet newer translation was presented in a vici.org page authored by Jona Lendering, and an up-to-date academic text edition with a translation and commentary was published by Shmuel Ahituv in English in 2008, and in Hebrew in 2012.

== Interpretation ==
=== Analysis ===
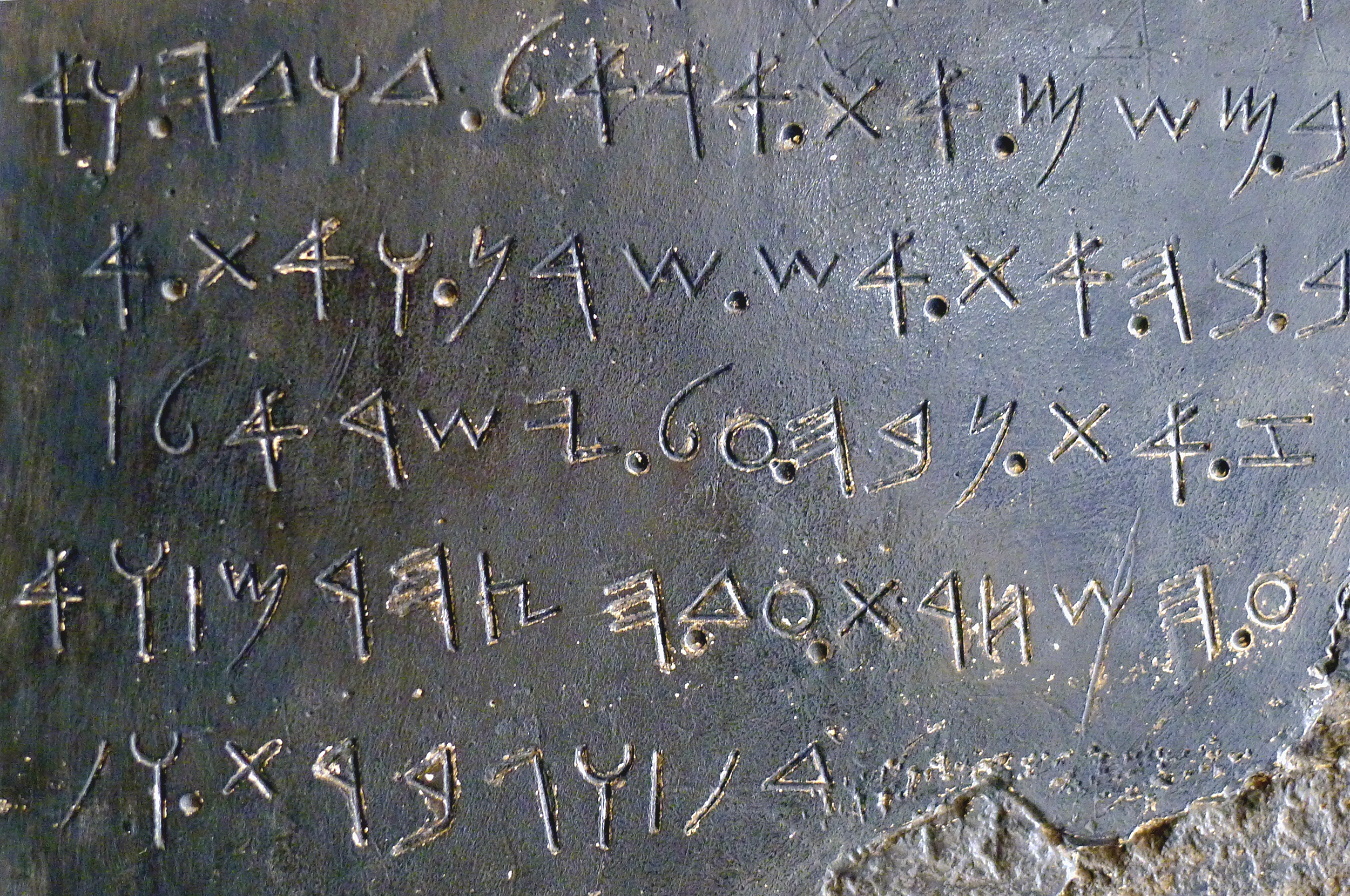
Detail of a portion of lines 12–16, reconstructed from the squeeze. The middle line (14), transliterated as:את. נבה. על. ישראל ( ʔt nbh ʕl yšrʔl )reads "[Take] Nabau against Israel"

The Mesha Stele is the longest Iron Age inscription ever found in the region, the major evidence for the Moabite language, and a unique record of military campaigns. The occasion was the erection of a sanctuary for Chemosh in Qarho, the acropolis (citadel) of Dibon, Mesha's capital, in thanks for his aid against Mesha's enemies. Chemosh is credited with an important role in the victories of Mesha, but is not mentioned in connection with his building activities, reflecting the crucial need to give recognition to the nation's god in the life-and-death national struggle. The fact that the numerous building projects would have taken years to complete suggests that the inscription was made long after the military campaigns, or at least most of them, and the account of those campaigns reflects a royal ideology that wishes to present the king as the obedient servant of the god. The king also claims to be acting in the national interest by removing Israelite oppression and restoring lost lands, but a close reading of the narrative leaves it unclear whether all the conquered territories were previously Moabite – in three campaign stories, no explicit reference is made to prior Moabite control. The town of Atoroth is very probably Khirbat Ataruz.

=== Parallel to 2 Kings 3 ===
The inscription seems to parallel an episode in 2 Kings 3: Jehoram of Israel makes an alliance with Jehoshaphat king of Judah and an unnamed king of Edom (south of Judah) to put down his rebellious vassal Mesha; the three kings have the best of the campaign until Mesha, in desperation, sacrifices to his god Chemosh either his eldest son or the eldest son of the king of Edom; the sacrifice turns the tide, "there came great wrath against Israel", and Mesha apparently achieves victory. This apparent correspondence is the basis of the usual dating of the inscription to about 840 BCE, but André Lemaire has cautioned that the identification is not certain and the stele may be as late as 810 BCE.

=== Proposed references to David and "House of David" ===
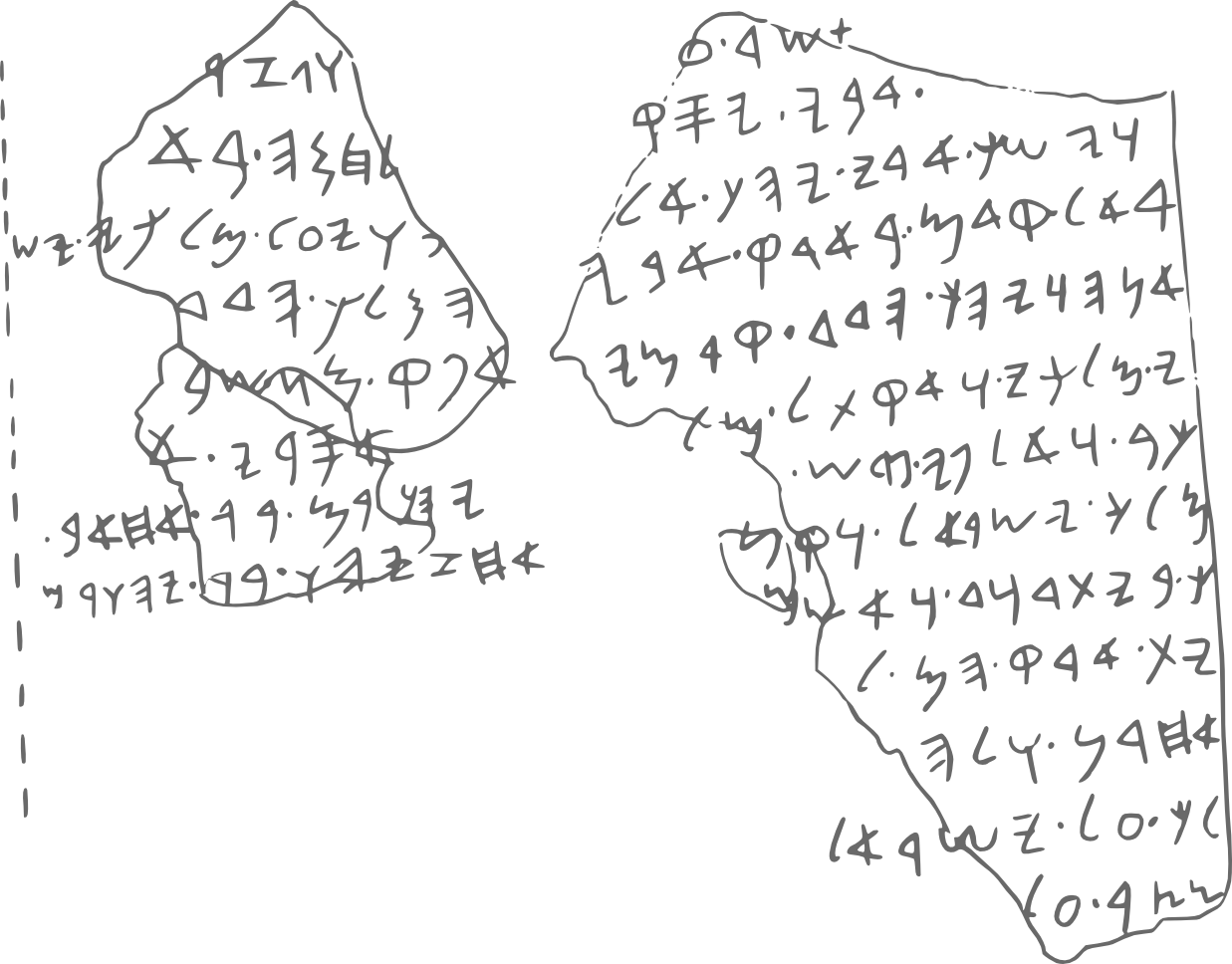
The Tel Dan Stele: Fragment A is to the right, Fragments B1 and B2 to the left

The discovery of the Tel Dan Stele led to a re-evaluation of the Mesha Stele by some scholars. In 1994, André Lemaire reconstructed BT[D]WD as "House of David", meaning Judah, in line 31. This section is badly damaged, but appears to tell of Mesha's reconquest of the southern lands of Moab, just as the earlier part dealt with victories in the north. Line 31 says that he captured Horonen from someone who was occupying it. Just who the occupants were is unclear. The legible letters were taken by Lemaire to be BT[*]WD, with the square brackets representing a damaged space that probably contained just one letter. This is not universally accepted—Nadav Na'aman, for instance, suggested it as BT[D]WD[H], "House of Daodoh", a local ruling family. Were Lemaire correct, the stele would provide the earliest evidence of the existence of the Judean kingdom and its Davidic dynasty.

In 2001, Anson Rainey proposed that a two-word phrase in line 12—'R'L DWDH—should be read as a reference to an "altar hearth of David" at Ataroth, one of the towns captured by Mesha. The sentence reads: "I (i.e., Mesha) carried from there (Atartoth) the 'R'L of its DWD (or: its 'R'L of DVD) and I dragged it before Chemosh in Qeriot". The meaning of both words is unclear. One line of thought sees 'R'L as the name of a man (literally "El is my light") and translates DWD as "defender", so that the sense of the passage is that Mesha, having conquered Ataroth, dragged its "defender", whose name was "El is my light", to the altar of Chemosh, where he was presumably sacrificed. It seems more likely that some kind of cult-vessel is meant, and other suggestions have included "the lion-statue of its beloved", meaning the city god.

In 2019, Israel Finkelstein, Nadav Na'aman and Thomas Römer concluded, on the basis of high-resolution photographs of the squeeze, that the monarch mentioned is referred to by three consonants, beginning with 'B', and the most probable candidate is not David, but Balak, a biblical Moabite. Disagreeing, Michael Langlois pointed to his own new imaging methods that "confirm" line 31 contains the phrase "House of David". A similar judgment was expressed by biblical scholar Ronald Hendel, who noted that Balak lived 200 years before David and, therefore, a reference to him would not make sense; Hendel also dismissed Finkelstein's hypothesis as "nothing more than a guess". Matthieu Richelle argues that the supposed dividing stroke that Finkelstein, Na'aman and Römer cite as evidence that the name of the monarch began with a 'B' does not appear on the stone itself, but as part of a later reconstruction made of plaster.

In 2022, the epigraphists André Lemaire and Jean-Philippe Delorme argued that newer photographs using Reflectance Transformation Imaging by a team part of the West Semitic Research Project of the University of Southern California in 2015, as well as high-resolution backlit pictures of the squeeze by the Louvre Museum in 2018, supported their view that line 31 of the Mesha Stele contains a reference to King David. This evidence is regarded as inconclusive by Matthieu Richelle and Andrew Burlingame, who hold that the reading "House of David" in the stele remains uncertain.

=== Authenticity ===
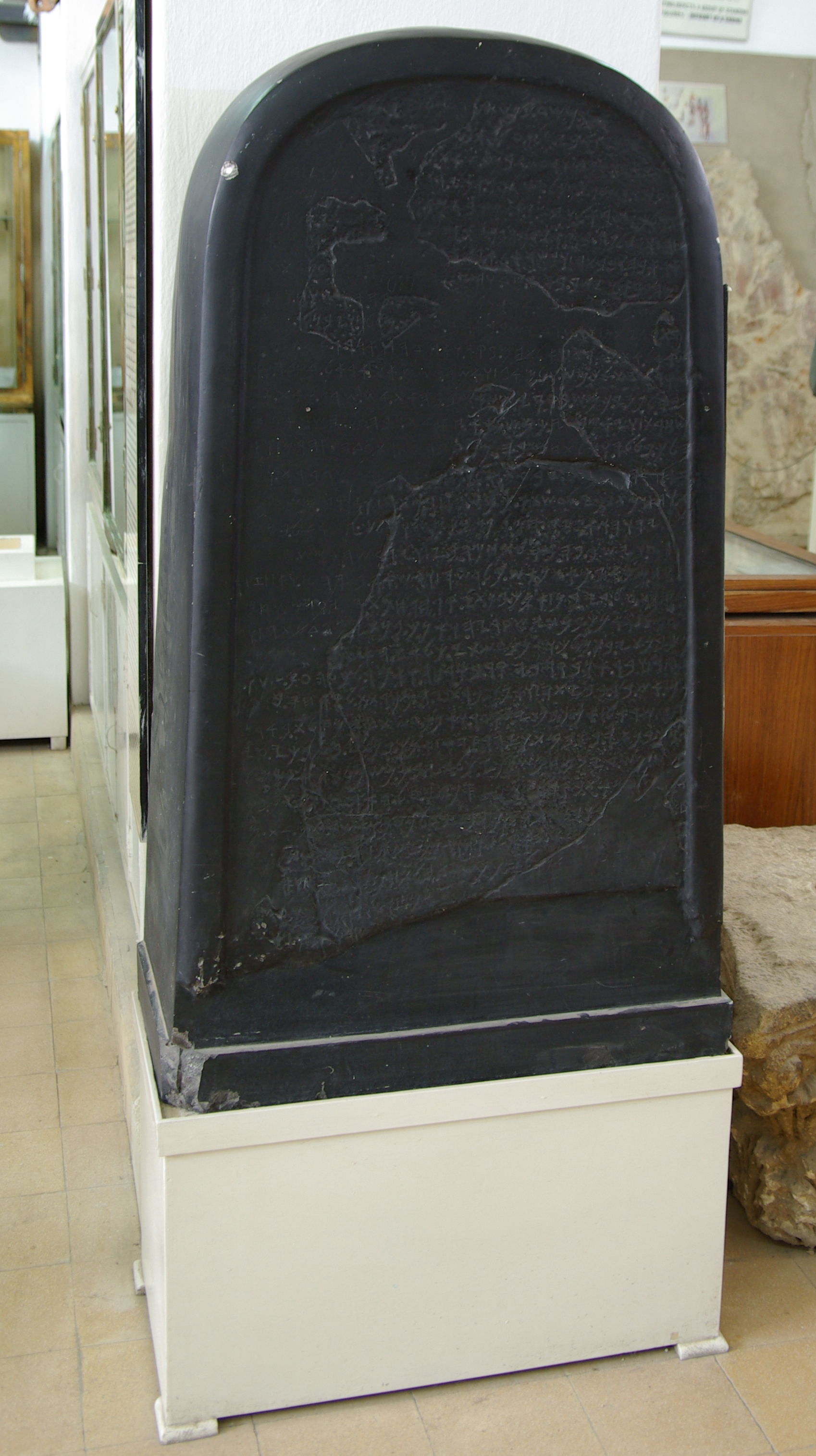
A replica of the stele on display at the Jordan Archaeological Museum in Amman, 70 km north of its original location in Dhiban.

In the years following the discovery of the stele a number of scholars questioned its authenticity.

The stele is regarded as of genuine antiquity by the vast majority of biblical archaeologists on the basis that no other inscriptions in this script or language of comparable age were yet known to scholars at the time of its discovery. At that time the Assyrian lion weights were the oldest Phoenician-style inscription that had been discovered.

In 2010, the discovery of the Khirbat Ataruz Inscribed Altar inscriptions by archaeologist Chang-ho Ji at an ancient Moabite sanctuary site in Jordan provided further evidence for the Mesha Stele's authenticity. The authenticity of the stele is considered wholly established and undisputed by biblical archaeologists.

=== Minimalist views ===
Thomas L. Thompson, a former professor of theology at the University of Copenhagen, closely associated with the Biblical minimalism movement known as the Copenhagen School, which holds that "Israel" is a problematic concept, believes that the inscription on the Mesha stele is not historical, but an allegory. In 2000, he wrote: "Rather than an historical text, the Mesha inscription belongs to a substantial literary tradition of stories about kings of the past... The phrase "Omri, king of Israel," eponym of the highland patronate Bit Humri, belongs to a theological world of Narnia." This view has received criticism by John Emerton and André Lemaire, who have both reasserted the historical value of the Mesha Stele.

== See also ==
- Kerak Inscription
- Merneptah Stele
- Siloam inscription

== Bibliography and further reading ==
- Albright, William F. (1945). "Is the Mesha Inscription a Forgery?". The Jewish Quarterly Review. 35 (3). University of Pennsylvania Press: 247–250. doi:10.2307/1452186. JSTOR 1452186.
- Dearman, J. Andrew (1989). Studies in the Mesha inscription and Moab. Scholars Press. ISBN 1555403565. OCLC 20090681.
- Green, Douglas J. (2010). "I Undertook Great Works": The Ideology of Domestic Achievements in West Semitic Royal Inscriptions. Mohr Siebeck. ISBN 9783161501685.
- Ginsberg, Christian (1871). The Moabite Stone A Facsimile of the Original Inscription (PDF). Reeves and Turner. Archived from the original (PDF) on 31 March 2012.
- King, James (1878). Moab's Patriarchal Stone: being an account of the Moabite stone, its story and teaching. Bickers and Son.
- Lemaire, André (2007). "The Mesha Stele and the Omri Dynasty". In Grabbe, Lester L. (ed.). Ahab Agonistes: The Rise and Fall of the Omri Dynasty. Bloomsbury Publishing USA. ISBN 978-0-567-25171-8.
- Lemche, Niels Peter (1998). The Israelites in History and Tradition. Westminster John Knox Press. ISBN 9780664227272.
- Lipiński, Edward (2006). On the Skirts of Canaan in the Iron Age: Historical and Topographical Researches. Peeters Publishing. ISBN 9789042917989.
- Mykytiuk, Lawrence J. (2004). Identifying Biblical Persons in Northwest Semitic Inscriptions of 1200–539 B.C.E. Society of Biblical Literature. ISBN 9781589830622.
- Parker, Simon B. (1997). Stories in Scripture and Inscriptions: Comparative Studies on Narratives in Northwest Semitic Inscriptions and the Hebrew Bible. Oxford University Press. ISBN 9780195353822.
- Rainey, Anson F. (2001). "Mesha and Syntax". In Dearman, J. Andrew; Graham, M. Patrick (eds.). The Land That I Will Show You. Sheffield Academic Press Supplement Series, no. 343. ISBN 9781841272573.
- Richelle, Matthieu (2021). "A Re-Examination of the Reading BT DWD ("House of David") on the Mesha Stele". Eretz-Israel: Archaeological, Historical and Geographical Studies. 34: 152*–159*. ISSN 0071-108X. JSTOR 27165968.
- Rollston, Chris A. (2010). Writing and Literacy in the World of Ancient Israel: Epigraphic Evidence from the Iron Age. Society of Biblical Literature. ISBN 9781589831070.
- Schmidt, Brian B. (2006). "Neo-Assyrian and Syro-Palestinian Texts I: the Moabite stone". In Chavalas, Mark William (ed.). The Ancient Near East: Historical Sources in Translation. John Wiley & Sons. ISBN 9780631235804.
