= Dhiban, Jordan =

Dhiban ذيبان
- City
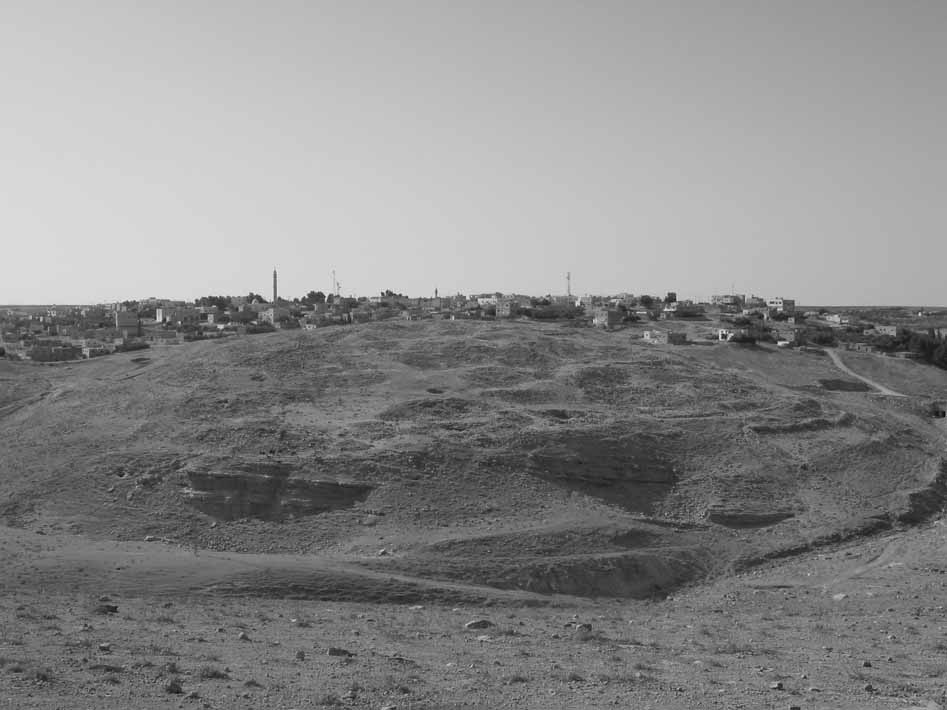
- Ancient Dhiban with modern settlement in the background, looking south

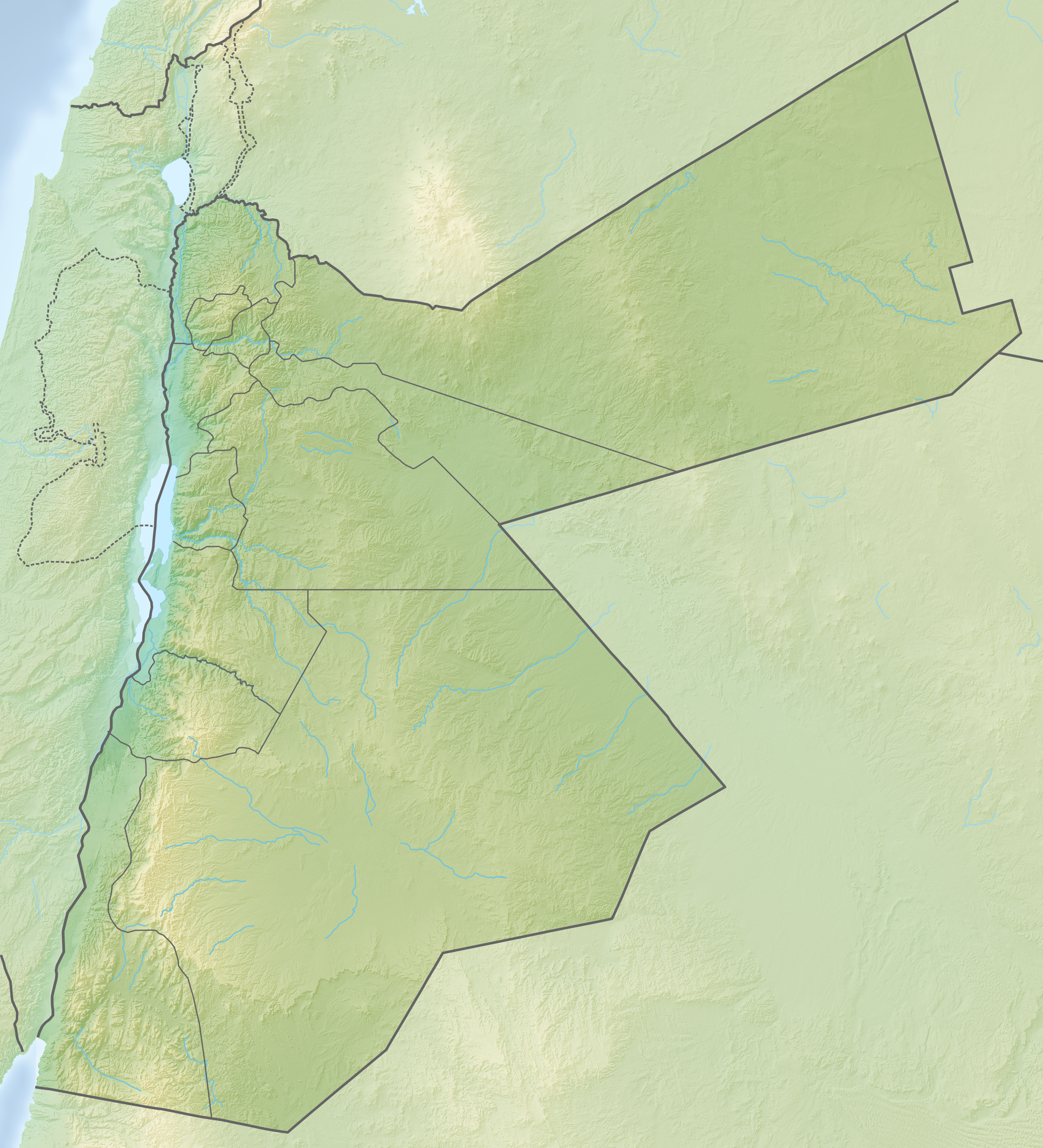
- Location within Jordan
- Coordinates: 31°29′56″N 35°47′8″E
- Country: Jordan
- Governorate: Madaba Governorate
- Founded: 2000 BC

Government
  - Type: Municipality
  - Mayor: Salim Hawawsheh

Area
  - City: 10.24 km^{2} (3.95 sq mi)
  - Metro: 20.35 km^{2} (7.86 sq mi)
- Elevation: 726 m (2,382 ft)

Population
  - Metro: 13,043
- Time zone: GMT +2
  - Summer (DST): +3
- Area code: +(962)5

Dhiban (Arabic: ذيبان, romanized: Ḏībān) is a Jordanian town located in Madaba Governorate approximately 70 kilometres (43 mi) south of Amman and east of the Dead Sea.

Previously nomadic, the current community settled the town in the 1950s. Dhiban's current population is approximately 15,000, with many residents working in the army, government agencies, or engaged in seasonal agricultural production. Several young people study in nearby universities in al Karak, Madaba, and Amman. Most inhabitants practise Islam.

== History ==
This was the site of an ancient Moabite town (Moabite: 𐤃𐤉𐤁𐤍, romanized: Daybōn;, Biblical Hebrew: דִּיבוֹן, romanized: Dîḇōn (Note: In the Book of Isaiah it is thought it is referred to as Dimon)). The ancient settlement lies adjacent to the modern town. Excavations have revealed that the site was occupied intermittently over the past 5,000 years, its earliest occupation occurring in the Early Bronze Age in the third millennium BC. The site's extensive settlement history is in part due to its location on the King's Highway, a major commercial route in antiquity. The majority of evidence for this population is concentrated in a 15-hectare tel. The release of the Mesha Inscription in 1868 led to an upsurge in visitors to the town (including tourists and scholars) due to its ostensible confirmation of biblical passages.

=== Bronze Age ===
The site was occupied in the Early Bronze Age based on the finds of Canaanean blades. The earliest archaeological settlement remains date to the Iron Age.

=== Dhiban and the Israelites ===
The Hebrew Bible calls the city Divon or Divon Gad (דִּיבֹן גָּד Diḇon Gād) because it was said to have been occupied by the tribe of Gad.

According to the Bible, the city was conquered by the Amorite king Sihon from the Moabites. Later, it fell into the hands of the Israelites and was allocated to either the tribe of Gad or Reuben. According to the Mesha Stele, which was found at the site, the Moabite king Mesha ruled from Divon in the 9th century BC after his father had ruled it for 30 years. It was thus probably a Moabite town from at least the late 10th century BC. Biblical texts suggest that Divon remained under Moabite control until the end of the Southern Levantine Iron Age. Archaeological excavations conducted in the 1950s revealed settlements dating back to the Chalcolithic (early 5th millennium BCE), as well as later structures. However, in the early sixth century BCE, the Neo-Babylonian Empire destroyed Divon alongside Judah and Jerusalem and the region remained uninhabited until the Roman era.

=== Mesha and the Iron Age Moabite Kingdom ===
The Mesha Stele, discovered in this region, describes the histories of Divon, Moab, and the Kingdom of Judah. The inscription recounts King Mesha's rebellion against the northern Kingdom of Israel (Samaria), a pivotal event referenced in 2 Kings 3 in the Bible.

The Mesha Stele linked the tell (archaeological site) at Dhiban with the biblical Divon, while also implying that it was the capital of Mesha, a prominent Moabite king; however, its role in Mesha's reign has not been confirmed. In the Iron IIb period (IIb–c: 925–586 BCE), the tell at Dhiban underwent at least three large building projects. The site was artificially enlarged during this period, incorporating several new architectural features. These include retaining walls, towers, and a monumental city wall. The dates of these features' construction have not been confirmed, but they may be somewhere between the 9th and 8th centuries BCE. These large buildings appear to have been abandoned in the Iron IIc period. The site also featured a large necropolis to the northeast of the tel. This contained multi-generational burials with corresponding funerary offerings, and one had a clay coffin with an anthropomorphic lid. The necropolis appears to be contemporary with these building projects.

Another name for Dibon was Karchoh, and possibly in the ninth century, the name Divon referred to a tribe of which Mesha was the leader, and that the name Dibon was attached to the town later.

Modern scholarship, such as the works of historians Israel Finkelstein, Nadav Na'aman, and Thomas Römer, emphasizes how the Meshe Stele serves as a lens to understand the historical relationship between Moab and Israel. The stele remains central to discussions about Israel–Jordan relations today, as it symbolizes a reflection of political complexities that date to the time of King David of the early united Kingdom of Israel and King Balaq of Moab.

=== Hellenistic Dhiban and the Nabataeans ===
There has been little evidence recovered from the site for the eras of the Achaemenid Empire, the Hellenistic period, and the early Nabataean Kingdom. However, evidence indicates that the site became part of Nabataea in the mid-1st century BC. These include Nabataean-style ceramics, coins, and architecture (such as a temple with a Nabataean-like layout, Nabataean masonry, an aqueduct, retaining wall, and monumental stairway).

=== Roman and Byzantine Dhiban ===
In 106 CE, the Romans incorporated Nabataea into their empire, including Divon. Nabataean monumental buildings were abandoned, and there were indications of a decline in population at the site. Coins, a multi-generational family tomb, and an inscription indicate that the site did remain inhabited, and there were building projects during this time. The inscription also suggests that the Romans maintained a road near the site, which might have been the King's Highway. In the later Roman and Byzantine eras, the population of Divon began to increase gradually. It was mentioned in Eusebius’ Onomasticon as a very large village in the 4th century. Excavations have uncovered two significant buildings from this period: a therma and two church buildings.

=== Early and Middle Islamic Periods ===
The exact date of Dhiban's refounding after the Muslim conquest of the Levant is under debate. It could be from the 7th to 8th century Umayyad Caliphate or the 8th to 9th century Abbasid Caliphate. The community thrived during this time and covered most of the current tell by the time of the 14th century rule by the Mamluk Sultanate, if not earlier during the 13th century Ayyubid period. Several structures on the site have been dated to this period using coins and ceramics.

In 1261, the Mamluk sultan Baybars granted Dhiʾban as an iqṭāʿ "tax farm" to the son of an Ayyubid prince. Dhiʾban prospered throughout the 1200s and 1300s. It lay on the region's main trade route and supplied meat to nearby towns. The town had a diverse agricultural economy, with einkorn and barley supplemented with grapes, figs, lentils, and chickpeas. Agriculture in Dhiʾban depended heavily on the use of cisterns for irrigation, since the semi-arid climate made rainfall uncertain. The farmers practised multiple cropping and raised swine, sheep, goats, and cattle; they also caught fish, shellfish, and crabs.

However, Dhiʾban appears to have declined in importance after 1356, when the nearby town of Hisban lost its status as capital of the al-Balqa region in favour of Amman. Periods of drought in the ensuing years exacerbated this decline, and Dhiʾban was abandoned during the early years of the Ottoman Empire.

=== Late Islamic and Hashemite Periods ===
The Ottoman defter for the Transjordan region of Ottoman Syria from 1538 to 1596 neglected Dhiʾban, which implies that the settlement declined through the 16th century. Families of the Bani Hamida, a bedouin tribe, settled the site of Dhiʾban in the 1950s, building upon preexisting structures as well as using them for raw materials. In the following years, the land surrounding the tell was distributed to the community for private ownership, and the tell itself remains Jordanian government property.

== Archaeology ==
The first archaeological work at tell Dhiʾban was conducted by Duncan Mackenzie in 1910, mainly a surface examination. Scientific excavations began at the site in the mid-20th century with the American Schools of Oriental Research's project in 1950–1953 (now the American Society of Overseas Research), led by Frederick Victor Winnett, and later by William LaForest Reed. The ASOR effort, now led by William Morton, continued with seasons in 1955, 1956, and 1965.

The current excavation and restoration project is the Dhiban Excavation and Development Project codirected by scholars at the University of Liverpool, Knox College, IL, and the University of California, Berkeley. Work has been conducted there since 2004; As of 2025, a dig programme was scheduled to begin on May 17, 2025.

== See also ==
- Alia Club
- Cities of the ancient Near East
- Isaiah 15
- Mesha Stele
