= Moabite language =

Ancient Semitic language of Moab (Jordan)

Moabite
- Region: Formerly spoken in northwestern Jordan
- Era: early half of 1st millennium BC
- Language family: Afro-Asiatic: Semitic; West; Central; Northwest; Canaanite; South; Moabite
- Writing system: Phoenician alphabet

Language codes
- ISO 639-3: obm
- Glottolog: moab1234

The Moabite language, also known as the Moabite dialect, is an extinct sub-language or dialect of the Canaanite languages, themselves a branch of Northwest Semitic languages, formerly spoken in the region described in the Bible as Moab (modern day central-western Jordan) in the early 1st millennium BC.

The body of Canaanite epigraphy found in the region is described as Moabite; this is a very small corpus limited primarily to the Mesha Stele and a few seals.

Moabite, together with the similarly poorly attested Ammonite and Edomite, belonged to the dialect continuum of the Canaanite group of northwest Semitic languages, together with Hebrew and Phoenician.

== History ==
An altar inscription written in Moabite and dated to 800 BC was revealed in an excavation in Khirbat Ataruz. It was written using a variant of the Phoenician alphabet. Most knowledge about Moabite comes from the Mesha Stele, which is the only known extensive text in the language. In addition, there is the three-line El-Kerak Inscription and a few seals. The inscription on Mesha Stele is also referred to as “Kanaanäische und Aramäische Inschriften” (KAI), which is German for “Canaanite and Aramaic Inscriptions.” It is read from right to left.

== Grammar ==
The main features distinguishing Moabite from fellow Canaanite languages such as Hebrew and Phoenician are: a plural in -în rather than -îm (e.g. mlkn "kings" for Biblical Hebrew məlākîm), like Aramaic (also Northwest Semitic) and Arabic (Central Semitic); retention of the feminine ending -at or "-ah", which Biblical Hebrew reduces to -āh only (e.g. qiryat or qiryah, "town", Biblical Hebrew qiryāh) but retains in the construct state nominal form (e.g. qiryát yisrael "town of Israel"); and retention of a verb form with infixed -t-, also found in Arabic and Akkadian (w-’ltḥm "I began to fight", from the root lḥm). Vowel values and diphthongs, which had potential to vary wildly between Semitic languages, were also largely typical of other Semitic tongues: there is inconsistent evidence to suggest that ā shifted to ō much like in Hebrew and later Phoenician, at the same time, there is evidence to suggest that the diphthongs /aw/ and /ay/ eventually contracted to ō and ē, another characteristic shared by Hebrew and later Phoenician. Moabite differed only dialectally from Hebrew, and Moabite religion and culture was related to that of the Israelites. On the other hand, although Moabite itself had begun to diverge, the script used in the 9th century BC did not differ from the script used in Hebrew inscriptions at that time.

=== Arrows ===
In numbered examples, non-Roman script representations are signaled by arrows, namely ⟶ or ⟵, to indicate the text's direction of writing as it is presented in the volume. As for Ugaritic, Hebrew (epigraphic and Tiberian), Phoenician, and Moabite, the arrow will typically point in the same direction as the original writing.

=== Numerals ===
The absolute numeral precedes singular (collective) nouns, for instance “thirty years” is expressed as “šlšn.št” in line 2 of KAI; it has been transliterated as well as translated by Alvierra Niccani. Others are followed by a plural noun. Numeral phrases can stand in apposition with a noun (phrase) coming before or after. This is seen in KAI's line 17: “ymh.wḥṣy.ymy.bnh.’rb’nšt,” meaning, “his days and half the days of his son, for forty years.”

== Controversy ==
=== Sentence boundaries ===
In the inscriptions on the Mesha Stele a vertical stroke, /, appears 37 times. However, its function is the subject of disagreement among researchers. Van Zyl claims that the strokes are used to divide clauses. Similarly, Segert explains that they can be seen as tools for the punctuation of sentences. A. Poebel offers a different explanation and states that vertical strokes are used to separate sentences forming a mentally cohesive group. According to Andersen the only two parallels that can be found in accordance with the stroke are in the Gezer Calendar. Rather, he suggest that a dot fulfills the function as a word divider based on its occurrence in a variety of Old Aramaic inscriptions, the Siloam Inscription and other texts of the early Hebrew.

=== Classification as Canaanite dialects ===
The geography of the dialects of the Levant has been revised the past few years. Dialects of Canaanite, including Moabite, show differences from one another.

==== Isogloss ====
A lexical isogloss exists between the Northwest Semitic languages Aramaic, Hebrew and Moabite. For example, the verb 'to be', from the root(s) *HWY/HYY. The coastal languages, Phoenician and Ugaritic, both used the root *KWN, and that seems to be the case in the mother tongue of the Amarna scribes from Canaan as well; and it is also standard in Arabic.

==== Syntactic features ====
A syntactic feature that Aramaic, Hebrew and Moabite share is the syntagma of the narrative preterit. Supported by three inscriptions, prefix preterite narrative sequences are found in Moabite as well as Old Southern Aramaic and Hebrew. First, it was discerned in the Old Aramaic inscription of Zakkur by king of Hamath and proclaimed to be of Canaanite influence on an Aramaic text. Second, it occurred in the Deir Alla Inscription. Finally the prefix preterite, appeared in the Tel Dan stele with and without the sequential conjunction. This feature is absent in Phoenician, a language that is certain to be Canaanite.

== Sample text ==
The following table presents the first four lines of the inscription of Mesha Stele including its transliteration and English translation by Alviero Niccacci.

Line Number	Line Inscription	Transliteration	Translation
1	𐤀𐤍𐤊 𐤟 𐤌𐤔𐤏 𐤟 𐤁𐤍 𐤟 𐤊𐤌𐤔 ? ? 𐤌𐤋𐤊 𐤟 𐤌𐤀𐤁 𐤟 𐤄𐤃	ʾnk.mšʿ.bn.kmš(...).mlk.mʾb.hd-	I am Mesha, son of Kemosh(x), king of Moab, the Di-
2	𐤉𐤁𐤍𐤉 | 𐤀𐤁𐤉 𐤟 𐤌𐤋𐤊 𐤟 𐤏𐤋 𐤟 𐤌𐤀𐤁 𐤟 𐤔𐤋𐤔𐤍 𐤟 𐤔𐤕 𐤟 𐤅𐤀𐤍𐤊 𐤟 𐤌𐤋𐤊	-ybny.ʾby.mlk.ʿl.mʾb.šlšn.št.wʾnk.mlk-	-bonite. My father ruled over Moab for thirty years, and I rul-
3	[𐤕𐤉 𐤟 𐤀𐤇𐤓 𐤟 𐤀𐤁𐤉 | 𐤅𐤀𐤏𐤔 𐤟 𐤄𐤁𐤌𐤕 𐤟 𐤆𐤀𐤕 𐤟 𐤋𐤊𐤌𐤔 𐤟 𐤁𐤒𐤓𐤇𐤄 | 𐤁[𐤌𐤎 𐤟 𐤉	-ty.ʾhr.ʾb / wʾ.ʿś.hbmt.zʾt.lkmš.bqrḥh / bm(tʾ.y-)	-ed after my father. I made this high place for Kemosh in Qerihoh. [A] high pl(ace of salv-)
4	...𐤔𐤏 𐤟 𐤊𐤉 𐤟 𐤄𐤔𐤏𐤍𐤉 𐤟 𐤌𐤊𐤋 𐤟 𐤄𐤔𐤋𐤊𐤍	-šʿ.ky.hšʿny.mkl.hšʿlkn...	-ation because he saved me from all predators...
