= Schrader (disambiguation) =

Schrader may refer to:

- Schrader, family name
- Schrader, West Virginia
- Schrader Creek, Pennsylvania, United States
- Schrader Range, a mountain range in Papua New Guinea
- Pic Schrader, a mountain in the Pyrenees
- Hank Schrader, fictional character in the American television drama series Breaking Bad, portrayed by Dean Norris
- Schrader valve, a valve for controlling air in automobile and bicycle tires
