= Salmanu =

King of Moab

Salmanu was king of Moab during the reign of the Assyrian king Tiglath-Pileser III (ruled 745–727 BCE). He is mentioned in a clay inscription found in Nimrud as a vassal of Assyria. Eberhard Schrader theorized that he might be identical with the Shalman who waged war on Israel and sacked Beth-arbel (Hosea 10:14); though other scholars identify Shalman with one of the Assyrian kings named Shalmaneser.
