= Shalman (Bible) =

King that is mentioned in Hosea 10:14

Shalman (Hebrew: שַׁלְמַן Šalman) is an individual, presumably a king, that is mentioned in Hosea 10:14 as having sacked the city of Beth-Arbel. He is usually identified with the Assyrian kings Shalmaneser II (by Archibald Sayce) or IV (by François Lenormant).

Eberhard Schrader argued that rather than Shalmaneser, Shalman was probably Salmanu, a king of Moab mentioned in an inscription of Tiglath-Pileser III.
