= Schrader =

Schrader is a family name that is very common roughly within the Triangle Hannover-Hamburg-Berlin within Germany (so-called "Eastfalia", part of today's states of Lower Saxony and Saxony-Anhalt). It means tailor. Notable people with the surname include:

- August Schrader (1807–1894), German-American inventor of "Schrader valve" for bicycle and auto tires
- Ben Schrader (1964–2024), New Zealand urban historian
- Bernhard Schrader (1931–2012), German chemist, pioneer of Raman spectroscopy
- Bertha Schrader (1845–1920), German painter, lithographer, and woodblock print-maker
- Carl Voss-Schrader (1880–1955), Finnish colonel, business director, lawyer and short-term interior minister
- Christian Schrader, American sound engineer
- Clement Schrader (1820–1875), German Jesuit theologian
- David Schrader (born 1952), American harpsichordist, organist, and fortepianist
- Dicken Schrader (born 1973), Colombian-American video artist
- Eberhard Schrader (1836–1908), German orientalist
- Ed Schrader, American academic and university administrator
- Friedrich Schrader (1865–1922), German-Ottoman translator, orientalist and writer
- Gerhard Schrader (1903–1990), German chemist
- Gus Schrader (1895–1941), American racecar driver
- Heinrich Schrader (botanist) (1767–1836), German botanist
- Heinrich Schrader (sportsman) (1893–1980), Australian footballer and cricketer
- Hermann T. Schrader (1860–1934), Australian pianist, violinist and cellist
- Hilde Schrader (1910–1966), German swimmer
- Jim Schrader (1932–1972), American football player
- Julius Schrader (1815–1900), German painter
- Ken Schrader (born 1955), American racecar driver
- Kurt Schrader (born 1951), American politician
- Leo Schrader (1938–2011), American politician from Missouri
- Leonard Schrader (1943–2006), American screenwriter and director
- Libbie Schrader, American musician
- Maria Schrader (born 1965), German actress
- Niklas Schrader (born 1981), German politician
- Otto Schrader (philologist) (1855–1919), German philologist
- Otto von Schrader (1888–1945), German naval officer
- Paul Schrader (born 1946), American film director
- Robert Schrader (1939–2015), German theoretical and mathematical physicist
- Spencer Shrader (born 1999), American football player
- Warren Schrader (1921–2009), New Zealand flying ace of the Second World War

== Fictional ==
- Hank Schrader, DEA agent in TV series Breaking Bad
- Marie Schrader, wife of Hank in TV series Breaking Bad
