= Palestine (region) =

Geographic area in West Asia

Coordinates: 31°N 35°E

Palestine Παλαιστίνη (Ancient Greek) Palaestina (Latin) فِلَسْطِين (Arabic) פָּלֶשְׂתִּינָה (Hebrew) (Note: The term פָּלֶשְׂתִּינָה Pāleśtīnā is sometimes used in secular historical contexts to refer to the land when it was under European (chiefly Roman and especially British) control. The term פָלַסְטִין Fālasṭīn is used after 1948 in the context of Arab national aspirations in Palestine, and nowadays chiefly refers to the State of Palestine. Similarly to Pāleśtīnā, it may be used in secular historiographical context to refer to the land during periods of Arab and/or Muslim rule, but this is rare.) (Note: אֶרֶץ יִשְׂרָאֵל ʾEreṣ Yiśrāʾēl ("Land of Israel"), sometimes called simply הָאָרֶץ hāʾĀreṣ ("the Land") or abbreviated א״י, is the most common Hebrew name for Palestine as a geographic region.)
- Boundaries of the Roman province Syria Palaestina, where dashed green line shows the boundary between Byzantine Palaestina Prima (later Jund Filastin) and Palaestina Secunda (later Jund al-Urdunn), as well as Palaestina Salutaris (later Jebel et-Tih and the Jifar) Borders of Mandatory Palestine Borders between Israel and Palestine (West Bank and Gaza Strip) which largely follow the Green Line
- Largest city: Jerusalem
- Languages: Arabic, Hebrew
- Ethnic groups: Arabs, Jews, Samaritans
- Countries: Israel; Palestine; Jordan (Note: Northwestern parts, according to some definitions.)

Palestine, (Note: Ancient Greek: Παλαιστίνη, romanized: Palaistínē; Latin: Palaestina; Arabic: فِلَسْطِين, romanized: Filasṭīn; Levantine Arabic: فَلَسْطِين, romanized: Falasṭīn, or فِلِسْطِين, Filisṭīn; Hebrew: פָּלֶשְׂתִּינָה, romanized: Pāleśtīnā) also known as historic Palestine or land of Palestine, is a geographical region in West Asia. It generally encompasses the area inhabited by the modern states of Israel and Palestine, though over history it has also been used to refer to an area both smaller and larger. Other names for part or all of this region include Canaan, the Promised Land, the Land of Israel, the Holy Land, and Judea.

The earliest written record referring to Palestine as a geographical region is in the Histories of Herodotus in the 5th century BCE, which calls the area Palaistine, referring to the territory previously held by Philistia, a confederation of city states that existed in that area from the 12th to the 7th century BCE. The Roman Empire conquered the region in 63 BCE and appointed client kings to rule over it until Rome began directly ruling over the region and established a predominately-Jewish province named "Judaea" in 6 CE. The Roman Empire killed the vast majority of Jews in Judaea to suppress the Bar Kokhba revolt during 132–136 CE; shortly after the revolt, the Romans expelled and enslaved nearly all of the remaining Jews in the historical Judah region centered on Jerusalem, depopulating that area. Roman authorities renamed the province of Judaea to "Syria Palaestina" in c. 135 CE to punish Jews for the Bar Kokhba Revolt and permanently sever ties between Jews and the province. In 390, during the Byzantine period, the region was split into the provinces of Palaestina Prima, Palaestina Secunda, and Palaestina Salutaris. Following the Muslim conquest of the Levant in the 630s, the military district of Jund Filastin was established. While Palestine's boundaries have changed throughout history, it has generally comprised the southern portion of the wider Syria or Levant region.

As the birthplace of Judaism and Christianity, Palestine has been a crossroads for religion, culture, commerce, and politics. In the Bronze Age, it was home to Canaanite city-states; and the later Iron Age saw the emergence of Israel and Judah. It has since come under the sway of various empires, including the Neo-Assyrian, the Neo-Babylonian, the Achaemenid Persian, the Macedonian (of Alexander the Great), and the Ptolemaic and Seleucid empires. The briefly independent Hasmonean kingdom of Judea came under Roman hegemony in 63 BCE and was eventually annexed as a Roman province. Under subsequent Byzantine rule, the region, by then renamed Palaestina, became a major center of Christianity. In the 7th century, Palestine was conquered by the Muslim Rashidun Caliphate, ending Byzantine rule in the region; Rashidun rule was succeeded by the Umayyad, Abbasid, and Fatimid caliphates. Following the collapse of the Kingdom of Jerusalem, which had been established through the Crusades, the population of Palestine became predominantly Muslim. In the 13th century, it became part of the Mamluk Sultanate, and after 1516, spent four centuries as part of the Ottoman Empire.

During World War I, Palestine was occupied by the United Kingdom as part of the Sinai and Palestine campaign. Between 1919 and 1922, the League of Nations created the Mandate for Palestine, which came under British administration as Mandatory Palestine through the 1940s. Tensions between Jews and Arabs escalated into the 1947–1949 Palestine war, which ended with the establishment of Israel on most of the territory, and neighboring Jordan and Egypt controlling the West Bank and the Gaza Strip, respectively. The 1967 Six-Day War saw Israel's occupation of both territories, which has been among the core issues of the ongoing Israeli–Palestinian conflict.

== Etymology ==
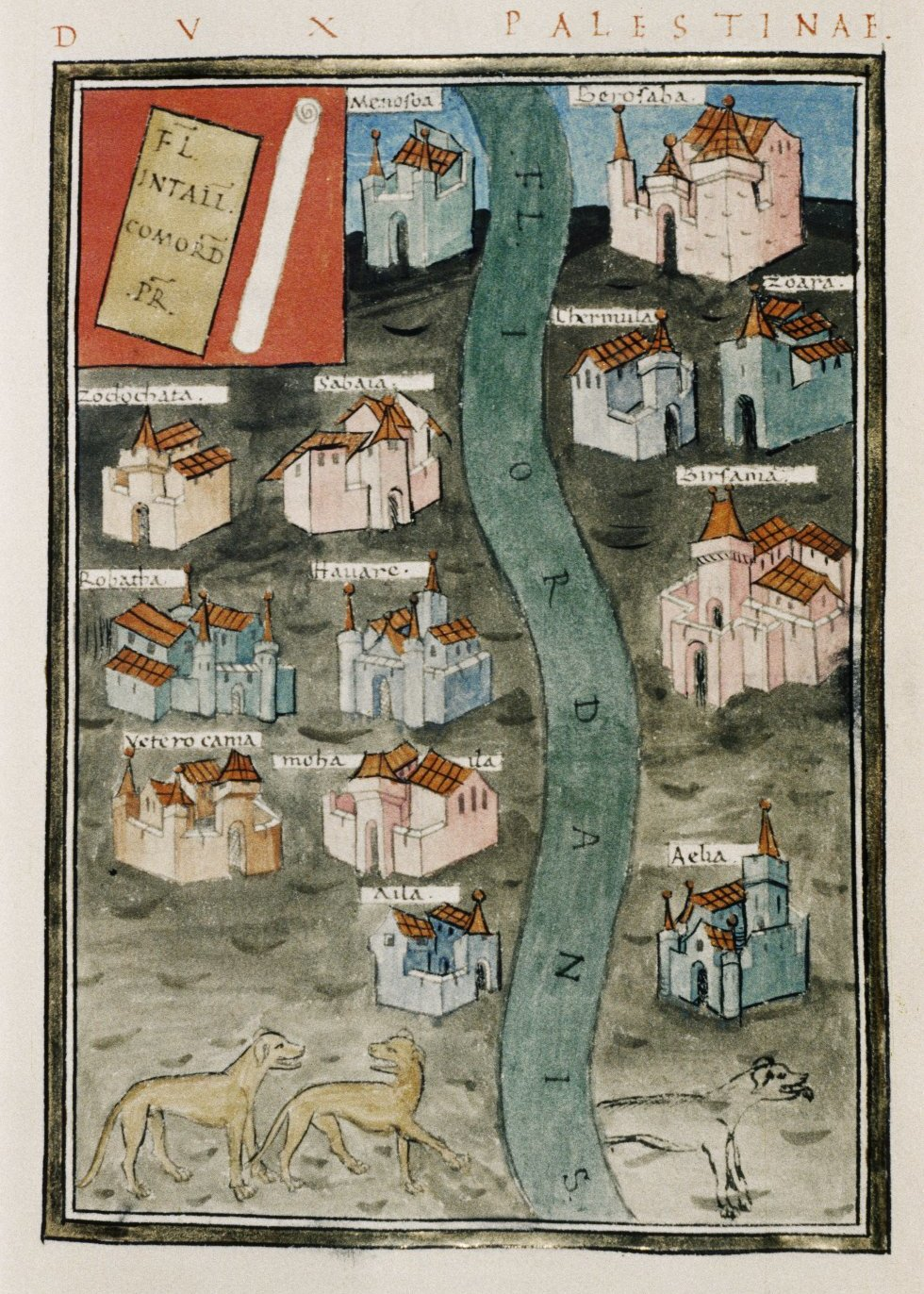
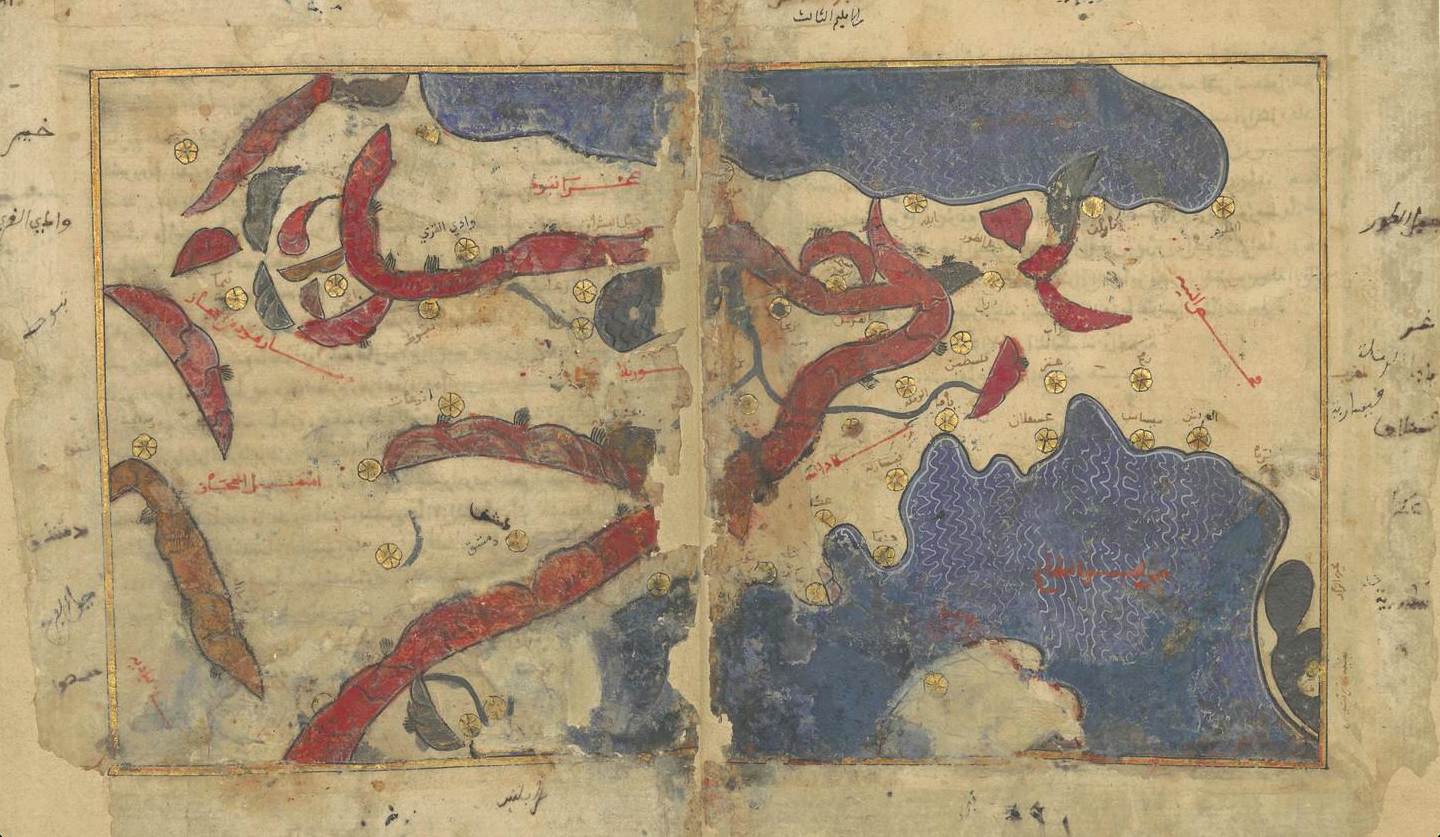
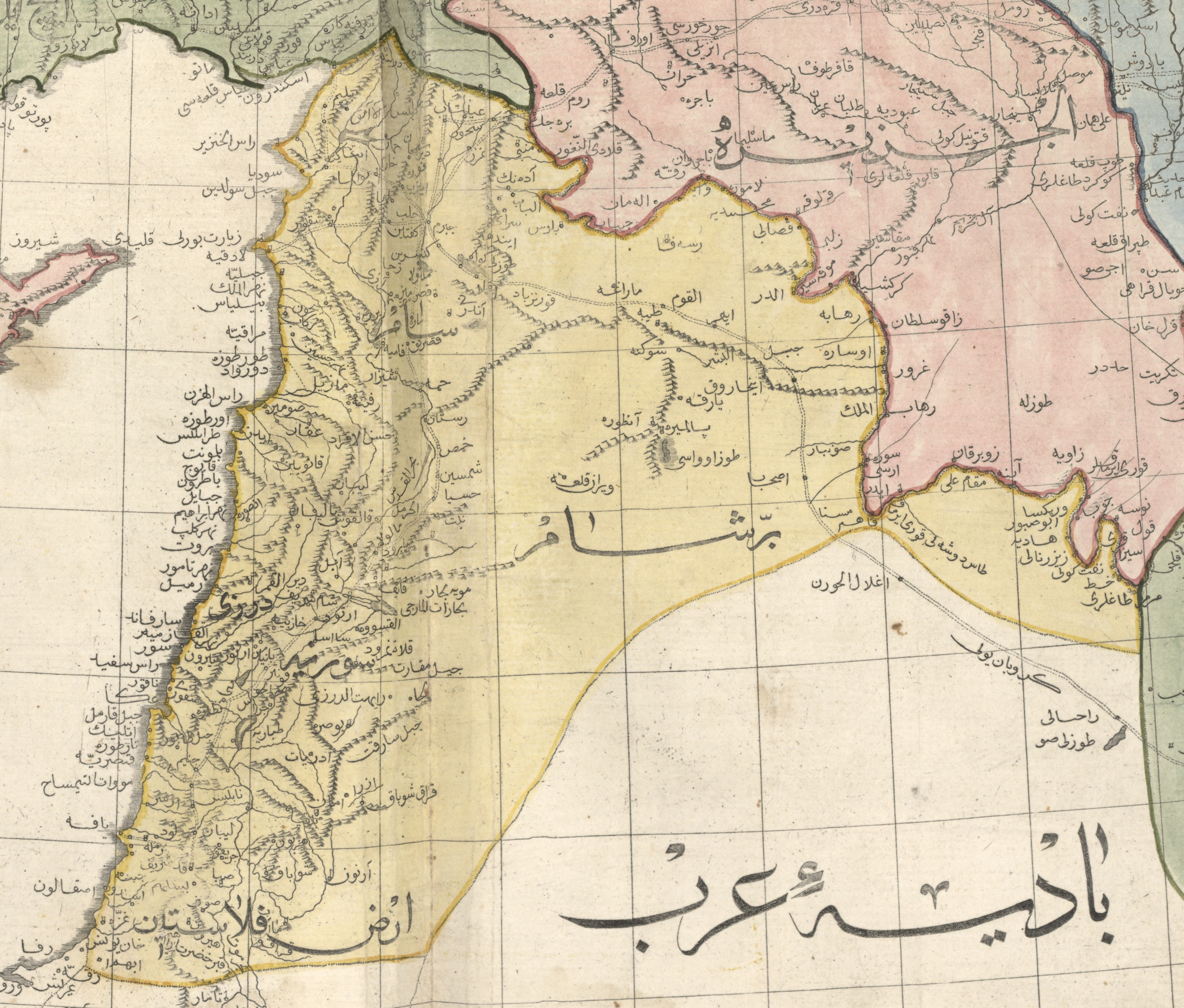
The name is found throughout recorded history. Examples of historical maps of the region that contain the name Palestine are shown above: (1) Pomponius Mela (Latin, c. 43 CE); (2) Notitia Dignitatum (Latin, c. 410 CE); (3) Tabula Rogeriana (Arabic, 1154 CE); (4) Cedid Atlas (Ottoman Turkish, 1803 CE)

Modern archaeology has identified 12 ancient inscriptions from Egyptian and Assyrian records recording likely cognates of Hebrew Pelesheth. The term "Peleset" (transliterated from hieroglyphs as P-r-s-t) is found in five inscriptions referring to a neighboring people or land starting from c. 1150 BCE during the Twentieth dynasty of Egypt. The first known mention is at the temple at Medinet Habu which refers to the Peleset among those who fought with Egypt in Ramesses III's reign, and the last known is 300 years later on Padiiset's Statue. Seven known Assyrian inscriptions refer to the region of "Palashtu" or "Pilistu", beginning with Adad-nirari III in the Nimrud Slab in c. 800 BCE through to a treaty made by Esarhaddon more than a century later. Neither the Egyptian nor the Assyrian sources provided clear regional boundaries for the term. (Note: Eberhard Schrader wrote in his seminal "Keilinschriften und Geschichtsforschung" ("KGF", in English "Cuneiform inscriptions and Historical Research") that the Assyrian tern "Palashtu" or "Pilistu" referred to the wider Palestine or "the East" in general, instead of "Philistia" (Schrader 1878, pp. 123–124; Anspacher 1912, p. 48).)

The first clear use of the term Palestine to refer to the entire area between Phoenicia and Egypt was in 5th century BCE ancient Greece, (Note: "The earliest occurrence of this name in a Greek text is in the mid-fifth century B.C., Histories of Herodotus, where it is applied to the area of the Levant between Phoenicia and Egypt." ... "The first known occurrence of the Greek word Palaistine is in the Histories of Herodotus, written near the mid-fifth century B.C. Palaistine Syria, or simply Palaistine, is applied to what may be identified as the southern part of Syria, comprising the region between Phoenicia and Egypt. Although some of Herodotus' references to Palestine are compatible with a narrow definition of the coastal strip of the Land of Israel, it is clear that Herodotus does call the whole land by the name of the coastal strip." ... "It is believed that Herodotus visited Palestine in the fifth decade of the fifth century B.C." ..."In the earliest Classical literature references to Palestine generally applied to the Land of Israel in the wider sense." (Jacobson 1999)) (Note: "As early as the Histories of Herodotus, written in the second half of the fifth century BCE, the term Palaistinê is used to describe not just the geographical area where the Philistines lived, but the entire area between Phoenicia and Egypt—in other words, the Land of Israel. Herodotus, who had traveled through the area, would have had firsthand knowledge of the land and its people. Yet he used Palaistinê to refer not to the Land of the Philistines, but to the Land of Israel" (Jacobson 2001)) when Herodotus wrote in The Histories of a "district of Syria, called Palaistínē" (Ancient Greek: Συρίη ἡ Παλαιστίνη καλεομένη), which included the Judean mountains and the Jordan Rift Valley. (Note: In The Histories, Herodotus referred to the practice of male circumcision associated with the Hebrew people: "the Colchians, the Egyptians, and the Ethiopians, are the only nations who have practised circumcision from the earliest times. The Phoenicians and the Syrians of Palestine themselves confess that they learnt the custom of the Egyptians ... Now these are the only nations who use circumcision." (Herodotus 1858, pp. Bk ii, Ch 104)) Approximately a century later, Aristotle used a similar definition for the region in Meteorology, in which he included the Dead Sea. Later Greek writers such as Polemon and Pausanias also used the term to refer to the same region, which was followed by Roman writers such as Ovid, Tibullus, Pomponius Mela, Pliny the Elder, Dio Chrysostom, Statius, Plutarch as well as Romano-Jewish writers Philo of Alexandria and Josephus.

Many classical-era sources referred to the inland region inhabited by Jews as Judea, distinguishing it from the Philistine coastal area. The Roman Empire conquered the region and in 6 CE established a predominately-Jewish province named "Judaea." The Roman Empire killed the vast majority of Jews in Judaea to suppress the Bar Kokhba Revolt during 132-136 CE; shortly after the revolt, the Romans expelled and enslaved nearly all of the remaining Jews in Judaea, depopulating the region. Roman authorities renamed the province of Judaea to "Syria Palaestina" in c. 135 CE to punish Jews for the Bar Kokhba Revolt and permanently sever ties between Jews and the province. This was the only case where the Roman Empire renamed a province specifically in response to a rebellion. There is circumstantial evidence linking Hadrian with the name change, but the precise date is not certain.

Palestina or Palestine is generally accepted to be a cognate of the biblical name Peleshet (פלשת Pəlésheth, usually transliterated as Philistia). The term and its derivates are used more than 250 times in Masoretic-derived versions of the Hebrew Bible, of which 10 uses are in the Torah, with undefined boundaries, and almost 200 of the remaining references are in the Book of Judges and the Books of Samuel. The term is rarely used in the Septuagint, which used a transliteration Land of Phylistieim (Γῆ τῶν Φυλιστιείμ), different from the contemporary Greek place name Palaistínē (Παλαιστίνη). It is also theorized to be the portmanteau of the Greek word for the Philistines and palaistês, which means "wrestler/rival/adversary". This aligns with the Greek practice of punning place names, since the latter is part of the etymological meaning for Israel.

The Septuagint instead used the term "allophuloi" (άλλόφυλοι, "other nations") throughout the Books of Judges and Samuel, such that the term "Philistines" has been interpreted to mean "non-Israelites of the Promised Land" when used in the context of Samson, Saul and David, and Rabbinic sources explain that these peoples were different from the Philistines of the Book of Genesis. (Note: "Rabbinic sources insist that the Philistines of Judges and Samuel were different people altogether from the Philistines of Genesis. (Midrash Tehillim on Psalm 60 (Braude: vol. 1, 513); the issue here is precisely whether Israel should have been obliged, later, to keep the Genesis treaty.) This parallels a shift in the Septuagint's translation of Hebrew pelistim. Before Judges, it uses the neutral transliteration phulistiim, but beginning with Judges it switches to the pejorative allophuloi. [To be precise, Codex Alexandrinus starts using the new translation at the beginning of Judges and uses it invariably thereafter, Vaticanus likewise switches at the beginning of Judges, but reverts to phulistiim on six occasions later in Judges, the last of which is 14:2.]" (Jobling & Rose 1996, p. 404))

During the Byzantine period, the region of Palestine within Syria Palaestina was subdivided into Palaestina Prima and Secunda, and an area of land including the Negev and Sinai became Palaestina Salutaris. Following the Muslim conquest, place names that were in use by the Byzantine administration generally continued to be used in Arabic. The use of the name "Palestine" became common in Early Modern English, was used in English and Arabic during the Mutasarrifate of Jerusalem (Note: For example, the 1915 Filastin Risalesi ("Palestine Document"), an Ottoman army (VIII Corps) country survey which formally identified Palestine as including the sanjaqs of Akka (the Galilee), the Sanjaq of Nablus, and the Sanjaq of Jerusalem (Kudus Sherif)) and was revived as an official place name with the British Mandate for Palestine.

Some other terms that have been used to refer to all or part of this land include Canaan, Land of Israel (Eretz Yisrael or Ha'aretz), (Note: The New Testament, taking up a term used once in the Tanakh (1 Samuel 13:19), speaks of a larger theologically-defined area, of which Palestine is a part, as the "land of Israel" (γῆ Ἰσραήλ) (Matthew 2:20–21), in a narrative paralleling that of the Book of Exodus.) (Note: "The parallels between this narrative and that of Exodus continue to be drawn. Like Pharaoh before him, Herod, having been frustrated in his original efforts, now seeks to achieve his objectives by implementing a program of infanticide. As a result, here – as in Exodus – rescuing the hero's life from the clutches of the evil king necessitates a sudden flight to another country. And finally, in perhaps the most vivid parallel of all, the present narrative uses virtually the same words of the earlier one to provide the information that the coast is clear for the herds safe return: here, in Matthew 2:20, 'go [back]… for those who sought the child's life are dead; there, in Exodus 4:19, go back… for all the men who sought your life are dead'" (Goldberg 2001, p. 147).) the Promised Land, the region of Syria, the Holy Land, Iudaea Province, Judea, Coele-Syria, (Note: Other writers, such as Strabo, referred to the region as Coele-Syria ("all Syria") around 10–20 CE .) "Israel HaShlema", Kingdom of Israel, Kingdom of Jerusalem, Zion, Retenu (Ancient Egyptian), Southern Syria, Southern Levant and Syria Palaestina.

== History ==
=== Overview ===
Situated at a strategic location between Egypt, Syria and Arabia, and the birthplace of Judaism and Christianity, the region has a long and tumultuous history as a crossroads for religion, culture, commerce, and politics. The region has been controlled by numerous peoples, including ancient Egyptians, Canaanites, Israelites, Assyrians, Babylonians, Achaemenids, ancient Greeks, Romans, Parthians, Sasanians, Byzantines, the Arab Rashidun, Umayyad, Abbasid and Fatimid caliphates, Crusaders, Ayyubids, Mamluks, Mongols, Ottomans, the British, and modern Israelis and Palestinians.

=== Ancient period ===
Philistia in the broader Ancient Near East context at around 1000 BCE

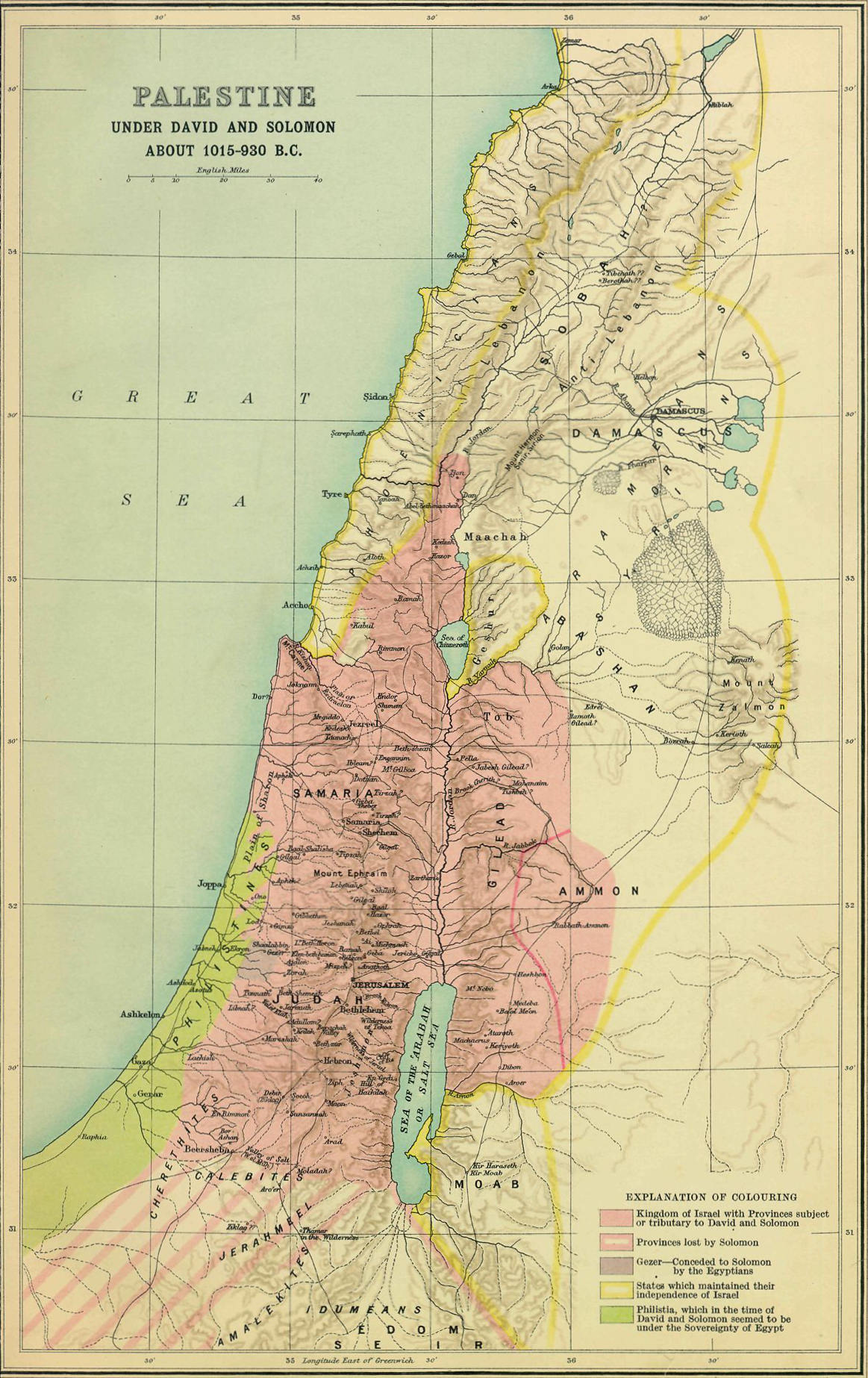
This map from The Historical Geography of the Holy Land, showing "Palestine under David and Solomon about 1015 - 930 BC" was used at the Paris Peace Conference (1919–1920) during negotiations over the boundaries of the Mandate for Palestine.

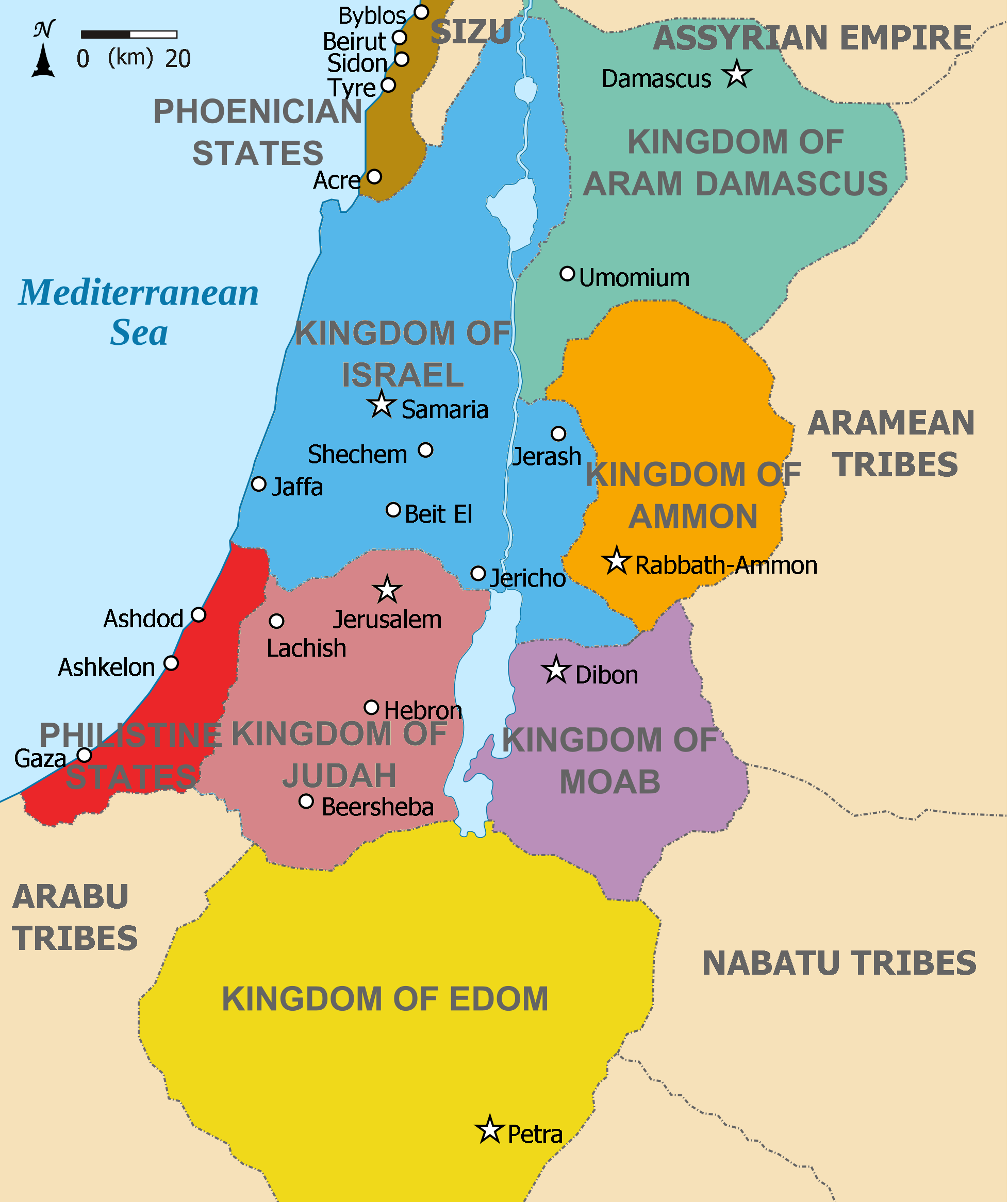
Kingdoms of the Southern Levant during the Iron Age (c. 830 BCE)

The region was among the earliest in the world to see human habitation, agricultural communities and civilization. In the late 4th millennium BCE, during the Early Bronze Age, there were areas of permanent Egyptian settlement in the southern Levant; land beyond these areas was inhabited by the Egyptians seasonally. The area of permanent settlement included Tell es-Sakan on the Mediterranean coast, which is the oldest known fortified Egyptian settlement and was likely the administrative centre of the region. During the Bronze Age, independent Canaanite city-states were established, and were influenced by the surrounding civilizations of ancient Egypt, Mesopotamia, Phoenicia, Minoan Crete, and Syria. Between 1550 and 1400 BCE, the Canaanite cities became vassals to the Egyptian New Kingdom who held power until the 1178 BCE Battle of Djahy (Canaan) during the wider Bronze Age collapse.

Three cities listed in the Egyptian Onomasticon of Amenope (c. 1100 BCE) - Gaza, Isdud (Ashdod) and Asqalan - are mentioned in association with a people named as Peleshet (Philistines). This is the first indication for the emergence of the Philistine pentapolis, five city-states each ruled by a king, and that for some 550 years, exercised some independence, even when subjected to overarching and alternating Egyptian or Assyrian imperial rule.

It is theorized that Israelites emerged from a dramatic social transformation that took place in the people of the central hill country of Canaan around 1200 BCE, with no signs of violent invasion or even of peaceful infiltration of a clearly defined ethnic group from elsewhere. (Note: "Several scholars hold the revisionist thesis that the Israelites did not move to the area as a distinct and foreign ethnic group at all, bringing with them their god Yahwe and forcibly evicting the indigenous population, but that they gradually evolved out of an amalgam of several ethnic groups, and that the Israelite cult developed on "Palestinian" soil amid the indigenous population. This would make the Israelites "Palestinians" not just in geographical and political terms (under the British Mandate, both Jews and Arabs living in the country were defined as Palestinians), but in ethnic and broader cultural terms as well. While this does not conform to the conventional view, or to the understanding of most Jews (and Arabs, for that matter), it is not easy to either prove or disprove. For although the Bible speaks at length about how the Israelites "took" the land, it is not a history book to draw reliable maps from. There is nothing in the extra-biblical sources, including the extensive Egyptian materials, to document the sojourn in Egypt or the exodus so vividly described in the Bible (and commonly dated to the thirteenth century). Biblical scholar Moshe Weinfeld sees the biblical account of the exodus, and of Moses and Joshua as founding heroes of the "national narration", as a later rendering of a lived experience that was subsequently either "forgotten" or consciously repressed – a textbook case of the "invented tradition" so familiar to modern students of ethnicity and nationalism." (Krämer 2011, p. 8)) During the Iron Age, two related kingdoms, Israel and Judah emerge. The Kingdom of Israel emerged as an important local power by the 10th century BCE before falling to the Neo-Assyrian Empire in 722 BCE. Israel's southern neighbor, the Kingdom of Judah, emerged in the 8th or 9th century BCE and later became a client state of first the Neo-Assyrian and then the Neo-Babylonian Empire before a revolt against the latter led to its destruction in 586 BCE.

The region of Palestine as a whole became part of the Neo-Assyrian Empire from c. 740 BCE which was itself replaced by the Neo-Babylonian Empire in c. 627 BCE. In 587/6 BCE, Jerusalem was besieged and destroyed by the second Babylonian king, Nebuchadnezzar II, (Note: (Temple of Jerusalem): totally destroyed the building in 587/586) who subsequently exiled the Judeans to Babylon. The Kingdom of Judah was then annexed as a Babylonian province. The Philistines were also exiled. The defeat of Judah was recorded by the Babylonians.

In 539 BCE, the Babylonian empire was conquered by the Achaemenid Empire. According to the Hebrew Bible and implications from the Cyrus Cylinder, the exiled Jews were eventually allowed to return to Jerusalem. The returned population in Judah were allowed to self-rule under Persian governance, and some parts of the fallen kingdom became a Persian province known as Yehud. Except Yehud, at least another four Persian provinces existed in the region: Samaria, Gaza, Ashdod, and Ascalon, in addition to the Phoenician city states in the north and the Arabian tribes in the south. During the same period, the Edomites migrated from Transjordan to the southern parts of Judea, which became known as Idumaea. The Qedarites were the dominant Arab tribe; their territory ran from the Hejaz in the south to the Negev in the north through the period of Persian and Hellenistic dominion.

=== Classical antiquity ===
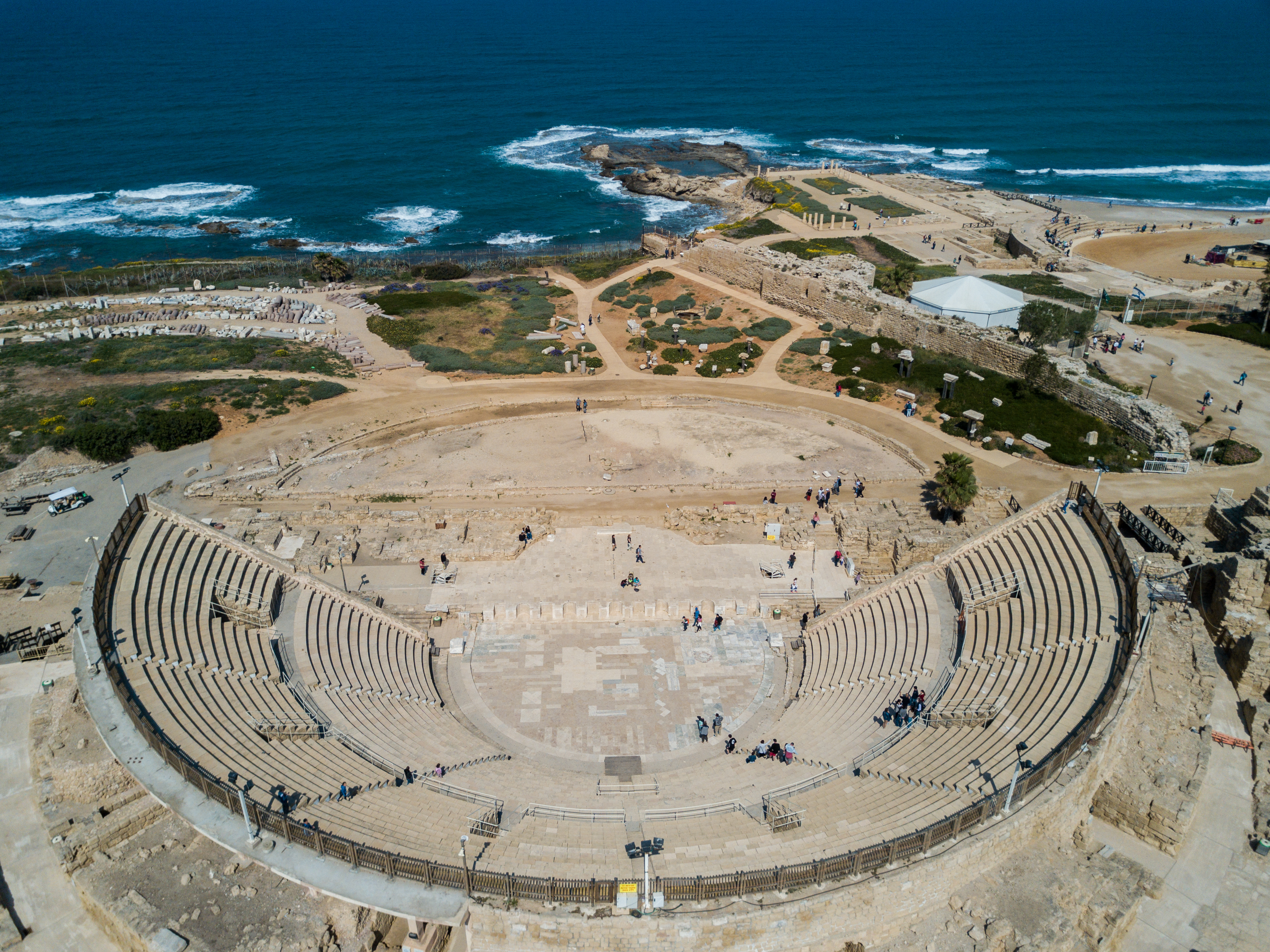
Caesarea Maritima, also known as Caesarea Palestinae, built under Herod the Great at the site of a former Phoenician naval station, became the capital city of Roman Judea, Roman Syria Palaestina and Byzantine Palaestina Prima provinces.

In the 330s BCE, Macedonian ruler Alexander the Great conquered the region, which changed hands several times during the wars of the Diadochi and later Syrian Wars. It ultimately fell to the Seleucid Empire between 219 and 200 BCE. During that period, the region became heavily hellenized, building tensions between Greeks and locals.

In 167 BCE, the Maccabean Revolt erupted, leading to the establishment of an independent Hasmonean Kingdom in Judea. From 110 BCE, the Hasmoneans extended their authority over much of Palestine, including Samaria, Galilee, Iturea, Perea, and Idumea. The Jewish control over the wider region resulted in it also becoming known as Judaea, a term that had previously only referred to the smaller region of the Judaean Mountains. (Note: "In both the Idumaean and the Ituraean alliances, and in the annexation of Samaria, the Judaeans had taken the leading role. They retained it. The whole political–military–religious league that now united the hill country of Palestine from Dan to Beersheba, whatever it called itself, was directed by, and soon came to be called by others, 'the Ioudaioi'" (Smith 1999, p. 210a)) During the same period, the Edomites fully assimilated.

Between 73 and 63 BCE, the Roman Republic extended its influence into the region in the Third Mithridatic War. Pompey conquered Judea in 63 BCE, splitting the former Hasmonean Kingdom into five districts. In around 40 BCE, the Parthians conquered Palestine, deposed the Roman ally Hyrcanus II, and installed a puppet ruler of the Hasmonean line known as Antigonus II. By 37 BCE, the Parthians withdrew from Palestine.

Palestine is generally considered the "Cradle of Christianity". Christianity, a religion based on the life and teachings of Jesus of Nazareth, arose as a messianic sect from within Second Temple Judaism. The three-year Ministry of Jesus, culminating in his crucifixion, is estimated to have occurred from 28 to 30 CE, although the historicity of Jesus is disputed by a minority of scholars. (Note: For example, in a 2011 review of the state of modern scholarship, Bart Ehrman (a secular agnostic) described the dispute, whilst concluding: "He certainly existed, as virtually every competent scholar of antiquity, Christian or non-Christian, agrees" (Ehrman 2011, p. 285))

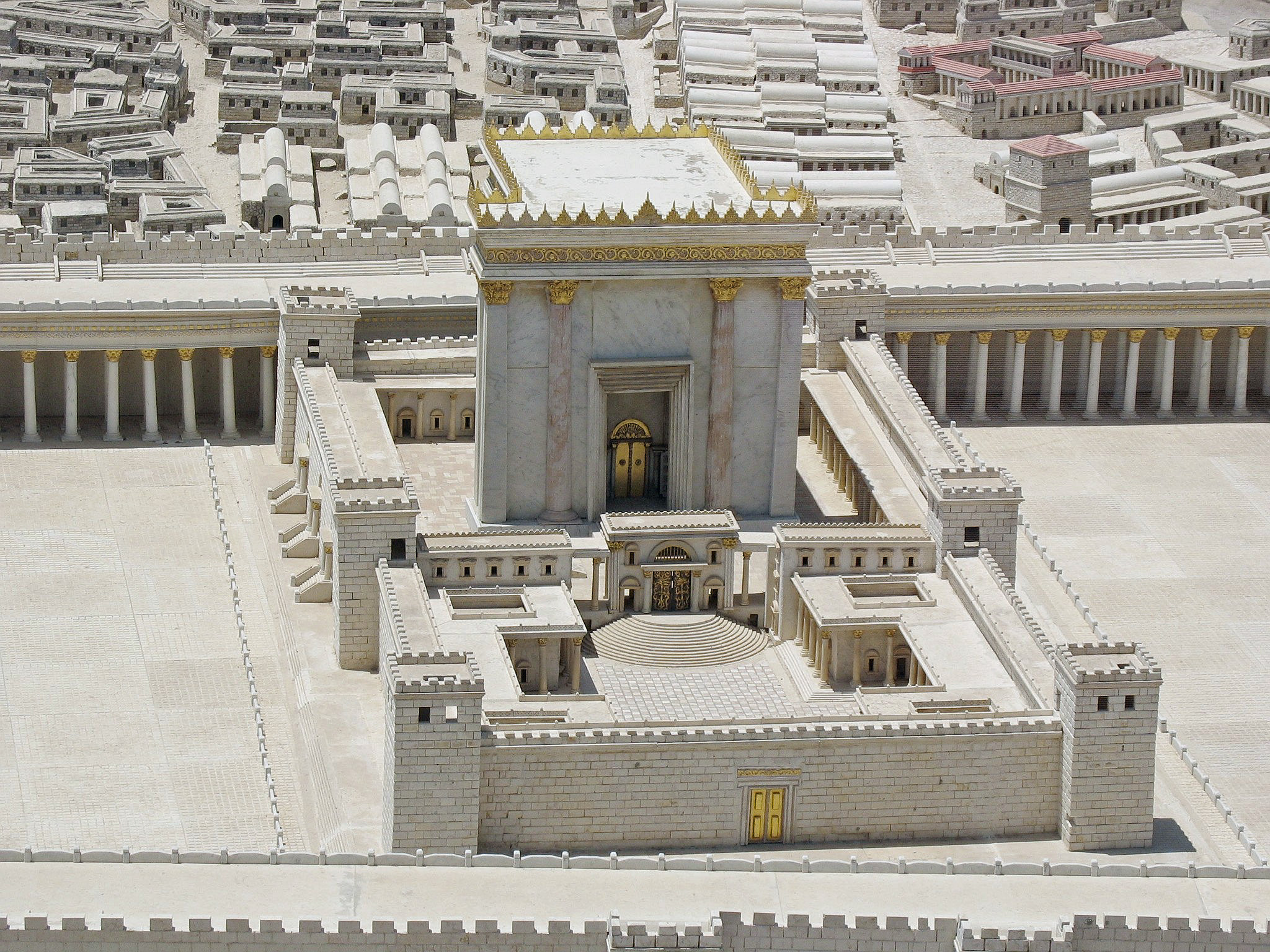
Michael Avi-Yonah's depiction of the Second Temple in the Holyland Model of Jerusalem. The Second Temple was built under Herod and destroyed by the Romans in 70 CE during the First Jewish-Roman War.

In the first and second centuries CE, the province of Judea became the site of two large-scale Jewish revolts against Rome. During the First Jewish-Roman War, which lasted from 66 to 73 CE, the Romans razed Jerusalem and destroyed the Second Temple. In Masada, Jewish zealots reportedly preferred to commit suicide than endure Roman captivity. In 132 CE, another Jewish rebellion erupted. The Bar Kokhba revolt took three years to put down, incurred massive costs on both the Romans and the Jews, and desolated much of Judea. The center of Jewish life in Palestine moved to the Galilee. After the revolt, the Romans enacted a few punitive measures, including restrictions on Jewish religion and practice, and forbade Jews from inhabiting the area surrounding Jerusalem. The city was rebuilt as a Roman colony called Aelia Capitolina. Around this time, the Roman authorities renamed the province of Judaea as Syria Palaestina. Some scholars contend that this was intended to sever the symbolic and historical connection between the Jewish people and the land. Other interpretations have also been proposed.

Between 259 and 272, the region fell under the rule of Odaenathus as King of the Palmyrene Empire. Following the victory of Christian emperor Constantine in the Civil wars of the Tetrarchy, the Christianization of the Roman Empire began, and in 326, Constantine's mother Saint Helena visited Jerusalem and began the construction of churches and shrines. Palestine became a center of Christianity, attracting numerous monks and religious scholars. The Samaritan Revolts during this period caused their near extinction. In 614 CE, Palestine was annexed by another Persian dynasty; the Sassanids, until returning to Byzantine control in 628 CE.

=== Early Muslim period ===
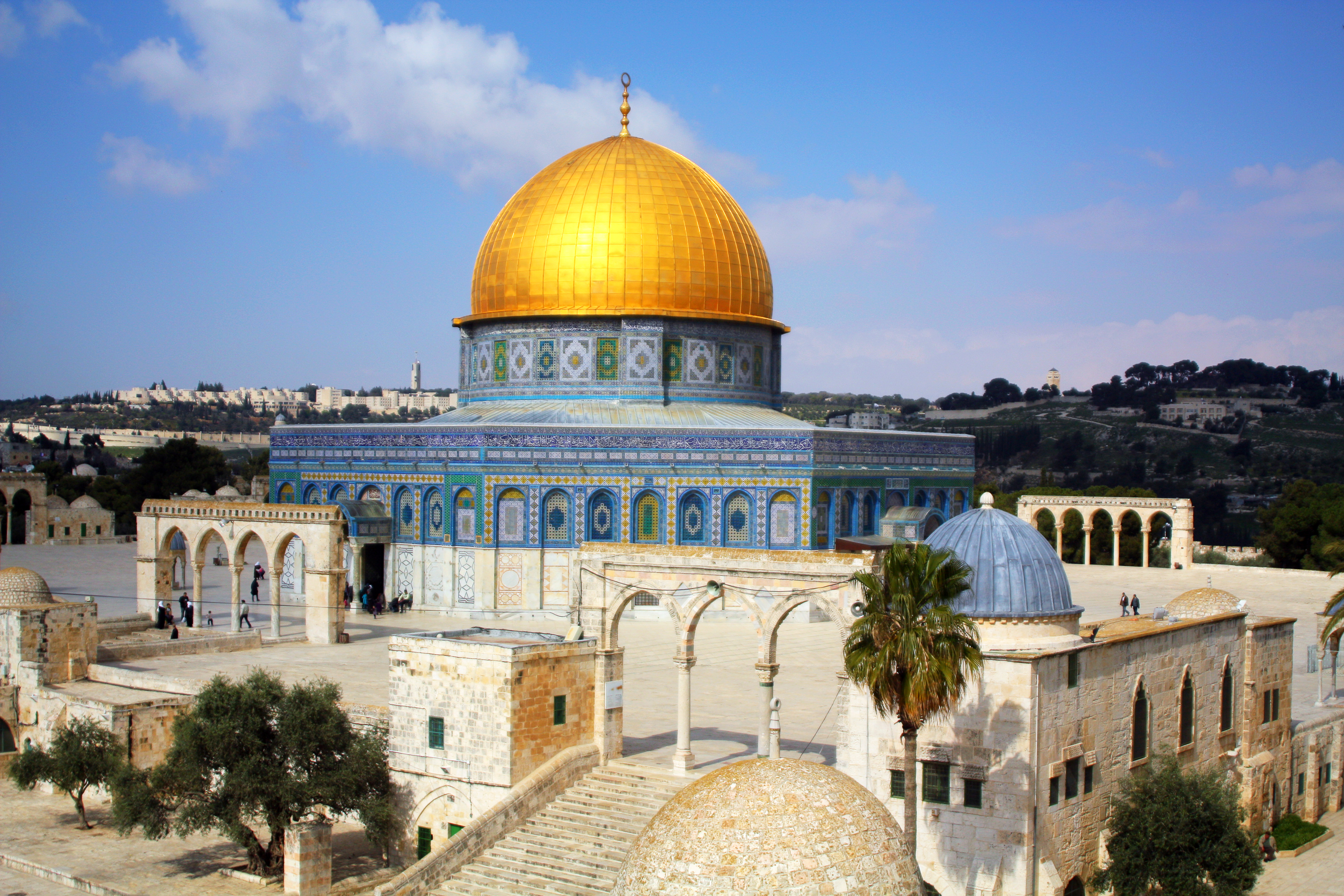
The Dome of the Rock, the world's first great work of Islamic architecture, constructed in 691.

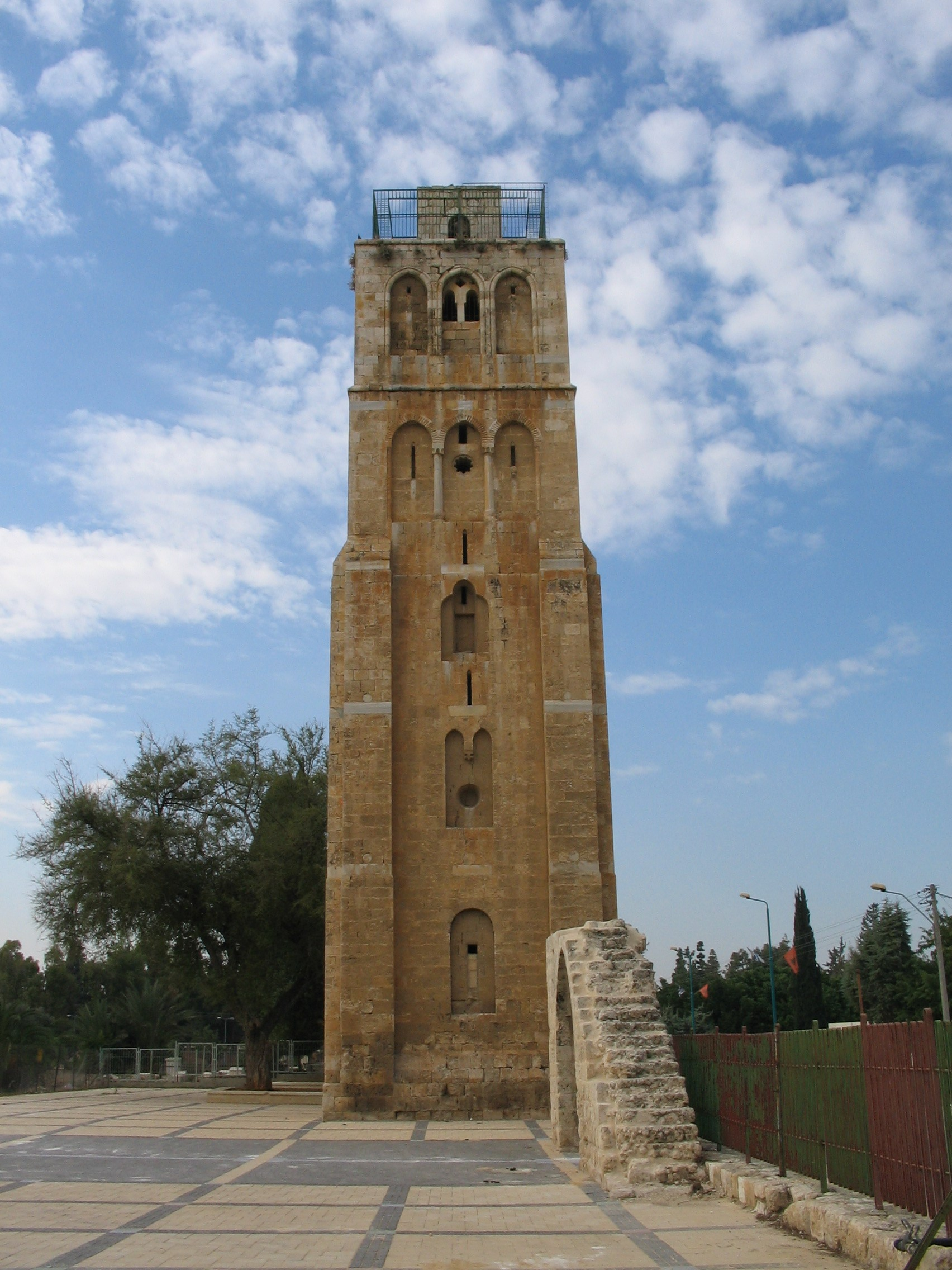
Minaret of the White Mosque in Ramla, constructed in 1318

Arab architecture in the Umayyad and Mamluk periods

Palestine was conquered by the Rashidun Caliphate, beginning in 634 CE. In 636, the Battle of Yarmouk during the Muslim conquest of the Levant marked the start of Muslim hegemony over the region, which became known as the military district of Jund Filastin within the province of Bilâd al-Shâm (Greater Syria). In 661, with the Assassination of Ali, Muawiyah I became the Caliph of the Islamic world after being crowned in Jerusalem. The Dome of the Rock, completed in 691, was the world's first great work of Islamic architecture.

The majority of the population was Christian and was to remain so until the conquest of Saladin in 1187. The Muslim conquest apparently had little impact on social and administrative continuities for several decades. (Note: "The religious situation also evolved under the new masters. Christianity did remain the majority religion, but it lost the privileges it had enjoyed." (Flusin 2011, pp. 199–226, 215)) (Note: The earlier view, exemplifed by the writings of Moshe Gil, argued for a Jewish-Samaritan majority at the time of conquest: "We may reasonably state that at the time if the Muslim conquest, a large Jewish population still lived in Palestine. We do not know whether they formed the majority but we may assume with some certainly that they did so when grouped together with the Samaritans." (Gil 1997, p. 3)) The word 'Arab' at the time referred predominantly to Bedouin nomads, though Arab settlement is attested in the Judean highlands and near Jerusalem by the 5th century, and some tribes had converted to Christianity. The local population engaged in farming, which was considered demeaning, and were called Nabaț, referring to Aramaic-speaking villagers. A ḥadīth, brought in the name of a Muslim freedman who settled in Palestine, ordered the Muslim Arabs not to settle in the villages, "for he who abides in villages it is as if he abides in graves".

The Umayyads, who had spurred a strong economic resurgence in the area, were replaced by the Abbasids in 750. Ramla became the administrative centre for the following centuries, while Tiberias became a thriving centre of Muslim scholarship. From 878, Palestine was ruled from Egypt by semi-autonomous rulers for almost a century, beginning with the Turkish freeman Ahmad ibn Tulun, for whom both Jews and Christians prayed when he lay dying and ending with the Ikhshidid rulers. Reverence for Jerusalem increased during this period, with many of the Egyptian rulers choosing to be buried there. (Note: "Under the Tulunids, Syro-Egyptian territory was deeply imbued with the concept of an extraordinary role devolving upon Jerusalem in Islam as al-Quds, Bayt al-Maqdis or Bayt al-Muqaddas, the "House of Holiness", the seat of the Last Judgment, the Gate to Paradise for Muslims as well as for Jews and Christians. In the popular conscience, this concept established a bond between the three monotheistic religions. If Ahmad ibn Tulun was interred on the slope of the Muqattam [near Cairo], Isa ibn Musa al-Nashari and Takin were laid to rest in Jerusalem in 910 and 933, as were their Ikhshidid successors and Kafir [for context see here]. To honor the great general and governor of Syria Anushtakin al-Dizbiri, who died in 433/1042, the Fatimid Dynasty had his remains solemnly conveyed from Aleppo to Jerusalem in 448/1056-57." (Bianquis 1998, p. 103)) However, the later period became characterized by persecution of Christians as the threat from Byzantium grew. The Fatimids, with a predominantly Berber army, conquered the region in 970, a date that marks the beginning of a period of unceasing warfare between numerous enemies, which destroyed Palestine, and in particular, devastating its Jewish population. Between 1071 and 1073, Palestine was captured by the Great Seljuq Empire, only to be recaptured by the Fatimids in 1098.

=== Crusader/Ayyubid period ===
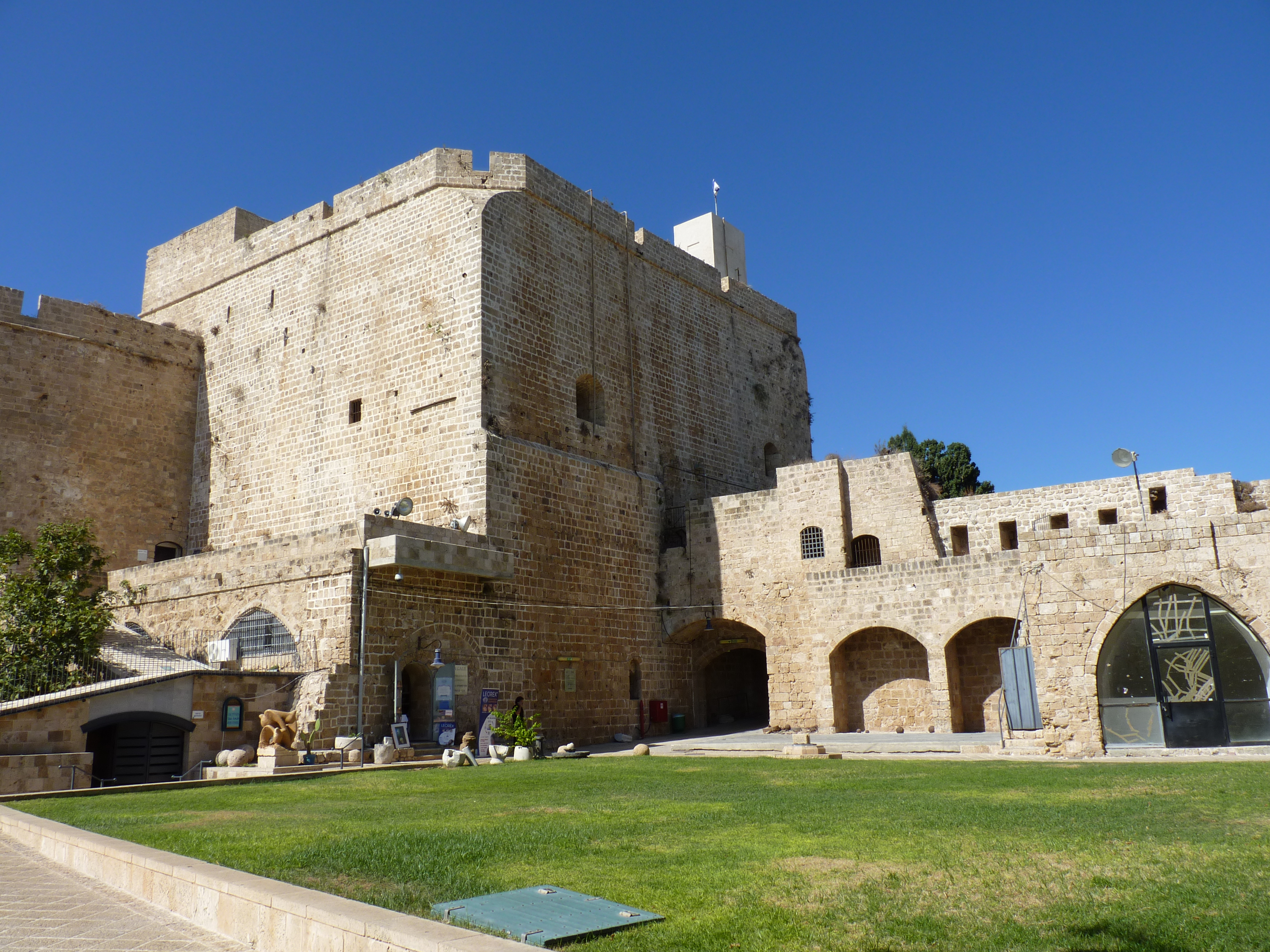
The Hospitaller fortress in Acre was destroyed in 1291 and partially rebuilt in the 18th century.

The Fatimids again lost the region to the Crusaders in 1099. The Crusaders set up the Kingdom of Jerusalem (1099–1291). Their control of Jerusalem and most of Palestine lasted almost a century until their defeat by Saladin's forces in 1187, after which most of Palestine was controlled by the Ayyubids, except for the years 1229–1244 when Jerusalem and other areas were retaken by the Second Kingdom of Jerusalem, by then ruled from Acre (1191–1291), but, despite seven further crusades, the Franks were no longer a significant power in the region. The Fourth Crusade, which did not reach Palestine, led directly to the decline of the Byzantine Empire, dramatically reducing Christian influence throughout the region.

=== Mamluk period ===
The Mamluk Sultanate was created in Egypt as an indirect result of the Seventh Crusade. The Mongol Empire reached Palestine for the first time in 1260, beginning with the Mongol raids into Palestine under Nestorian Christian general Kitbuqa, and reaching an apex at the pivotal Battle of Ain Jalut, where they were pushed back by the Mamluks.

=== Ottoman period ===
In 1486, hostilities broke out between the Mamluks and the Ottoman Empire in a battle for control over western Asia, and the Ottomans conquered Palestine in 1516. Between the mid-16th and 17th centuries, a close-knit alliance of three local dynasties, the Ridwans of Gaza, the Turabays of al-Lajjun and the Farrukhs of Nablus, governed Palestine on behalf of the Porte (imperial Ottoman government).

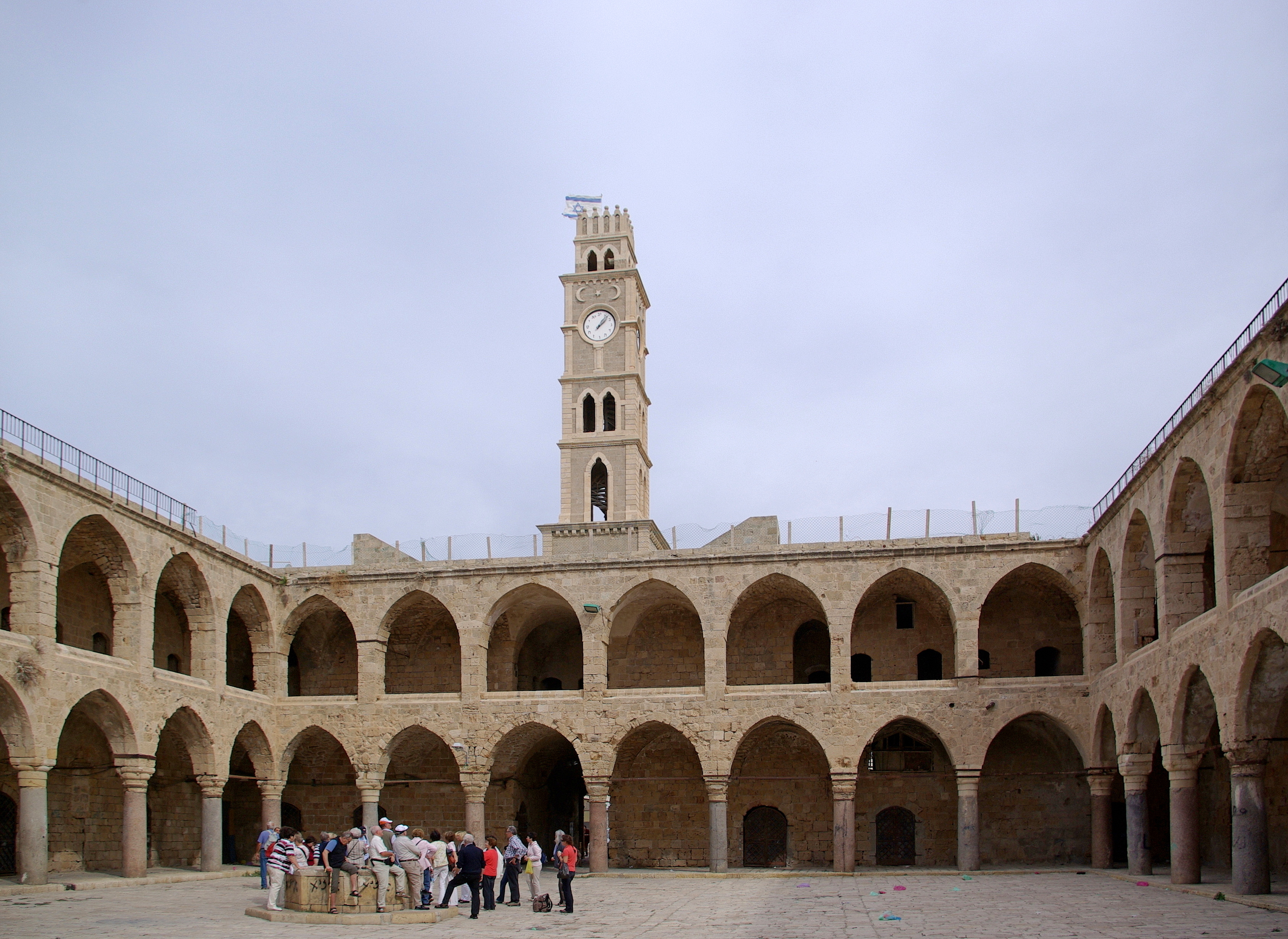
The Khan al-Umdan, constructed in Acre in 1784, is the largest and best preserved caravanserai in the region.

In the 18th century, the Zaydani clan under the leadership of Daher al-Umar ruled large parts of Palestine autonomously until the Ottomans were able to defeat them in their Galilee strongholds in 1775–76. Daher had turned the port city of Acre into a major regional power, partly fueled by his monopolization of the cotton and olive oil trade from Palestine to Europe. Acre's regional dominance was further elevated under Daher's successor Ahmad Pasha al-Jazzar at the expense of Damascus.

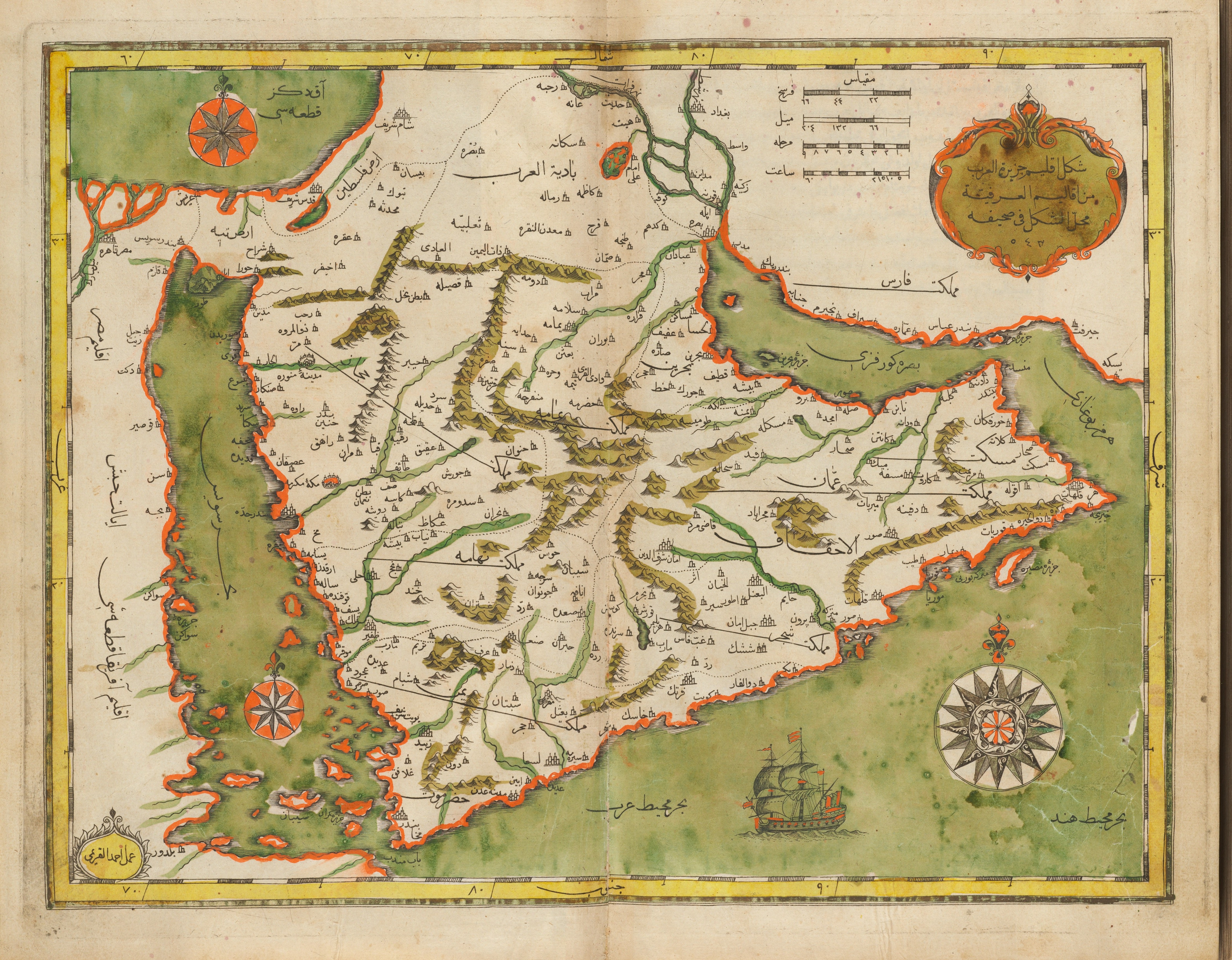
Map of Arabian Peninsula, Kitab-ı cihannüma [Istanbul, 1732] by Katip Celebi. 'Ard Filastin ("The Land of Palestine") is depicted as lying between the two capitals of Jerusalem and Damascus, both bestowed the honorific Sharif (Quds Sharif and Sham Sharif)

In 1830, on the eve of Muhammad Ali's invasion, the Porte transferred control of the sanjaks of Jerusalem and Nablus to Abdullah Pasha, the governor of Acre. According to Silverburg, in regional and cultural terms this move was important for creating an Arab Palestine detached from greater Syria (bilad al-Sham). According to Pappe, it was an attempt to reinforce the Syrian front in face of Muhammad Ali's invasion. Two years later, Palestine was conquered by Muhammad Ali's Egypt, but Egyptian rule was challenged in 1834 by a countrywide popular uprising against conscription and other measures considered intrusive by the population. Its suppression devastated many of Palestine's villages and major towns.

In 1840, Britain intervened and returned control of the Levant to the Ottomans in return for further capitulations. The death of Aqil Agha marked the last local challenge to Ottoman centralization in Palestine, and beginning in the 1860s, Palestine underwent an acceleration in its socio-economic development, due to its incorporation into the global, and particularly European, economic pattern of growth. The beneficiaries of this process were Arabic-speaking Muslims and Christians who emerged as a new layer within the Arab elite. In the southern coastal plain, Palestinian villagers developed distinctive methods of cultivating sandy dunefields (rimāl) known as mawāṣī. These sunken-garden systems supported vineyards, figs, olives, and vegetables, and by the Late Ottoman period had transformed formerly marginal landscapes into productive agricultural zones.

From 1880 large-scale Jewish immigration began, almost entirely from Europe, based on an explicitly Zionist ideology. There was also a revival of the Hebrew language and culture. (Note: "In 1914 about 12,000 Jewish farmers and fieldworkers lived in approximately forty Jewish settlements – and to repeat it once again, they were by no means all Zionists. The dominant languages were still Yiddish, Russian, Polish, Rumanian, Hungarian, or German in the case of Ashkenazi immigrants from Europe, and Ladino (or 'Judeo-Spanish') and Arabic in the case of Sephardic and Oriental Jews. Biblical Hebrew served as the sacred language, while modern Hebrew (Ivrit) remained for the time being the language of a politically committed minority that had devoted itself to a revival of 'Hebrew culture'." (Krämer 2011, p. 120))

Christian Zionism in the United Kingdom preceded its spread within the Jewish community. The government of Great Britain publicly supported it during World War I with the Balfour Declaration of 1917.

=== British Mandate period ===
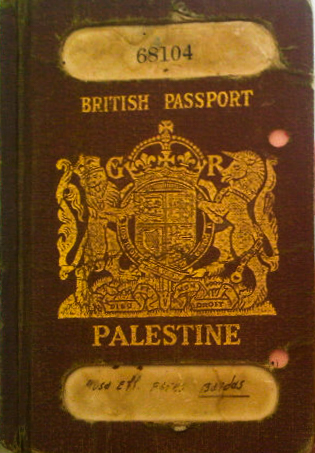
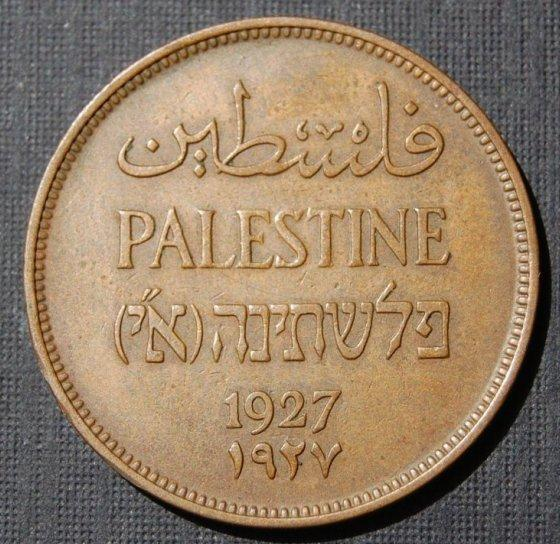
Palestine passport and Palestine coin. The Mandatory authorities agreed a compromise position regarding the Hebrew name: in English and Arabic the name was simply "Palestine" ("فلسطين"), but the Hebrew version ("פלשתינה") also included the acronym ("א״י") for Eretz Yisrael (Land of Israel).
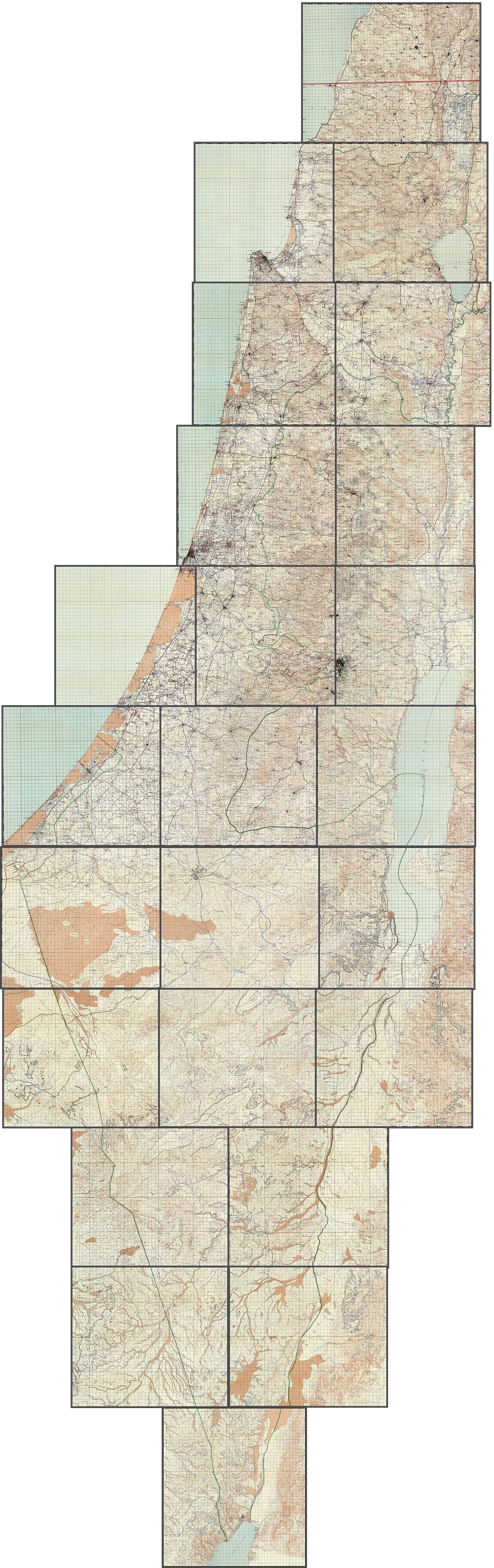
Survey of Palestine 1942–1948 1–100,000 Topographical maps. These maps were processed, updated and printed by the Survey of Israel, while the southern parts of the country were produced solely by the Survey of Israel. Click on each blue link to see the individual original maps in high resolution.

The British began their Sinai and Palestine Campaign in 1915. The war reached southern Palestine in 1917, progressing to Gaza and around Jerusalem by the end of the year. The British secured Jerusalem in December 1917. They moved into the Jordan valley in 1918 and a campaign by the Entente into northern Palestine led to victory at Megiddo in September.

The British were formally awarded the mandate to govern the region in 1922. The Arab Palestinians rioted in 1920, 1921, 1929, and revolted in 1936. In 1947, following World War II and The Holocaust, the British Government announced its desire to terminate the Mandate, and the United Nations General Assembly adopted in November 1947 a Resolution 181(II) recommending partition into an Arab state, a Jewish state and the Special International Regime for the City of Jerusalem. A civil war began immediately after the Resolution's adoption. The State of Israel was declared in May 1948.

=== Arab–Israeli conflict ===
In the 1948 Arab–Israeli War, Israel captured and incorporated a further 26% of the Mandate territory, Jordan captured the regions of Judea and Samaria, (Note: "Transjordan, however, controlled large portions of Judea and Samaria, later known as the West Bank" (Tucker & Roberts 2008, pp. 248–249, 500, 522)) renaming it the "West Bank", while the Gaza Strip was captured by Egypt. Following the 1948 Palestinian expulsion and flight, also known as al-Nakba, the 700,000 Palestinians who fled or were driven from their homes were not allowed to return following the Lausanne Conference of 1949.

In the course of the Six-Day War in June 1967, Israel captured the rest of Mandate Palestine from Jordan and Egypt, and began a policy of establishing Jewish settlements in those territories. From 1987 to 1993, the First Palestinian Intifada against Israel took place, which included the Declaration of the State of Palestine in 1988 and ended with the 1993 Oslo Peace Accords and the creation of the Palestinian National Authority.

In 2000, the Second Intifada (also called al-Aqsa Intifada) began, and Israel built a separation barrier. In the 2005 Israeli disengagement from Gaza, Israel withdrew all settlers and military presence from the Gaza Strip, but maintained military control of numerous aspects of the territory including its borders, air space and coast. Israel's ongoing military occupation of the Gaza Strip, the West Bank and East Jerusalem continues to be the world's longest military occupation in modern times. (Note: The majority of the international community (including the UN General Assembly, the United Nations Security Council, the European Union, the International Criminal Court, and the vast majority of human rights organizations) considers Israel to be continuing to occupying Gaza, the West Bank and East Jerusalem. The government of Israel and some supporters have, at times, disputed this position of the international community. In 2011, Andrew Sanger explained the situation as follows: "Israel claims it no longer occupies the Gaza Strip, maintaining that it is neither a Stale nor a territory occupied or controlled by Israel, but rather it has 'sui generis' status. Pursuant to the Disengagement Plan, Israel dismantled all military institutions and settlements in Gaza and there is no longer a permanent Israeli military or civilian presence in the territory. However the Plan also provided that Israel will guard and monitor the external land perimeter of the Gaza Strip, will continue to maintain exclusive authority in Gaza air space, and will continue to exercise security activity in the sea off the coast of the Gaza Strip as well as maintaining an Israeli military presence on the Egyptian-Gaza border. and reserving the right to reenter Gaza at will. Israel continues to control six of Gaza's seven land crossings, its maritime borders and airspace and the movement of goods and persons in and out of the territory. Egypt controls one of Gaza's land crossings. Troops from the Israeli Defence Force regularly enter pans of the territory and/or deploy missile attacks, drones and sonic bombs into Gaza. Israel has declared a no-go buffer zone that stretches deep into Gaza: if Gazans enter this zone they are shot on sight. Gaza is also dependent on Israel for inter alia electricity, currency, telephone networks, issuing IDs, and permits to enter and leave the territory. Israel also has sole control of the Palestinian Population Registry through which the Israeli Army regulates who is classified as a Palestinian and who is a Gazan or West Banker. Since 2000 aside from a limited number of exceptions Israel has refused to add people to the Palestinian Population Registry. It is this direct external control over Gaza and indirect control over life within Gaza that has led the United Nations, the UN General Assembly, the UN Fact Finding Mission to Gaza, International human rights organisations, US Government websites, the UK Foreign and Commonwealth Office and a significant number of legal commentators, to reject the argument that Gaza is no longer occupied.", and in 2012 Iain Scobbie explained: "Even after the accession to power of Hamas, Israel's claim that it no longer occupies Gaza has not been accepted by UN bodies, most States, nor the majority of academic commentators because of its exclusive control of its border with Gaza and crossing points including the effective control it exerted over the Rafah crossing until at least May 2011, its control of Gaza's maritime zones and airspace which constitute what Aronson terms the 'security envelope' around Gaza, as well as its ability to intervene forcibly at will in Gaza" and Michelle Gawerc wrote in the same year: "While Israel withdrew from the immediate territory, Israel still controlled all access to and from Gaza through the border crossings, as well as through the coastline and the airspace. ln addition, Gaza was dependent upon Israel for water electricity sewage communication networks and for its trade (Gisha 2007. Dowty 2008). In other words, while Israel maintained that its occupation of Gaza ended with its unilateral disengagement Palestinians – as well as many human right organizations and international bodies – argued that Gaza was by all intents and purposes still occupied." For more details of this terminology dispute, including with respect to the current status of the Gaza Strip, see International views on the Israeli-occupied territories and Status of territories captured by Israel.) (Note: For an explanation of the differences between an annexed but disputed territory (e.g. Tibet) and a militarily occupied territory, please see the article Military occupation. The "longest military occupation" description has been described in a number of ways, including: "The Israeli occupation of the West Bank and Gaza is the longest military occupation in modern times," "...longest official military occupation of modern history—currently entering its thirty-fifth year," "...longest-lasting military occupation of the modern age, " "This is probably the longest occupation in modern international relations, and it holds a central place in all literature on the law of belligerent occupation since the early 1970s," "These are settlements and a military occupation that is the longest in the twentieth and twenty-first century, the longest formerly being the Japanese occupation of Korea from 1910 to 1945. So this is thirty-three years old [in 2000], pushing the record," "Israel is the only modern state that has held territories under military occupation for over four decades." In 2014 Sharon Weill provided further context, writing: "Although the basic philosophy behind the law of military occupation is that it is a temporary situation modem occupations have well demonstrated that rien ne dure comme le provisoire A significant number of post-1945 occupations have lasted more than two decades such as the occupations of Namibia by South Africa and of East Timor by Indonesia as well as the ongoing occupations of Northern Cyprus by Turkey and of Western Sahara by Morocco. The Israeli occupation of the Palestinian territories, which is the longest in all occupation's history has already entered its fifth decade.")

In 2008 Palestinian hikaye was inscribed to UNESCO's list of intangible cultural heritage; the first of four listings reflecting the significance of Palestinian culture globally.

In November 2012, the status of Palestinian delegation in the United Nations was upgraded to non-member observer state as the State of Palestine. (Note: See United Nations General Assembly resolution 67/19 for further details)

== Boundaries ==
=== Pre-modern period ===
The boundaries of Palestine have varied throughout history. (Note: According to the Jewish Encyclopedia published between 1901 and 1906: "Palestine extends, from 31° to 33° 20' N. latitude. Its southwest point (at Raphia, Tell Rifaḥ, southwest of Gaza) is about 34° 15' E. longitude, and its northwest point (mouth of the Liṭani) is at 35° 15' E. longitude, while the course of the Jordan reaches 35° 35' to the east. The west-Jordan country has, consequently, a length of about 150 English miles from north to south, and a breadth of about 23 miles (37 km) at the north and 80 miles (129 km) at the south. The area of this region, as measured by the surveyors of the English Palestine Exploration Fund, is about 6,040 square miles (15,644 km^{2}). The east-Jordan district is now being surveyed by the German Palästina-Verein, and although the work is not yet completed, its area may be estimated at 4,000 square miles (10,360 km^{2}). This entire region, as stated above, was not occupied exclusively by the Israelites, for the plain along the coast in the south belonged to the Philistines, and that in the north to the Phoenicians, while in the east-Jordan country, the Israelitic possessions never extended farther than the Arnon (Wadi al-Mujib) in the south, nor did the Israelites ever settle in the most northerly and easterly portions of the plain of Bashan. To-day the number of inhabitants does not exceed 650,000. Palestine, and especially the Israelitic state, covered, therefore, a very small area, approximating that of the state of Vermont." From the Jewish Encyclopedia) (Note: According to the Encyclopædia Britannica Eleventh Edition (1911), Palestine is: "[A] geographical name of rather loose application. Etymological strictness would require it to denote exclusively the narrow strip of coast-land once occupied by the Philistines, from whose name it is derived. It is, however, conventionally used as a name for the territory which, in the Old Testament, is claimed as the inheritance of the pre-exilic Hebrews; thus it may be said generally to denote the southern third of the province of Syria. Except in the west, where the country is bordered by the Mediterranean Sea, the limit of this territory cannot be laid down on the map as a definite line. The modern subdivisions under the jurisdiction of the Ottoman Empire are in no sense conterminous with those of antiquity, and hence do not afford a boundary by which Palestine can be separated exactly from the rest of Syria in the north, or from the Sinaitic and Arabian deserts in the south and east; nor are the records of ancient boundaries sufficiently full and definite to make possible the complete demarcation of the country. Even the convention above referred to is inexact: it includes the Philistine territory, claimed but never settled by the Hebrews, and excludes the outlying parts of the large area claimed in Num. xxxiv. as the Hebrew possession (from the " River of Egypt " to Hamath). However, the Hebrews themselves have preserved, in the proverbial expression " from Dan to Beersheba " (Judg. xx.i, &c.), an indication of the normal north-and-south limits of their land; and in defining the area of the country under discussion it is this indication which is generally followed. Taking as a guide the natural features most nearly corresponding to these outlying points, we may describe Palestine as the strip of land extending along the eastern shore of the Mediterranean Sea from the mouth of the Litany or Kasimiya River (33° 20' N.) southward to the mouth of the Wadi Ghuzza; the latter joins the sea in 31° 28' N., a short distance south of Gaza, and runs thence in a south-easterly direction so as to include on its northern side the site of Beersheba. Eastward there is no such definite border. The River Jordan, it is true, marks a line of delimitation between Western and Eastern Palestine; but it is practically impossible to say where the latter ends and the Arabian desert begins. Perhaps the line of the pilgrim road from Damascus to Mecca is the most convenient possible boundary. The total length of the region is about 140 m (459.32 ft); its breadth west of the Jordan ranges from about 23 m (75.46 ft) in the north to about 80 m (262.47 ft) in the south.") The Jordan Rift Valley (comprising Wadi Arabah, the Dead Sea and River Jordan) has at times formed a political and administrative frontier, even within empires that have controlled both territories. At other times, such as during certain periods during the Hasmonean and Crusader states for example, as well as during the biblical period, territories on both sides of the river formed part of the same administrative unit. During the Arab Caliphate period, parts of southern Lebanon and the northern highland areas of Palestine and Jordan were administered as Jund al-Urdun, while the southern parts of the latter two formed part of Jund Dimashq, which during the 9th century was attached to the administrative unit of Jund Filastin.

The boundaries of the area and the ethnic nature of the people referred to by Herodotus in the 5th century BCE as Palaestina vary according to context. Sometimes, he uses it to refer to the coast north of Mount Carmel. Elsewhere, distinguishing the Syrians in Palestine from the Phoenicians, he refers to their land as extending down all the coast from Phoenicia to Egypt. Pliny, writing in Latin in the 1st century CE, describes a region of Syria that was "formerly called Palaestina" among the areas of the Eastern Mediterranean.

Since the Byzantine Period, the Byzantine borders of Palaestina (I and II, also known as Palaestina Prima, "First Palestine", and Palaestina Secunda, "Second Palestine"), have served as a name for the geographic area between the Jordan River and the Mediterranean Sea. Under Arab rule, Filastin (or Jund Filastin) was used administratively to refer to what was under the Byzantines Palaestina Secunda (comprising Judaea and Samaria), while Palaestina Prima (comprising the Galilee region) was renamed Urdunn ("Jordan" or Jund al-Urdunn).

=== Modern period ===
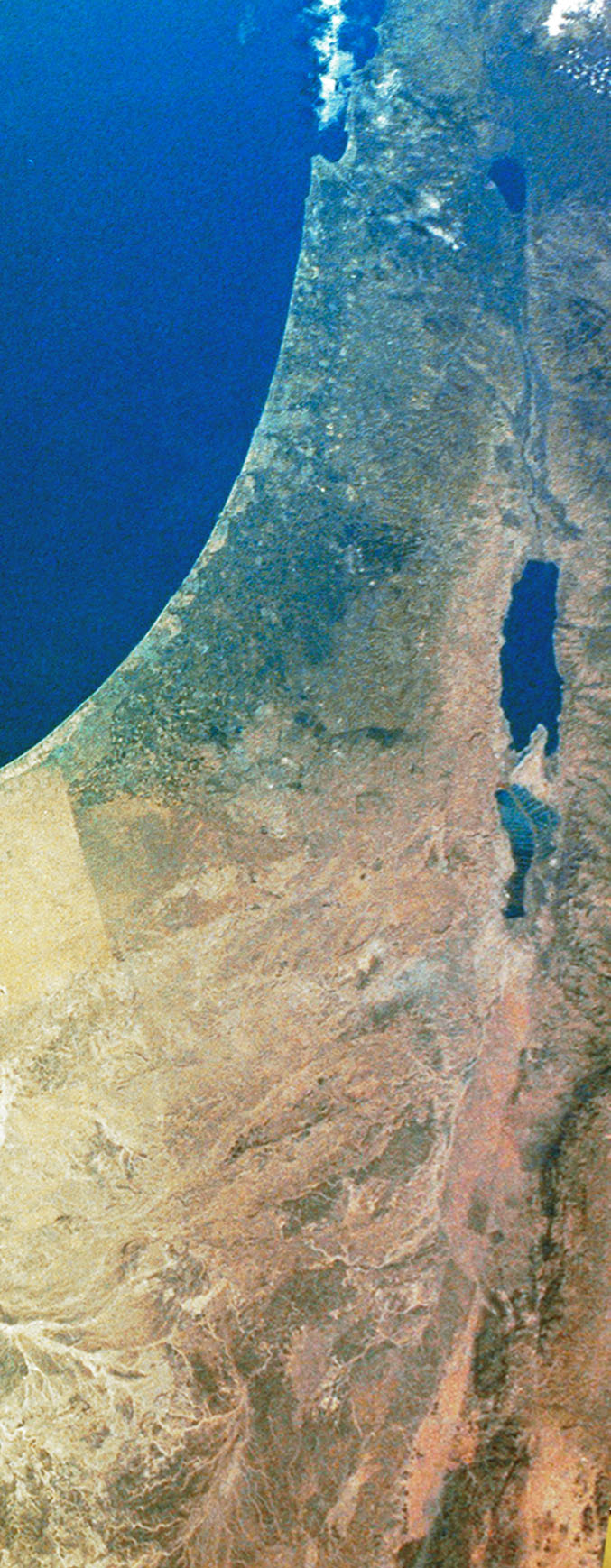
Satellite image of the region

Nineteenth-century sources refer to Palestine as extending from the sea to the caravan route, presumably the Hejaz-Damascus route east of the Jordan River valley. Others refer to it as extending from the sea to the desert. Prior to the Allied Powers victory in World War I and the partitioning of the Ottoman Empire, which created the British mandate in the Levant, most of the northern area of what is today Jordan formed part of the Ottoman Vilayet of Damascus (Syria), while the southern part of Jordan was part of the Vilayet of Hejaz. What later became Mandatory Palestine was in late Ottoman times divided between the Vilayet of Beirut (Lebanon) and the Sanjak of Jerusalem. The Zionist Organization provided its definition of the boundaries of Palestine in a statement to the Paris Peace Conference in 1919.

The British administered Mandatory Palestine after World War I, having promised to establish a homeland for the Jewish people. The modern definition of the region follows the boundaries of that entity, which were fixed in the North and East in 1920–23 by the British Mandate for Palestine (including the Transjordan memorandum) and the Paulet–Newcombe Agreement, and on the South by following the 1906 Turco-Egyptian boundary agreement.

Modern evolution of Palestine

1916–1922 various proposals: Three proposals for the post World War I administration of Palestine. The red line is the "International Administration" proposed in the 1916 Sykes–Picot Agreement, the dashed blue line is the 1919 Zionist Organization proposal at the Paris Peace Conference, and the thin blue line refers to the final borders of the 1923–48 Mandatory Palestine.

1937 British proposal: The first official proposal for partition, published in 1937 by the Peel Commission. An ongoing British Mandate was proposed to keep "the sanctity of Jerusalem and Bethlehem", in the form of an enclave from Jerusalem to Jaffa, including Lydda and Ramle.

1947 UN proposal: Proposal per the United Nations Partition Plan for Palestine (UN General Assembly Resolution 181 (II), 1947), prior to the 1948 Arab–Israeli War. The proposal included a Corpus Separatum for Jerusalem, extraterritorial crossroads between the non-contiguous areas, and Jaffa as an Arab exclave.

1947 Jewish private land ownership: Jewish-owned lands in Mandatory Palestine as of 1947 in blue, constituting 7.4% of the total land area, of which more than half was held by the JNF and PICA. White is either public land or Palestinian-Arab-owned lands including related religious trusts.

1949 armistice lines (Green Line): The 1949 armistice lines after the 1948 Palestine war first formally established the borders of Israel (blue line), the Jordanian-annexed West Bank (light green), and Egyptian client state All-Palestine Protectorate (dark green).

1967 territorial changes: During the Six-Day War, Israel captured the West Bank, the Gaza Strip, and the Golan Heights, together with the Sinai Peninsula (later traded for peace after the Yom Kippur War). In 1980–81 Israel annexed East Jerusalem and the Golan Heights. Neither Israel's annexation nor the PLO claim over East Jerusalem gained international recognition.

1995 Oslo II Accord: Under the Oslo Accords, the Palestinian National Authority was created to provide a Palestinian interim self-government in the West Bank and the interior of the Gaza Strip. Its second phase envisioned "Palestinian enclaves".

2005–present: After the Israeli disengagement from Gaza and clashes between the two main Palestinian parties following the Hamas electoral victory, two separate executive governments took control in the Palestinian territories of the West Bank and Gaza.

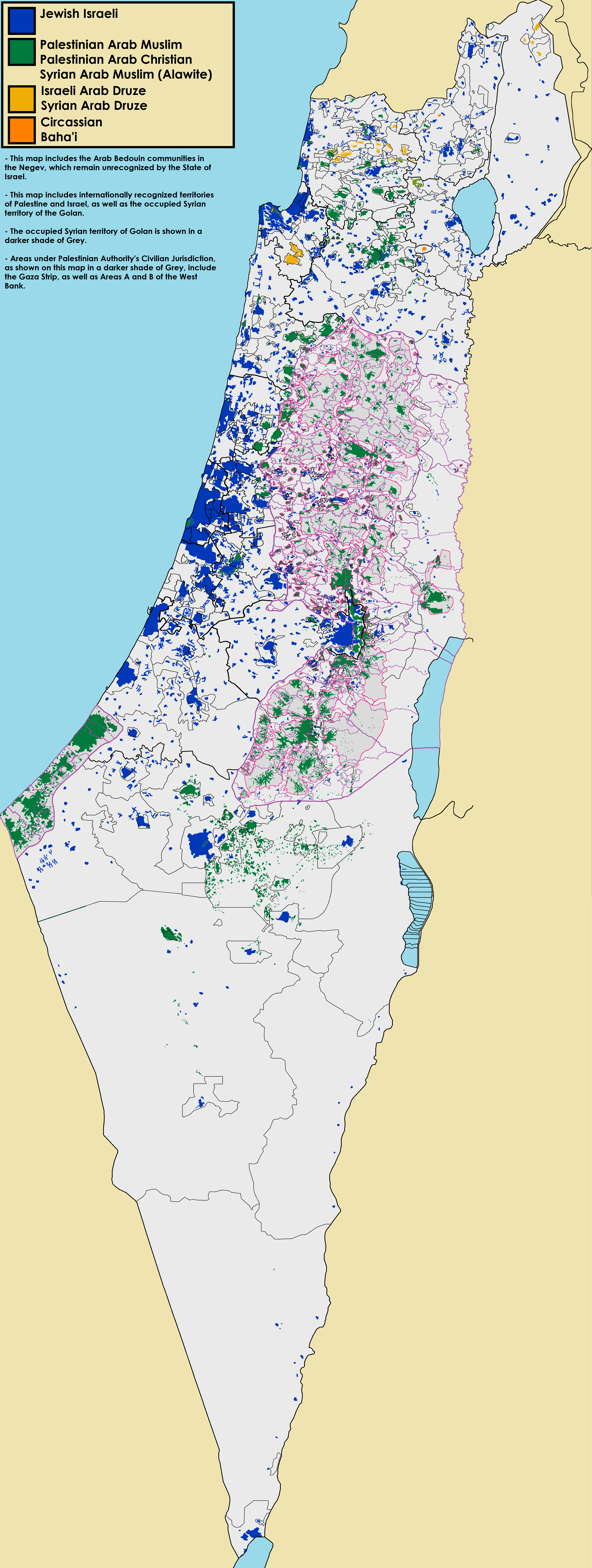
Ethnic majority by settlement (present): The map indicates the ethnic majority of settlements (cities, villages and other communities).

=== Current usage ===
The region of Palestine is the eponym for the Palestinian people and the culture of Palestine, both of which are defined as relating to the whole historical region, usually defined as the localities within the border of Mandatory Palestine. The 1968 Palestinian National Covenant described Palestine as the "homeland of the Arab Palestinian people", with "the boundaries it had during the British Mandate".

However, since the 1988 Palestinian Declaration of Independence, the term State of Palestine refers only to the West Bank and the Gaza Strip. This discrepancy was described by the Palestinian president Mahmoud Abbas as a negotiated concession in a September 2011 speech to the United Nations: "... we agreed to establish the State of Palestine on only 22% of the territory of historical Palestine – on all the Palestinian Territory occupied by Israel in 1967."

The term Palestine is also sometimes used in a limited sense to refer to the parts of the Palestinian territories currently under the administrative control of the Palestinian National Authority, a quasi-governmental entity which governs parts of the State of Palestine under the terms of the Oslo Accords. (Note: See for example, Palestinian school textbooks (Note: "The term Palestine in the textbooks refers to Palestinian National Authority." (Adwan 2006, p. 242)))

== Administration ==
Overview of administration and sovereignty in Israel, the Palestinian territories and the Golan Heights
Area		Administered by	Recognition of governing authority	Sovereignty claimed by	Recognition of claim
Gaza Strip		Palestinian National Authority (de jure) Controlled by Hamas (de facto)	Witnesses to the Oslo II Accord	Palestine	157 UN member states
West Bank	Palestinian enclaves (Areas A and B)	Palestinian National Authority and Israeli military	Witnesses to the Oslo II Accord	Palestine	157 UN member states
West Bank	Area C	Israeli enclave law (Israeli settlements) and Israeli military (Palestinians under Israeli occupation)	Witnesses to the Oslo II Accord	Palestine	157 UN member states
West Bank	East Jerusalem	Israeli administration	Honduras, Guatemala, Nauru, and the United States	Palestine	China, Russia
West Jerusalem		Israeli administration	Russia, Czech Republic, Honduras, Guatemala, Nauru, and the United States	United Nations as an international city along with East Jerusalem	Various UN member states and the European Union; joint sovereignty also widely supported
Golan Heights		Israeli administration	United States and Colombia	Syria	All UN member states except the United States and Colombia
Israel (Green Line border)		Israeli administration	165 UN member states	Israel	165 UN member states

== Demographics ==
=== Early demographics ===
Year	Jews	Christians	Muslims	Total
First half 1st century CE	Majority	–	–	~2,500
5th century	Minority	Majority	–	>1st C
End 12th century	Minority	Minority	Majority	>225
14th century before Black Death	Minority	Minority	Majority	225
14th century after Black Death	Minority	Minority	Majority	150
Historical population table compiled by Sergio DellaPergola. Figures in thousands.

Estimating the population of Palestine in antiquity relies on two methods – censuses and writings made at the times, and the scientific method based on excavations and statistical methods that consider the number of settlements at the particular age, area of each settlement, density factor for each settlement.

The Bar Kokhba revolt in the 2nd century CE saw a major shift in the population of Palestine. The sheer scale and scope of the overall destruction has been described by Dio Cassius in his Roman History, where he notes that Roman war operations in the country had left some 580,000 Jews dead, with many more dying of hunger and disease, while 50 of their most important outposts and 985 of their most famous villages were razed to the ground. "Thus," writes Dio Cassius, "nearly the whole of Judaea was made desolate."

According to Israeli archaeologists Magen Broshi and Yigal Shiloh, the population of ancient Palestine did not exceed one million. (Note: "... the population of Palestine in antiquity did not exceed a million persons. It can also be shown, moreover, that this was more or less the size of the population in the peak period—the late Byzantine period, around AD 600" (Broshi 1979, p. 7)) (Note: "... the population of the country in the Roman-Byzantine period greatly exceeded that in the Iron Age... If we accept Broshi's population estimates, which appear to be confirmed by the results of recent research, it follows that the estimates for the population during the Iron Age must be set at a lower figure." (Shiloh 1980, p. 33)) By 300 CE, Christianity had spread so significantly that Jews comprised only a quarter of the population. (Note: "By A.D. 300, Jews made up a mere quarter of the total population of the province of Syria Palaestina" (Krämer 2011, p. 15))

=== Late Ottoman and British Mandate periods ===
In a study of Ottoman registers of the early Ottoman rule of Palestine, Bernard Lewis reports:

[T]he first half century of Ottoman rule brought a sharp increase in population. The towns grew rapidly, villages became larger and more numerous, and there was an extensive development of agriculture, industry, and trade. The two last were certainly helped to no small extent by the influx of Spanish and other Western Jews.

From the mass of detail in the registers, it is possible to extract something like a general picture of the economic life of the country in that period. Out of a total population of about 300,000 souls, between a fifth and a quarter lived in the six towns of Jerusalem, Gaza, Safed, Nablus, Ramle, and Hebron. The remainder consisted mainly of peasants, living in villages of varying size, and engaged in agriculture. Their main food-crops were wheat and barley in that order, supplemented by leguminous pulses, olives, fruit, and vegetables. In and around most of the towns there was a considerable number of vineyards, orchards, and vegetable gardens.

Year	Jews	Christians	Muslims	Total
1533–1539	5	6	145	157
1690–1691	2	11	219	232
1800	7	22	246	275
1890	43	57	432	532
1914	94	70	525	689
1922	84	71	589	752
1931	175	89	760	1,033
1947	630	143	1,181	1,970
Historical population table compiled by Sergio DellaPergola. Figures in thousands.

According to Alexander Schölch, the population of Palestine in 1850 was about 350,000 inhabitants, 30% of whom lived in 13 towns; roughly 85% were Muslims, 11% were Christians and 4% Jews.

According to Ottoman statistics studied by Justin McCarthy, the population of Palestine in the early 19th century was 350,000, in 1860 it was 411,000 and in 1900 about 600,000 of whom 94% were Arabs. In 1914 Palestine had a population of 657,000 Muslim Arabs, 81,000 Christian Arabs, and 59,000 Jews. McCarthy estimates the non-Jewish population of Palestine at 452,789 in 1882; 737,389 in 1914; 725,507 in 1922; 880,746 in 1931; and 1,339,763 in 1946.

In 1920, the League of Nations' Interim Report on the Civil Administration of Palestine described the 700,000 people living in Palestine as follows:

Of these, 235,000 live in the larger towns, 465,000 in the smaller towns and villages. Four-fifths of the whole population are Moslems. A small proportion of these are Bedouin Arabs; the remainder, although they speak Arabic and are termed Arabs, are largely of mixed race. Some 77,000 of the population are Christians, in large majority belonging to the Orthodox Church, and speaking Arabic. The minority are members of the Latin or of the Uniate Greek Catholic Church, or—a small number—are Protestants. The Jewish element of the population numbers 76,000. Almost all have entered Palestine during the last 40 years. Prior to 1850, there were in the country only a handful of Jews. In the following 30 years, a few hundreds came to Palestine. Most of them were animated by religious motives; they came to pray and to die in the Holy Land, and to be buried in its soil. After the persecutions in Russia forty years ago, the movement of the Jews to Palestine assumed larger proportions.

=== Current demographics ===
According to the Israel Central Bureau of Statistics, as of 2015, the total population of Israel was 8.5 million people, of which 75% were Jews, 21% Arabs, and 4% "others". Of the Jewish group, 76% were Sabras (born in Israel); the rest were olim (immigrants)—16% from Europe, the former Soviet republics, and the Americas, and 8% from Asia and Africa, including the Arab countries.

According to the Palestinian Central Bureau of Statistics evaluations, in 2015 the Palestinian population of the West Bank was approximately 2.9 million and that of the Gaza Strip was 1.8 million.

Both Israeli and Palestinian statistics include Arab residents of East Jerusalem in their reports. According to these estimates the total population in the region of Palestine, as defined as Israel and the Palestinian territories, stands approximately 12.8 million.

== Flora and fauna ==
=== Flora distribution ===
The World Geographical Scheme for Recording Plant Distributions is widely used in recording the distribution of plants. The scheme uses the code "PAL" to refer to the region of Palestine – a Level 3 area. The WGSRPD's Palestine is further divided into Israel (PAL-IS), including the Palestinian territories, and Jordan (PAL-JO), so is larger than some other definitions of "Palestine". Flora Palaestina used essentially the same geographical area, but included the Golan Heights.

== See also ==
- Cartography of Palestine
- Israel-Palestine
- Place names of Palestine
- Levantine archaeology (also called 'Palestinian archaeology')
- Palestine Exploration Fund

== Bibliography ==
- Abu-Lughod, Ibrahim, ed. (1971). The Transformation of Palestine. Evanston, Illinois: Northwestern Press.
- Abu-Manneh, Butrus (1999). "The Rise of the Sanjak of Jerusalem in the Late Nineteenth Century". In Pappé, Ilan (ed.). The Israel/Palestine Question. Routledge. ISBN 978-0-415-16948-6.
- Adwan, Sami (2006). "Textbooks in the Palestinian National Authority". In Greenbaum, Charles W.; Veerman, Philip E.; Bacon-Shnoor, Naomi (eds.). Protection of Children During Armed Political Conflict: A Multidisciplinary Perspective. Intersentia. pp. 231–256. ISBN 978-90-5095-341-2.
- Aharoni, Yohanan (1 January 1979). The Land of the Bible: A Historical Geography. Westminster John Knox Press. p. 64. ISBN 978-0-664-24266-4. "The desert served as an eastern boundary in times when Transjordan was occupied. But when Transjordan became an unsettled region, a pasturage for desert nomads, then the Jordan Valley and the Dead Sea formed the natural eastern boundary of Western Palestine."
- Ahlström, Gösta Werner (1993). The history of ancient Palestine. Fortress Press. ISBN 978-0-8006-2770-6.
- Alexandrowicz, Ra'anan (2012), "The Justice of Occupation", The New York Times
- Anderson, Perry (2001). "Editorial: Scurrying Towards Bethlehem". New Left Review. Vol. 10. Archived from the original on 1 October 2018.
- Anspacher, Abraham Samuel (1912). Tiglath Pileser III – via Internet Archive.
- Avneri, Arieh L. (1984). The Claim of Dispossession. Tel Aviv: Hidekel Press. ISBN 978-0-87855-964-0.
- Avni, Gideon (2014). The Byzantine-Islamic Transition in Palestine: An Archaeological Approach. Oxford University Press. ISBN 978-0-19-968433-5.
- Bachi, Roberto (1974). The Population of Israel. Jerusalem: Institute of Contemporary Jewry, Hebrew University.
- Belfer-Cohen, Anna; Bar-Yosef, Ofer (2000). "Early Sedentism in the Near East: A Bumpy Ride to Village Life". In Kuijt, Ian (ed.). Life in Neolithic Farming Communities: social organization, identity, and differentiation. New York: Kluwer Academic/Plenum Publishers. ISBN 978-0-306-46122-4.
- Bianquis, Thierry (1998). "Autonomous Egypt from Ibn Tulun to Kafur 868-969". In Daly, Martin W.; Petry, Carl F. (eds.). The Cambridge History of Egypt. Vol. 2. Cambridge University Press. pp. 86–119. ISBN 978-0-521-47137-4.
- Biger, Gideon (1981). "Where was Palestine? pre-World War I perception". AREA (Journal of the Institute of British Geographers). 13 (2): 153–160.
- Biger, Gideon (2004). The Boundaries of Modern Palestine, 1840–1947. RoutledgeCurzon. passim. ISBN 978-1-135-76652-8.
- Boas, Adrian J. (2001). Jerusalem in the Time of the Crusades: Society, Landscape and Art in the Holy City Under Frankish Rule. London: Routledge. pp. 19–20. ISBN 978-0-415-23000-1.
- Breasted, James Henry (2001). Ancient Records of Egypt: The first through the seventeenth dynasties. University of Illinois Press. ISBN 978-0-252-06990-1.
- Broshi, Magen (1979). "The Population of Western Palestine in the Roman-Byzantine Period". Bulletin of the American Schools of Oriental Research. 236 (236): 1–10. doi:10.2307/1356664. JSTOR 1356664. PMID 12338473. S2CID 24341643.
- Brown, Daniel W. A New Introduction to Islam (2nd ed.). Wiley-Blackwell.
- Brummitt, R.K. (2001). World Geographical Scheme for Recording Plant Distributions: Edition 2 (PDF). International Working Group on Taxonomic Databases For Plant Sciences (TDWG). ISBN 978-0-913196-72-4. Archived from the original (PDF) on 25 January 2016.
- Burns, Ross (2005). Damascus: A History. London: Routledge. ISBN 978-0-415-27105-9.
- Büssow, Johann (2011). Hamidian Palestine: Politics and Society in the District of Jerusalem 1872–1908. BRILL. ISBN 978-90-04-20569-7.
- Byatt, Anthony (1973). "Josephus and Population Numbers in First-century Palestine". Palestine Exploration Quarterly. 105: 51–60. doi:10.1179/peq.1973.105.1.51.
- Cavendish, Marshall (2007). Peoples of Western Asia (Illustrated ed.). Marshall Cavendish Corporation. ISBN 978-0-7614-7677-1.
- Chancey, Mark A (2005). Greco-Roman Culture and the Galilee of Jesus. Cambridge University Press. ISBN 978-0-521-84647-9.
- Chase, Kenneth (2003). Firearms: a Global History to 1700. Cambridge University Press. ISBN 978-0-521-82274-9.
- Crotty, Robert Brian (2017). The Christian Survivor: How Roman Christianity Defeated Its Early Competitors. Springer. p. 25 f.n. 4. ISBN 978-981-10-3214-1. "The Babylonians translated the Hebrew name [Judah] into Aramaic as Yehud Medinata ('the province of Judah') or simply 'Yehud' and made it a new Babylonian province. This was inherited by the Persians. Under the Greeks, Yehud was translated as Judaea and this was taken over by the Romans. After the Jewish rebellion of 135 CE, the Romans renamed the area Syria Palaestina or simply Palestine. The area described by these land titles differed to some extent in the different periods."
- Crouch, C. L. (1 October 2014). Israel and the Assyrians: Deuteronomy, the Succession Treaty of Esarhaddon, and the Nature of Subversion. SBL Press. ISBN 978-1-62837-026-3. "Judah's reason(s) for submitting to Assyrian hegemony, at least superficially, require explanation, while at the same time indications of its read-but-disguised resistance to Assyria must be uncovered... The political and military sprawl of the Assyrian empire during the late Iron Age in the southern Levant, especially toward its outer borders, is not quite akin to the single dominating hegemony envisioned by most discussions of hegemony and subversion. In the case of Judah it should be reiterated that Judah was always a vassal state, semi-autonomous and on the periphery of the imperial system, it was never a fully-integrated provincial territory. The implications of this distinction for Judah's relationship with and experience of the Assyrian empire should not be underestimated; studies of the expression of Assyria's cultural and political powers in its provincial territories and vassal states have revealed notable differences in the degree of active involvement in different types of territories. Indeed, the mechanics of the Assyrian empire were hardly designed for direct control over all its vassals' internal activities, provided that a vassal produced the requisite tribute and did not provoke trouble among its neighbors, the level of direct involvement from Assyria remained relatively low. For the entirety of its experience of the Assyrian empire, Judah functioned as a vassal state, rather than a province under direct Assyrian rule, thereby preserving at least a certain degree of autonomy, especially in its internal affairs. Meanwhile, the general atmosphere of Pax Assyriaca in the southern Levant minimized the necessity of (and opportunities for) external conflict. That Assyrians, at least in small numbers, were present in Judah is likely – probably a qipu and his entourage who, if the recent excavators of Ramat Rahel are correct, perhaps resided just outside the capital – but there is far less evidence than is commonly assumed to suggest that these left a direct impression of Assyria on this small vassal state... The point here is that, despite the wider context of Assyria's political and economic power in the ancient Near East in general and the southern Levant in particular, Judah remained a distinguishable and semi-independent southern Levantine state, part of but not subsumed by the Assyrian empire and, indeed, benefitting from it in significant ways."
- "Cuneiform tablet with part of the Babylonian Chronicle (605-594 BC)". British Museum. n.d. Archived from the original on 30 October 2014.
- DellaPergola, Sergio (2001), "Demography in Israel/Palestine: Trends, Prospects, Policy Implications" (PDF), IUSSP XXIVth General Population Conference in Salvador de Bahia, Brazil, 18–24 August 2001, archived from the original (PDF) on 2 December 2016
- de Miroschedji, Pierre; Sadeq, Moain (2005). "The frontier of Egypt in the Early Bronze Age: preliminary soundings at Tell es-Sakan (Gaza Strip)". In Clarke, Joanne (ed.). Archaeological Perspectives on the Transmission and Transformation of Culture in the Eastern Mediterranean. Council for British Research in the Levant. pp. 155–169. ISBN 978-1-84217-168-4. JSTOR j.ctv310vqks.24.
- Doumani, Beshara (1995). Rediscovering Palestine: merchants and peasants in Jabal Nablus 1700–1900. Berkeley: University of California Press. ISBN 978-0-520-20370-9.
- Drews, Robert (1998), "Canaanites and Philistines", Journal for the Study of the Old Testament, 23 (81): 39–61, doi:10.1177/030908929802308104, S2CID 144074940
- "Early Years of Nebuchadnezzar II (ABC 5)". 1 April 2006. Archived from the original on 5 May 2019.
- Eck, Werner (1999). "The Bar Kokhba Revolt: The Roman Point of View". The Journal of Roman Studies. 89. Society for the Promotion of Roman Studies: 76–89. doi:10.2307/300735. JSTOR 300735.
- Ehrman, B. (2011). Forged: writing in the name of God. HarperCollins. ISBN 978-0-06-207863-6.
- Ember, Melvin; Peregrine, Peter Neal, eds. (2001). Encyclopedia of Prehistory, Vol. 8: South and Southwest Asia (1st ed.). New York and London: Springer. p. 185. ISBN 978-0-306-46262-7.
- Ephal, Israel (2000). "Syria-Palestine under Achaemenid Rule". The Cambridge Ancient History. Vol. 11. Cambridge University Press. pp. 139–. ISBN 978-0-521-22804-6.
- Eshel, Hanan (2008). Dead Sea Scrolls and the Hasmonean State. Studies in the Dead Sea Scrolls and Related Literature (SDSS). Grand Rapids, Michigan/Cambridge and Jerusalem, Israel: William B. Eerdmans and Yad Ben-Zvi Press. ISBN 978-0-8028-6285-3.
- Eshel, Hanan (2006). "The Bar Kochba Revolt, 132–135". In Katz, Steven T. (ed.). The Late Roman-Rabbinic Period. The Cambridge History of Judaism. Vol. 4. Cambridge University Press. pp. 105–127. ISBN 978-0-521-77248-8.
- "Estimated Population in the Palestinian Territory Mid-Year by Governorate, 1997–2016". Palestinian Central Bureau of Statistics. 2016. Archived from the original on 8 June 2014.
- Evenari, Michael (1982). The Negev: The Challenge of a Desert. Harvard University Press. p. 26. ISBN 978-0-674-60672-2. "As the cradle of Christianity, Palestine became the center of religious worship for a vast empire"
- Fahlbusch, Erwin; Lochman, Jan Milic; Bromiley, Geoffrey William; Barrett, David B. (2005). The encyclopedia of Christianity. Grand Rapids: Wm. B. Eerdmans Publishing. ISBN 978-0-8028-2416-5.
- Farsoun, Samih K.; Aruri, Naseer (2006). Palestine and the Palestinians (2nd ed.). Boulder CO: Westview Press. ISBN 978-0-8133-4336-5.
- Feldman, Louis (1990). "Some Observations on the Name of Palestine". Hebrew Union College Annual. 61: 1–23. JSTOR 23508170.
- Feldman, Louis H. (1996) [First published 1990]. "Some Observations on the Name of Palestine". Studies in Hellenistic Judaism. Leiden: Brill. pp. 553–576. ISBN 978-90-04-10418-1.
- Finkelstein, I; Mazar, A.; Schmidt, B. (2007). The Quest for the Historical Israel. Atlanta, GA: Society of Biblical Literature. ISBN 978-1-58983-277-0.
- Finkelstein, Israel; Silberman, Neil Asher (2002). The Bible Unearthed: Archaeology's New Vision of Ancient Israel and the Origin of Its Sacred Texts. Simon & Schuster. ISBN 978-0-684-86912-4.
- Flusin, Bernard (2011). "Palestinia Hagiography (Fourth-Eighth Centuries)". In Efthymiadis, Stephanos (ed.). The Ashgate Research Companion to Byzantine Hagiography. Vol. 1. Ashgate Publishing. ISBN 978-0-7546-5033-1.
- "Full transcript of Abbas speech at UN General Assembly". Haaretz. 23 September 2011. Archived from the original on 24 September 2011.
- Gawerc, Michelle (2012). Prefiguring Peace: Israeli-Palestinian Peacebuilding Partnerships. Lexington Books. p. 44. ISBN 978-0-7391-6610-9.
- Gelber, Yoav (1997). Jewish-Transjordanian Relations 1921–48: alliance of bars sinister. London: Routledge. ISBN 978-0-7146-4675-6.
- "General Assembly Votes Overwhelmingly to Accord Palestine 'Non-Member Observer State' Status in United Nations". United Nations. 2012.
- Gerber, Haim (1998). "Palestine and Other Territorial Concepts in the 17th Century". International Journal of Middle East Studies. 30 (4): 563–572. doi:10.1017/S0020743800052569. S2CID 162982234.
- Gerson, Allan (2012). Israel, the West Bank and International Law. Routledge. p. 285. ISBN 978-0-7146-3091-5.
- Gil, Moshe (1997). A History of Palestine, 634–1099. Cambridge University Press. ISBN 978-0-521-59984-9.
- Gilbar, Gad G. (1986). "The Growing Economic Involvement of Palestine with the West, 1865–1914". In Kushner, David (ed.). Palestine in the Late Ottoman Period: political, social and economic transformation. Brill Academic Publishers. pp. 188–210. ISBN 978-90-04-07792-8.
- Gilbar, Gad G., ed. (1990). Ottoman Palestine: 1800–1914: studies in economic and social history. Brill. ISBN 978-90-04-07785-0.
- Gilbert, Martin (2005). The Routledge Atlas of the Arab-Israeli Conflict. London: Routledge. ISBN 978-0-415-35900-9.
- Goldberg, Michael (2001). Jews and Christians: Getting Our Stories Straight. Wipf and Stock Publishers. ISBN 978-1-57910-776-5.
- Grabbe, Lester L. (2004). A History of the Jews and Judaism in the Second Temple Period: Yehud – A History of the Persian Province of Judah v. 1. T & T Clark. p. 355. ISBN 978-0-567-08998-4.
- Grief, Howard (2008). The Legal Foundation and Borders of Israel Under International Law. Mazo Publishers. ISBN 978-965-7344-52-1.
- Grisanti, Michael A.; Howard, David M. (2003). Giving the Sense: understanding and using Old Testament historical texts (Illustrated ed.). Kregel Publications. ISBN 978-0-8254-2892-0.
- Großer Atlas zur Weltgeschichte [Atlas of World History] (2nd ed.). Braunschweig: Georg Westermann Verlag. 2001. ISBN 978-3-07-509520-1.
- Hajjar, Lisa (2005). Courting Conflict: The Israeli Military Court System in the West Bank and Gaza. University of California Press. p. 96. ISBN 978-0-520-24194-7.
- Hansen, Mogens Herman, ed. (2000). A Comparative Study of Thirty City-state Cultures: an investigation. Copenhagen: Kgl. Danske Videnskabernes Selskab. ISBN 978-87-7876-177-4.
- Harris, David Russell (1996). The Origins and Spread of Agriculture and Pastoralism in Eurasia. London: Routledge. ISBN 978-1-85728-537-6.
- Hayes, John H.; Mandell, Sara R (1998). The Jewish People in Classical Antiquity: from Alexander to Bar Kochba. Louisville KY: Westminster John Knox Press. ISBN 978-0-664-25727-9.
- Herodotus (1858). Rawlinson, George (ed.). The Histories, full text of all books (Book I to Book IX).
- "Herodotus, The Histories, book 3, chapter 91, section 1".
- Hughes, Mark (1999). Allenby and British Strategy in the Middle East, 1917–1919. London: Routledge. ISBN 978-0-7146-4920-7.
- Ingrams, Doreen (1972). Palestine Papers 1917–1922. London: John Murray. ISBN 978-0-8076-0648-3.
- Jacobson, David (1999). "Palestine and Israel". Bulletin of the American Schools of Oriental Research. 313 (313): 65–74. doi:10.2307/1357617. JSTOR 1357617. S2CID 163303829.
- Jacobson, David (2001), "When Palestine Meant Israel", Biblical Archaeology Review, 27 (3)
- "Jews, by Continent of Origin, Continent of Birth & Period of Immigration". Israel Central Bureau of Statistics. 2016.
- Jobling, David; Rose, Catherine (1996). "Reading as a Philistine". In Brett, Mark G. (ed.). Ethnicity and the Bible. BRILL. ISBN 978-0-391-04126-4.
- Johnston, Sarah Iles (2004). Religions of the Ancient World: a guide. Cambridge, MA: Harvard University Press. ISBN 978-0-674-01517-3.
- Joudah, Ahmad Hasan (1987). Revolt in Palestine in the Eighteenth Century: The Era of Shaykh Zahir Al-ʻUmar. Kingston Press. ISBN 978-0-940670-11-2.
- Kaegi, Walter Emil (1995). Byzantium and the Early Islamic Conquests (Reprint, illustrated ed.). Cambridge University Press. ISBN 978-0-521-48455-8.
- Karpat, Kemal H (2002). Studies on Ottoman Social and Political History. Leiden: Brill. ISBN 978-90-04-12101-0.
- Kårtveit, Bård (2014). Dilemmas of Attachment: Identity and Belonging among Palestinian Christians. BRILL. p. 209. ISBN 978-90-04-27639-0. "is widely regarded as the cradle of Christianity"
- Khalidi, Rashid (1997). Palestinian Identity. The Construction of Modern National Consciousness. New York: Columbia University Press. ISBN 978-0-231-10515-6.
- Khalidi, Rashid (2007) [1st ed. 2001]. "The Palestinians and 1948: the underlying causes of failure". In Rogan, Eugene L.; Shlaim, Avi (eds.). The War for Palestine: Rewriting the History of 1948 (2nd ed.). Cambridge University Press. ISBN 978-0-521-69934-1.
- Killebrew, Ann E. (2005). Biblical Peoples and Ethnicity: An Archaeological Study of Egyptians, Canaanites, Philistines and Early Israel 1300–1100 BC. Society of Biblical Literature. ISBN 978-1-58983-097-4.
- Kimmerling, Baruch; Migdal, Joel S (1994). Palestinians: The Making of a People. Cambridge MA: Harvard University Press. ISBN 978-0-674-65223-1.
- Kimmerling, Baruch; Migdal, Joel S. (2003). The Palestinian People: A History. Harvard University Press. ISBN 978-0-674-01129-8.
- Kirk, J Andrew (2011). Civilisations in Conflict?: Islam, the West and Christian Faith. OCMS. ISBN 978-1-870345-87-3.
- Kliot, Nurit (1995), The Evolution of the Egypt-Israel Boundary: From Colonial Foundations to Peaceful Borders, vol. 1, International Boundaries Research Unit, ISBN 978-1-897643-17-4
- Köchler, Hans (1981). The Legal Aspects of the Palestine Problem with Special Regard to the Question of Jerusalem. Vienna: Braumüller. ISBN 978-3-7003-0278-0.
- Krämer, Gudrun (2011). A History of Palestine: From the Ottoman Conquest to the Founding of the State of Israel. Princeton University Press. ISBN 978-0-691-15007-9.
- Kretzmer, David (2012). "The law of belligerent occupation in the Supreme Court of Israel" (PDF). International Review of the Red Cross. 94 (885): 207–236. doi:10.1017/S1816383112000446. S2CID 32105258. SSRN 2657530.
- Kurz, Anat N (2005). Fatah and the Politics of Violence: the institutionalization of a popular Struggle. Brighton: Sussex Academic Press. ISBN 978-1-84519-032-3.
- Lassner, Jacob; Troen, Selwyn Ilan (2007). Jews and Muslims in the Arab world: haunted by pasts real and imagined (Illustrated ed.). Rowman & Littlefield. ISBN 978-0-7425-5842-7.
- Levin, Yigal (24 September 2020). "The Religion of Idumea and Its Relationship to Early Judaism". Religions. 11 (10): 487. doi:10.3390/rel11100487. ISSN 2077-1444.
- Lewin, Ariel (2005). The Archaeology of Ancient Judea and Palestine. Getty Publications. ISBN 978-0-89236-800-6.
- Lewis, Bernard (1954). "Studies in the Ottoman Archives—I". Bulletin of the School of Oriental and African Studies. 16 (3): 469–501. doi:10.1017/s0041977x00086808. S2CID 162304704.
- Lewis, Bernard (1993). Islam in History: ideas, people and events in the Middle East. Chicago: Open Court Publishing. ISBN 978-0-8126-9518-2.
- Loftus, J. P. (1948). "Features of the demography of Palestine". Population Studies. 2: 92–114. doi:10.1080/00324728.1948.10416341.
- Louis, Wm Roger (1969). "The United Kingdom and the Beginning of the Mandates System, 1919–1922". International Organization. 23 (1): 73–96. doi:10.1017/S0020818300025534. S2CID 154745632.
- Macalister, Robert Alexander Stewart; Cook, Stanley Arthur; Hart, John Henry Arthur (1911). "Palestine" . In Chisholm, Hugh (ed.). Encyclopædia Britannica. Vol. 20 (11th ed.). Cambridge University Press. pp. 600–626.
- Magness, Jodi (2012). The Archaeology of the Holy Land: From the Destruction of Solomon's Temple to the Muslim Conquest. Cambridge University Press. ISBN 978-1-139-01383-3.
- Makdisi, Saree (2010). Palestine Inside Out: An Everyday Occupation. W. W. Norton & Company. ISBN 978-0-393-33844-7.
- Malamat, Abraham; Tadmor, Hayim (1976). Ben-Sasson, Haim Hillel (ed.). A History of the Jewish People. Harvard University Press. ISBN 978-0-674-39731-6.
- Mandel, Neville J (1976). The Arabs and Zionism Before World War I. University of California Press. ISBN 978-0-520-02466-3.
- Maniscalco, Fabio (2005). Protection, conservation and valorisation of Palestinian Cultural Patrimony. Massa Publisher. ISBN 978-88-87835-62-5.
- Martindale, John R.; Jones, A.H.M.; Morris, John (1992). The Prosopography of the Later Roman Empire, Volume III: AD 527–641. Cambridge University Press. ISBN 978-0-521-20160-5.
- Masalha, Nur (2007). Invented Traditions, Archaeology and Post-Colonialism in Palestine-Israel. Zed Books. ISBN 978-1-84277-761-9.
- McCarthy, Justin (1990). The Population of Palestine. Columbia University Press. ISBN 978-0-231-07110-9.
- Metz, Helen Chapin, ed. (1989). "Hashemite Kingdom of Jordan". Jordan: A Country Study. GPO for the Library of Congress. ISBN 978-0-16-033746-8.
- Metzer, Jacob (1998). The Divided Economy of Mandatory Palestine. Cambridge Middle East Studies, Series Number 11. Cambridge University Press. ISBN 978-0-521-46550-2.
- Meyers, Eric M.; Chancey, Mark A. (25 September 2012). Alexander to Constantine: Archaeology of the Land of the Bible. Vol. III. Yale University Press. ISBN 978-0-300-14179-5.
- Mills, Watson E (1990). Mercer Dictionary of the Bible. Mercer University Press. ISBN 978-0-86554-373-7.
- Miskin, Maayana (5 December 2012). "PA Weighs 'State of Palestine' Passport". Arutz Sheva. Archived from the original on 7 December 2012. "A senior PA official revealed the plans in an interview with Al-Quds newspaper. The change to 'state' status is important because it shows that 'the state of Palestine is occupied,' he said."
- Morris, Benny (2001) [First published 1999]. Righteous Victims: A History of the Zionist–Arab Conflict, 1881–1999. New York: Alfred A. Knopf. ISBN 978-0-679-74475-7.
- Neusner, J. (1983). "Jews in Iran". In Yarshater, Ehsan (ed.). The Cambridge History of Iran, Volume 3 (2); the Seleucid, Parthian and Sasanian periods. Cambridge University Press. ISBN 978-0-521-24693-4.
- Noth, Martin (1939). "Zur Geschichte des Namens Palästina". Zeitschrift des Deutschen Palästina-Vereins. 62 (1/2). Deutscher Verein zur Erforschung Palästinas: 125–144. JSTOR 27930226.
- O'Mahony, Anthony (2003). "The Christian Communities, religion, politics and church-state relations in Jerusalem: an historical survey". The Christian communities of Jerusalem and the Holy Land: Studies in History, Religion and Politics. University of Wales Press. ISBN 978-0-7083-1772-3.
- "Palestine", Jewish Encyclopedia, Funk & Wagnalls, 1906
- "Palestinians win implicit U.N. recognition of sovereign state". Reuters. 29 November 2012.
- Pappé, Ilan (1994). "Introduction". The Making of the Arab–Israeli Conflict, 1947–1951. I.B.Tauris. ISBN 978-1-85043-819-9.
- Pappe, Ilan (1999). The Israel/Palestine Question. Taylor & Francis. ISBN 978-0-415-16948-6.
- Pastor, Jack (1997). Land and Economy in Ancient Palestine. London: Routledge. ISBN 978-0-415-15960-9.
- Phillipp, Thomas (2013). Acre: The Rise and Fall of a Palestinian City, 1730–1831. Columbia University Press. ISBN 978-0-231-50603-8.
- "Population, by Population Group". Israel Central Bureau of Statistics. 2016.
- Porath, Yehoshua (1974). The Emergence of the Palestinian-Arab National Movement, 1918–1929. London: Frank Cass. ISBN 978-0-7146-2939-1.
- Redmount, Carol A (1999). "Bitter Lives: Israel in and out of Egypt". In Coogan, Michael D. (ed.). The Oxford History of the Biblical World. Oxford University Press. ISBN 978-0-19-508707-9.
- Robinson, Edward (1865). Physical geography of the Holy Land. Boston: Crocker & Brewster.
- Rogan, Eugene L (2002). Frontiers of the State in the Late Ottoman Empire: Transjordan, 1850–1921. Cambridge University Press. ISBN 978-0-521-89223-0.
- Room, Adrian (2006). Placenames of the World: origins and meanings of the names for 6,600 countries, cities, territories, natural features, and historic sites (2nd, illustrated ed.). McFarland. ISBN 978-0-7864-2248-7.
- Rosen, Steven A (1997). Lithics After the Stone Age: a handbook of stone tools from the Levant. Rowman Altamira. ISBN 978-0-7619-9124-3.
- Sachar, Howard M. (2006). A History of Israel: from the rise of Zionism to our time (2nd ed.). Alfred A. Knopf. ISBN 978-0-679-76563-9.
- Said, Edward (2003). Culture and Resistance: Conversations with Edward W. Said. Pluto Press. p. 33. ISBN 978-0-7453-2017-5.
- Said, Edward; Hitchens, Christopher (2001). Blaming the Victims: spurious scholarship and the Palestinian Question. Verso. ISBN 978-1-85984-340-6.
- Saldarini, Anthony (1994). Matthew's Christian-Jewish Community. University of Chicago Press. ISBN 978-0-226-73421-7.
- Salibi, Kamal Suleiman (1993). The Modern History of Jordan. I.B.Tauris. pp. 17–18. ISBN 978-1-86064-331-6.
- Sanger, Andrew (2011). "The Contemporary Law of Blockade and the Gaza Freedom Flotilla". In Schmitt, M.N.; Arimatsu, Louise; McCormack, Tim (eds.). Yearbook of International Humanitarian Law - 2010. Vol. 13. p. 429. doi:10.1007/978-90-6704-811-8_14. ISBN 978-90-6704-811-8.
- Schäfer, Peter (2003). The History of the Jews in the Greco-Roman World. Psychology Press. ISBN 978-0-415-30585-3.
- Schiller, Jon (2009). Internet View of the Arabic World. PublishAmerica. ISBN 978-1-4392-6326-6.
- Schlor, Joachim (1999). Tel Aviv: From Dream to City. Reaktion Books. ISBN 978-1-86189-033-7.
- Schmelz, Uziel O. (1990). "Population Characteristics of Jerusalem and Hebron Regions According to Ottoman Census of 1905". In Gilbar, Gar G (ed.). Ottoman Palestine: 1800–1914. Leiden: Brill. ISBN 978-90-04-07785-0.
- Schölch, Alexander (1985). "The Demographic Development of Palestine 1850–1882". International Journal of Middle East Studies. XII (4): 485–505. doi:10.1017/S0020743800029445. JSTOR 00207438. S2CID 154921401.
- Schrader, Eberhard (1878). Keilinschriften und Geschichtsforschung ("KGF", in English "Cuneiform inscriptions and Historical Research") (in German). J. Ricker'sche Buchhandlung – via Internet Archive.
- Schwartz, Seth (2016). "The Impact of the Jewish Rebellions, 66–135 CE: Destruction or Provincialization?". In Collins, John J.; Manning, J.G. (eds.). Revolt and Resistance in the Ancient Classical World and the Near East. Culture and History of the Ancient Near East. Vol. 85. Brill. pp. 234–252. doi:10.1163/9789004330184_016. ISBN 978-90-04-33018-4.
- Scobbie, Iain (2012). Wilmshurst, Elizabeth (ed.). International Law and the Classification of Conflicts. Oxford University Press. p. 295. ISBN 978-0-19-965775-9.
- Segev, Tom (2001) [Original in 2000]. "Nebi Musa, 1920". One Palestine, Complete: Jews and Arabs Under the British Mandate. Trans. Haim Watzman. London: Henry Holt and Company. ISBN 978-0-8050-6587-9.
- Setton, Kenneth, ed. (1969). A History of the Crusades. University of Wisconsin Press. In six volumes: The first hundred years (2nd ed. 1969); The later Crusades, 1189–1311 (1969); The fourteenth and fifteenth centuries (1975); The art and architecture of the crusader states (1977); The impact of the Crusades on the Near East (1985); The impact of the Crusades on Europe (1989)
- Shahin, Mariam (2005). Palestine: a Guide. Interlink Books. ISBN 978-1-56656-557-8.
- Shapira, Anita (2014). Israel a history, translated from Hebrew by Anthony Berris. London: Weidenfeld and Nicolson. p. 15. ISBN 978-1-61168-352-3.
- Sharon, Moshe (1988). The Holy Land in History and Thought: papers submitted to the International Conference on the Relations between the Holy Land and the World Outside It, Johannesburg, 1986. Brill Archive. ISBN 978-90-04-08855-9.
- Shiloh, Yigal (1980). "The Population of Iron Age Palestine in the Light of a Sample Analysis of Urban Plans, Areas, and Population Density". Bulletin of the American Schools of Oriental Research. 239 (239): 25–35. doi:10.2307/1356754. JSTOR 1356754. S2CID 163824693.
- Sicker, Martin (1999). Reshaping Palestine: from Muhammad Ali to the British Mandate, 1831–1922. New York: Praeger/Greenwood. ISBN 978-0-275-96639-3.
- Silverburg, Sanford R. (2009). "Diplomatic Recognition of States in statu nascendi: The Case of Palestine". In Silverburg, Sanford R. (ed.). Palestine and International Law: Essays on Politics and Economics. Diplomatic Recognition of States. ISBN 978-0-7864-4248-5.
- Sivan, Hagith (2008). Palestine in Late Antiquity. Oxford University Press. p. 2. ISBN 978-0-19-160867-4.
- Smith, Morton (1999). "The Gentiles in Judaism". Cambridge History of Judaism. Vol. 3. CUP. p. 210. ISBN 978-0-521-24377-3.
- "State of Palestine name change shows limitations". AP. 17 January 2013. Archived from the original on 10 January 2013. "Israel remains in charge of territories the world says should one day make up that state."
- Tamari, Salim (2011). "Shifting Ottoman Conceptions of Palestine-Part 1: Filistin Risalesi and the two Jamals" (PDF). Jerusalem Quarterly (49): 28–37. doi:10.70190/jq.I47.p28.
- Taylor, Joan E. (15 November 2012). The Essenes, the Scrolls, and the Dead Sea. Oxford University Press. ISBN 978-0-19-955448-5. "Up until this date the Bar Kokhba documents indicate that towns, villages and ports where Jews lived were busy with industry and activity. Afterwards there is an eerie silence, and the archaeological record testifies to little Jewish presence until the Byzantine era, in En Gedi. This picture coheres with what we have already determined in Part I of this study, that the crucial date for what can only be described as genocide, and the devastation of Jews and Judaism within central Judea, was 135 CE and not, as usually assumed, 70 CE, despite the siege of Jerusalem and the Temple's destruction"
- "Temple of Jerusalem | Description, History, & Significance | Britannica".
- Tessler, Mark (1994). A History of the Israeli-Palestinian Conflict. Indiana University Press. ISBN 978-0-253-20873-6.
- Tucker, Spencer C.; Roberts, Priscilla, eds. (2008). The Encyclopedia of the Arab-Israeli Conflict: A Political, Social, and Military History. ABC-CLIO. p. 1553. ISBN 978-1-85109-842-2.
- UN News Centre (2012). "Lack of sufficient services in Gaza could get worse without urgent action, UN warns". UN Publications.
- Vermes, Géza (2014). The True Herod. Bloomsbury. ISBN 978-0-567-48841-1.
- Walmsley, Alan (2000). "Production, exchange and regional trade in the Islamic Wast Mediterranean: old structures, new systems?". In Hansen, Inge Lyse; Wickham, Chris (eds.). The Long Eighth Century: Production, Distribution and Demand. BRILL. ISBN 978-90-04-11723-5.
- Weill, Sharon (2014). The Role of National Courts in Applying International Humanitarian Law. Oxford University Press. p. 22. ISBN 978-0-19-968542-4.
- Wenning, Robert (2007). "The Nabataeans in History (Before AD 106)". In Politis, Konstantinos D (ed.). The World of the Nabataeans: Volume 2 of the International Conference the World of the Herods and the Nabataeans Held at the British Museum, 17–19 April, 2001. Oriens Et Occidens. Wiesbaden: Franz Steiner Verlag. ISBN 978-3-515-08816-9.
- Whitelam, Keith W. (1996). The Invention of Ancient Israel: The Silencing of Palestinian History. Routledge. ISBN 978-1-317-79916-0.
- Yazbak, Mahmoud (1998). Haifa in the Late Ottoman Period, A Muslim Town in Transition, 1864–1914. Brill Academic Pub. ISBN 978-90-04-11051-9.
- Zeevi, Dror (1996), An Ottoman century: the district of Jerusalem in the 1600s, SUNY Press, ISBN 978-0-7914-2915-0
