= Leo Schrader =

American politician (1938–2011)

Leo W. Schrader

Member of the Missouri House of Representatives

Personal details
- Born: October 25, 1938 Joplin, Missouri
- Died: January 1, 2011 (aged 72) Florida
- Party: Democratic
- Spouse: Cean G. Carter (m. 1960)
- Children: 2 daughters
- Occupation: attorney, Army officer

Leo W. Schrader (October 25, 1938 – January 1, 2011) was an American politician who served in the Missouri House of Representatives. He was first elected to the Missouri House of Representatives in 1968. Schrader was educated at the University of Arkansas and the University of Missouri-Columbia. He previously served as a captain in the U.S. Army Reserves and between 1965 and 1966 as assistant prosecuting attorney for Jasper County, Missouri. In 1984, he moved to St. Petersburg, Florida. He was a practicing attorney in both Missouri and Florida for 47 years.
