= Eberhard Schrader =

German orientalist (1836–1908)

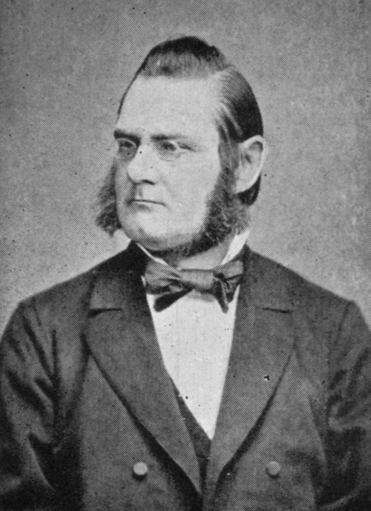
Eberhard Schrader, about the 1880s

Eberhard Schrader (7 January 1836 – 4 July 1908) was a German orientalist primarily known for his achievements in Assyriology.

== Biography ==
Schrader was born at Braunschweig, and educated at the University of Göttingen under Ewald. In 1858 he won a university prize for a treatise on the Ethiopian languages, and in 1863 became professor of theology at the University of Zürich. Subsequently, he occupied chairs at Giessen (1870) and Jena (1873), and finally became professor of Oriental languages at the Friedrich Wilhelm University, Berlin in 1878. Although he engaged initially in biblical research, his chief achievements were in the field of Assyriology, in which he was a pioneer in Germany and acquired an international reputation. He died in Berlin in 1908 and he was buried at the Stahnsdorf South-Western Cemetery.

== Works ==
His publications include:

- Studien zur Kritik und Erklärung der biblischen Urgeschichte (1863).
- Wilhelm Martin Leberecht de Wette's Einleitung in das Alte Testament, 8th edition (1869).
- Die assyrisch-babylonischen keilinschriften (1872).
- Die keilinschriften und das Alte Testament (1872; 3rd edition by Heinrich Zimmern and Hugo Winckler, 1901–02).
- Keilinschriften und Geschichtsforschung (1878). online
- Die Höllenfahrt der Istar (text, trans., notes, 1874).
- Die Namen der Meere in den assyrischen Inschriften, Berlin 1878 (online)
- Zur Frage nach dem Ursprung der altbabylonischen Kultur (1884).
- Keilinschriftliche Bibliothek, in conjunction with scholars Ludwig Abel, Carl Bezold, Peter Christian Albrecht Jensen, Felix Ernst Peiser and Hugo Winckler (1889).
