= List of compositions by Carl Loewe =

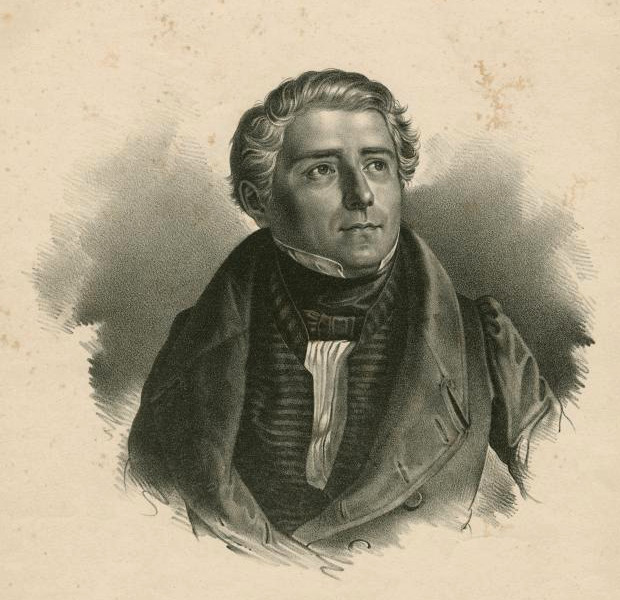
Carl Loewe

This is a list of compositions by Carl Loewe.

== Piano ==
=== Piano solo ===
- Abendfantasie, Op. 11 [1817]
- Grande Sonate in E major, Op. 16 [1829]
- Mazeppa: Ballade without Words, Op. 27 [1828]
- Der barmherzige Bruder, Op. 28 [1830]
- Grande Sonate élégiaque in F minor, Op. 32
- Grande Sonate brillante in E♭ major, Op. 41 [1819]
- Le Printemps: Tone Poem in Sonata Form, Op. 47 [1824]
  1. Der erwachende Morgen: Morgenfeier (L'aube du jour)
  2. Naturleben (Grand jour)
  3. Scherzo: Gang zu landlischen Gruppen (Vie Champetre)
  4. Tagesneigen (Le Crepuscule)
- Alpenfantasie, Op. 53 [1835]
- Kleiner Haushalt: Lyric Fantasy, Op. 71 (ver. for solo piano)
- Biblische Bilder, Op. 96 [1844]
  1. Bethesda
  2. Gang nach Emaus
  3. Martha un Maria
- Zigeuner-Sonate, Op. 107b [1847]
  1. Waldscene
  2. Indisches Märchen
  3. Tanz
  4. Abendcultus
  5. Aufbruch am Morgen
- Phantasien, Op. 137
  1. Der Abscheid des Auswanderers
  2. Meerfahrt
  3. Die neue Heimath
  4. Die Prairie

=== Piano, four hands ===
- Grosses Duo, Op. 18

== Chamber Music ==
=== Piano trio ===
- Grand Trio in G minor, Op. 12 [1821, pub. 1830] (Note: new edition by Cord Garden in 2018)

=== String quartet ===
- Three String Quartets, Op. 24 [1821]
  1. String Quartet in G major
  2. String Quartet in F major
  3. String Quartet in B♭ major
- String Quartet in C minor 'Quatuor spirituel', Op. 26 [1830]
  1. After Psalm 77:2-10
  2. Media vita summus in morte (on an old cantus firmus that was already known before the reformation)
  3. After Isaiah 41:10 and 43:1
  4. After Psalm 91:7

=== Violin and piano ===
- Grand Duo, Op. 90

=== Clarinet and piano ===
- Schottische Bilder, Op. 112 [ca. 1847]
  1. Die Jungfrau vom See
  2. Der Wanderer auf Bothwell-Castle
  3. Der Schottenclan

=== Viola and piano ===
- Duo Espagnôla [sic] (1857, pub. by Cord Garden in 2018)

== Concert Music ==
=== Symphonies ===
- Symphony in E minor (1834, in manuscript, pub. by Cord Garden in 2018)
- Symphony in D minor (ca.1835, in manuscript, pub. by Cord Garden in 2018)

=== Piano and orchestra ===
- Piano Concerto in E minor
- Piano Concerto in A major (ca.1830, in manuscript, pub. by Cord Garden in 2018)

=== Vocal ===
- Hallelujah [1815, unpublished]
- Der Freidhof: A Dirge (for tenor, chorus and string orchestra with trumpets) [1824, unpublished]
- Der Gang nach dem Eisenhammer ("with the retention of B.A. Weber's melodramatic instrumental music", for solo voice and orchestra), Op. 17 [1829, pub. 1832]
- Die Nächtliche Heerschau (La revue nocturne) (for solo voice and orchestra), Op. 23 [1832, pub. 1833]
- Die erste Walpurgisnacht (Ballade for soloists, chorus and orchestra), Op. 25 [1833]
- Scholastica (for alto voice with chorus and orchestra), Op. 75 H.2 No. 2 [1838]
- Der Bergmann (for solo voice, chorus and orchestra) [1839]
- Te Deum, Op. 77 [pub. Berlin, 1842]
- Die Hochzeit der Thetis: Cantata, Op. 120
- Kleine Passionmusik (for chorus, strings and organ) [?, unpublished]

== Oratorios ==
- Die Zestörung von Jerusalem, Op. 30 (Grand Oratorio in 2 parts) (G. Nicolai), [1829, pub. Leipzig, 1821] (perf. in Stettin, 1829)
- Die eherne Schlange, Op. 40 (Vocal oratorio for men's voices) (Ludwig Giesebrecht), [1834, pub. Berlin, 1834]
  - Additional bass aria, "Sang des Moses" [composed 1857]
- Die sieben Schläfer, Op. 46 (Oratorio in 3 parts) (Giesebrecht), [1833, pub. Mainz, 1835]
- Die Apostel von Philippi, Op. 48 (Vocal oratorio for men's voices) (Giesebrecht), [1835, pub. Berlin, 1835]
- Gutenberg, Op. 55 (Oratorio in 3 parts) (Note: Written for the unveiling of the Gutenberg monument in Mainz) (Giesebrecht), [1836, pub. Mainz, 1836]
- Die Festzeiten, Op. 66 (Spiritual Oratorio in 3 parts, Bible: John), [1825–36, pub. Mainz, 1842]
- Palestrina (Giesebrecht) [1841]
- Johann Hus, Op. 82 (Oratorio in 3 parts) (A. Zeune), [1842, pub. Berlin, 1842]
- Der Meister von Avis (Ludwig Giesebrecht) [1843]
- Das Sühnopfer des neuen Bundes, (Passion Oratorio) (von Telschow) [1847]
- Hiob (Job) (von Telschow) [1848]
- Das hohe Lied von Salomonis (Giesebrecht) [1859]
- Polus von Atella (Giesebrecht) [1860]
- Die Heilung des Blindgeborenen, Op. 131 (Vocal oratorio in 4 parts with piano or organ, Bible: John 9), [pub. Magdeburg, 1860]
- Die Auferweckung des Lazarus, Op. 132 (Vocal oratorio in 3 parts with piano or organ, Bible: John 11), [pub. Brunswick, 1863]
- Johannes der Täufer (Gospels) [1862]
- Der Segen von Assisi [unfinished]

== Stage Music ==
=== Opera ===
- Die Alpenhütte (The Alpine Cabin), singspiel, 1 act (August von Kotzebue) [first perf. 1816, Berlin]
- Rudolf der deutsche Herr (Rudolph, the German Lord), grand romantic opera, 3 acts (Loewe and Vocke) [1825, unperformed]
- Malekadhel (Malek-Adhel), grand tragic opera, 3 acts (Caroline Pichler, after The Talisman by Walter Scott) [first perf. 1832, Berlin]
- Neckereien (Teasing), comic opera, 3 acts, E.A. Mühlbach), 1833 [unperformed]
- Die drei Wünsche (The Three Wishes): Singspiel in 3 acts, Op. 42 (Ernst Raupach) [first perf. 2 or 18 Feb 1834, Berlin, Schauspielhaus]
- Emmy, romantic opera, 3 acts (Franz Ludwig Melzer and Fr. von Hauser, after Kenilworth by Walter Scott) [1842, unperformed]

=== Incidental music ===
- Das Märchen im Traum (Ernst Raupach), (includes Overture in D minor) [1832?]

== Church Music ==
=== Collections ===
- Liturgie (for the Protestant Church service) [1847]
- Musikalischer Gottesdienst... [pub. late 1850s?] (Note: Full title: "Musical Church Service, or Instructions for everything that is required of cantors and organists in the Protestant Church. Also a complete chorale book with preludes, postludes and interludes.")
- Choralbuch...[?, unpublished] (Note: Full title: "Chorale book, containing all the melodies for the songs in Bollhagen's hymn book, which previously had no melody and therefore had to be sung with their own melody, arranged for cantors and organists by the music director Dr. Loewe")

=== Individual pieces ===
- Easter Cantata [1820?, unpublished]
- Festgesänge [1847, pub. in H. Priem's Chorales, Songs of the Liturgy, and Celebratory Songs for Primary Schools... 1847]
  - "Laßt uns mit ehrfurchtvollem Dank": Christmas song
  - "Wunderbarer Gnedenthron": Christmas song
  - Der Siegesfürst: Easter song
  - Unsere Aufestehung durch Christum
  - "Dich bet'ich an, erstand'ner Held"
- Einsegnungslied (Consecration song for men's chorus)
- Abendmahlslied (Communion song for three-part children's chorus with organ) [pub. in Jakob Neus's First collection of part-songs...]
- "Freide und Ruhe in Gott" (for the evening before All Souls Day, for voice and organ) [pub. 1854-1862?]

== Music for the Prussian Royal Court and Military ==
- Patriotic Fest-Cantata [1815?]
- Heldenthum und Liebe (Fest-Hymn for soloists, chorus and large orchestra) [1823]
- Prussian Military Ballads, Op. 61 (for voice and piano, for 4 men's voices, or for men's choir and military band) [1837, pub. 1838]
  1. Fridericus Rex
  2. General Schwerin
- Zumalacarregui: Spanish Romance (for men's choir and military band) (Note: Written for the choir of the Crown Prince's Grenadier Regiments) [1837]
- Des Königs Zuversicht: Prussian Folk Song (for 4 men's voices, or for voice and piano), Op. 118a [1839]
- A Prussian Song (for a capella men's chorus, or for solo voice, chorus, and piano) [1840]
- 2 Vaterlandslieder (for a capella chorus) [?, pub. w/o opus 1841]
  - Preussens Huldigung
  - Der deutsche Rhein
- Deutsche Flotte: Folk Song (for 4 men's voices) [1848]
- Prussian Hurrah Song (for a capella men's chorus, or for voice and piano) [1848]
- Preussentreue: Prussian Folk Song (for voice and piano) [1848 or 1849]
- Fest-Cantata for the silver wedding celebration of their majesties, the King and Queen of Prussia [1848?]
- Cantata for the reception of the King after the year of the revolution [1850]
- Salvum fac regum (for a 4 men's voices, or for voice and piano) [1850]
- "Bitte zu Gott um Frieden" (Sacred song composed for the King's birthday, for voice and piano) [1854]
- Prussian Naval Song [1856]
- Dem König (for a capella chorus) [1859]
- Dem Herrscher [1859]
- König Wilhelm: Prussian Folk Hymn (for a capella men's chorus, for a 3-part soldiers' chorus, or for voice and piano), Op. 139 [1861]
- Prayers (for SATB voices) (Note: Composed to King Friedrich Wilhelm's IV adaptations of Aurelius Augustius's Confessions)
  - "Wie du deine Sonne hast lassen aufgehn"
  - "Her Gott, der du bist!"

== Balladen, Lieder, Gesänge, Legenden, etc. ==
=== Solo Voice and Piano ===
- 3 Ballades, Op. 1 [pub. 1823]
  1. Edward [1818]
  2. Der Wirthin Töchterlein [1823]
  3. Erlkönig [1818]
- 3 Ballades, Op. 2 [pub. 1824]
  1. Treuröschen [1819]
  2. Herr Oluf [1821]
  3. Walpurgisnacht (Die Hexe) [1824]
- 3 Ballades, Op. 3 [pub. 1825]
  1. Abschied (Comitat) [1825]
  2. Elvershöh: Danish Ballad [1820]
  3. Die Drei Lieder (König Sifrid) [1825]
- Hebrew Melodies of Byron
  - Book I, Op.4 [1823, pub. 1825]
    1. Herodes Klage um Marianne
    2. An den Wassern zu Babel
    3. "Wär' ich wirklich so falsch?"
    4. Alles ist eitel, spricht der Prediger
    5. Todtenklage
    6. Thränen und Lächeln
  - Book II, Op. 5 [1824, pub. 1826]
    1. "Sie geht in Schönheit"
    2. Jephta’s Tochter
    3. Die wilde Gazelle
    4. Weint um Israel
    5. "Mein Geist Ist Trub"
    6. Saul vor seiner letzten Schlacht
- Wallhaide, Op. 6 [1817-1819, publ. 1826]
- 2 Ballades, Op. 7 [pub. 1826]
  1. Der große Kurfürst und die Spreejungfrau [1826]
  2. Der Spate Gast [1825]
- 2 Ballades, Op. 8 [pub. 1827]
  1. Goldschmieds Töchterlein [1827]
  2. Der Mutter Geist [1824]
- Collected Lieder, Gesänge, Romances and Ballades, Op. 9 [Bk. I-VI pub. 1828, Bk. VII-X published separately]
  - Book I, Nachtgesänge
    1. Die Lotosblume [1828]
    2. Der König auf dem Thurme [1828]
    3. (a) Wandrers Nachtlied I [1817]
      (b) Wandrers Nachtlied II [1828]
    4. Geisterleben [1819]
    5. Die Elfenkönigin [1824]
  - Book II, Nachtgesänge
    1. Todtengräberlied (from Hamlet) [1827]
    2. Lied der Desdemona (from Othello) [1827]
    3. Die Abgeschiedenen: Serenata [1824]
    4. Das Ständchen [1826]
    5. Die Jungfrau und der Tod: Scene eines Totentanzes [1827]
  - Book III, Gesänge der Sehnsucht
    1. "Ich denke dein" (1st setting) [1817]
    2. "Meine Ruh' ist hin" (from Faust I) [1822]
    3. "Wie der Tag mir schleichet" [1817]
    4. Der Treuergebene [1817]
    5. Sehnsucht [1818] (from Goethe's Wilhelm Meisters Lehrjahre)
  - Book IV, Gesänge der Sehnsucht
    1. "Wenn du wärst mein eigen" [1819]
    2. Abschied [1819]
    3. Fruhlingserwachen [1819]
    4. Ihr Spaziergang [1819]
    5. Graf Eberhards Weißdorn: Romantische Legende [1825]
  - Book V, Heitere Gesänge
    1. Minnelied [1819]
    2. Hans und Grete [1824]
    3. Bauernregel [1824]
    4. Die Zufriedenen [1824]
    5. An die fleissige Spinnerin [1819]
  - Book VI, Heitere Gesänge
    1. Wach auf! [1824]
    2. Liebesgedanken [1823]
    3. Vogelgesang [1828]
    4. Mädchen sind wie der Wind [1818]
    5. Graf Eberstein [1826]
  - Book VII, 6 Poems [1832, pub. 1832]
    1. Der Pilgrim von St. Just
    2. "Im Traum sah ich die Geliebte"
    3. Erste Liebe
    4. Neuer Frühling
    5. Du schönes Fischermädchen
    6. "Ich hab' im Traume geweinet"
  - Book VIII, 5 Posthumous Poems of Goethe [1833, pub. 1834]
    1. Thurmwächter Lynceus zu den Füssen der Helena (from Faust II)
    2. Lynceus, der Helena seine Schätze darbietend (from Faust II)
    3. Lynceus, der Thürmer, auf Faust's Sternwarte singend (from Faust II)
    4. Mädchenwünsche
    5. Gutmann und Gutweib (from the Old Scottish)
  - Book IX, 6 Lieder [1835-1836, pub. 1836]
    1. Gretchens Szene im Zwinger (from Faust I)
    2. Der alte Goethe
    3. Die verliebte Schäferin Scapine
    4. Εισ Αφροδιτην (An Aphrodite: Ode of Sappho)
    5. Εισ Τεττιγα (An die Grille: Ode of Anakreon)
    6. Die Fernen
  - Book X, 6 Lieder [1838, pub. 1839]
    1. Jugend und Alter
    2. Die Sylphide
    3. Der Bräutigam
    4. Niemand hat's gesehn
    5. Einrichtung
    6. Der Aptotheker als Nebenbuhler
- Bilder des Orients of H. Stieglitz, Op. 10 [1833, pub. 1834]
  - 1st Wreath: Wanderbilder aus Arabien
    - Melek und Maisuna: Arabian Song Cycle
      1. Die Geister der Wüste, Bk.I,1
      2. Der verschmachtende pilger, Bk.I,2
      3. Melek in der Wüste, Bk.I,3
      4. Die Oasis, Bk.I,4
      5. Lied eines Vögeleins in der Oasis, Bk.I,5
      6. Melek am Quell, Bk.I,6
      7. Maisuna am Brunnen, Bk.II,1:
  - 2nd Wreath: Bilder der Heimath aus Persien
    - Ali und Fatme, Bk.II,2
    - Assad und Gulhind: Persian Song Cycle
      1. Assad mit dem Selam, Bk.II,3
      2. Taubenpost, Bk.II,4
      3. Gulhinde am Putztische, BK.II,5
      4. Abendgesang, Bk.II,6
- Hebrew Melodies of Byron
  - Book III, Op. 13 [1825, pub 1826]
    1. Sanheribs Niederlage (Kings II, 19)
    2. Belsazars Gesicht (Daniel, 5)
    3. Die höh're Welt (for solo piano or for 4 voices)
    4. Jordans Ufer
    5. "Wohin, o Seele wirst du eilen?"
    6. Die Sonne Der Schlaflosen
  - Book IV, Op. 14 [1826, pub. 1827]
    1. Saul und Samuel (Samuel I, 28)
    2. Eliphas' Gesicht (Job, 4:13-21)
    3. Davids Harfe (for solo piano or for 4 voices)
    4. Saul
    5. Jerusalems Zerstörung durch Titus
- Serbian Folk Songs, Op. 15 [1824, pub. 1825]
  1. Mädchen und Rose
  2. Beim Tanz
  3. Überraschung
  4. Des Jünglings Segen
  5. Liebesliedchen
  6. Kapitulation
- Der Gang nach dem Eisenhammer ("with the retention of B.A. Weber's melodramatic instrumental music"), Op. 17 [1829, pub. 1832]
- 3 Goethe Ballades, Op. 20 [1832]
  1. Hochzeitslied
  2. Der Zauberlehrling
  3. Die wandelnde Glocke
- Die Gruft der Liebenden, Op. 21 [1832]
- Geistliche Gesänge, Op. 22 [pub. 1833]
  - Book I
    1. "Wenn ich ihn nur habe"
    2. "Wenn alle untreu werden"
    3. Der Hirten Lied am Kripplein
    4. Bussleid
    5. "Gottes ist der Orient!"
  - Book II
    1. "Werfet alle eure Sorgen auf ihn!"
    2. Engelsstimmen am Krankenbette
    3. Der nahe Retter
    4. "Wie gross ist des Allmächt'gen Güte!"
    5. "Ave Maris stella!"_"Meerstern! ich dich grüsse"
- Die Nächtliche Heerschau (La revue nocturne), Op. 23 [1832, pub. 1833]
- Die Braut Von Corinth, Op. 29 [1830]
- Legends [Composed 1834]
  - 1st Collection, Op. 33 [pub. 1834]
    1. Jungfrau Lorenz: Tangermündish Legend
    2. Das heilige Haus in Loretto
    3. Des Fremden Kindes Heiliger Christ
  - 2nd Collection: Der grosse Christoph, Op. 34 [pub. 1834]
  - 3rd Collection, Op. 35 [pub. 1834]
    1. St. Johannes und das Würmlein (Johanneswürmlein)
    2. Johann von Nepomuk
  - 4th Collection, Op. 36 [pub. 1834]
    1. Maria Und Das Milchmadchen
    2. Sankt Mariens Ritter
    3. Der ewige Jude
  - 5th Collection, Op. 37 [pub. 1836]
    1. Das Muttergottesbild im Teiche
    2. Moosröslein (for alto)
    3. Das Paradies in der Wüste (for tenor and men's chorus)
  - Gregor auf dem Stein: Legend in 5 Scenes, Op. 38 [pub. 1836]
    1. “Herolde ritten von Ort zu Ort”
    2. “Im Schloß, da brennen der Kerzen viel”
    3. “Der junge König und sein Gemahl”
    4. “Ein Klippeneiland liegt im Meer”
    5. “Wie bräutlich glänzt das heilige Rom”
- Der Bergmann: A Song Cycle in Ballad Form in 5 Scenes by Giesebrecht, Op. 39 [1839, pub. 1839]
  1. “Im Schacht der Adern und der Stufen”
  2. “Von meines Hauses engen Wänden”
  3. “Unser Herzog hat herrliche Taten vollbracht”
  4. “Es steht ein Kelch in der Kapelle”
  5. “Als Weibesarm in jungen Jahren”
- 3 Ballades, Op. 43 [1835, pub. 1835]
  1. Der Fischer
  2. Der Räuber
  3. Das Nussbraune Mädchen
- 3 Goethe Ballades, Op. 44 [1835]
  1. Ballade vom Vertriebenen und zurüchkehrenden Grafen (Der Bettler)
  2. Der getreue Eckart
  3. Der Totentanz
- Harald und Mahadoch: 2 Ballades, Op. 45 [1835]
  1. Harald
  2. Der Gott und die Bajadere: Indische Legende
- Polish Ballades of A. Mickiewicz [1835]
  - Book I, Op. 49
    1. Der Woywode (Czaty): Ukrainian Ballad
    2. Die Schlüsselblum (Piérwiosnek)
    3. Die drei Budrisse (Trzech Badrysów): Lithuanian Ballad
  - Book II, Op. 50
    1. Wilia und das Mädchen (Wilija i dziewica)
    2. Der junge Herr und das Mädchen (Panicz i sziewczyna)
  - Book III, Op. 51
    1. Das Switesmädchen (Świtezianka)
    2. Frau Twardowska (Pani Twardowska)
- Esther: A Song Cycle in Ballad Form by L. Giesebrecht, Op. 52 [1835, pub. 1836]
  1. "Wie früh das enge Pförtchen knarre"
  2. "Der König auf dem gold'nen Stuhle"
  3. "Nun auf dem fremden Boden mehret'
  4. "Spielt, Mägdlein, unter euer Weide"
  5. "Wie wohnst du in des Reiches Städten"
- Der Sturm von Alhama: Spanish Ballad, Op. 54 [1834, pub. 1835]
- 3 Ballades of J. N. Vogl, Op. 56 [1836, pub. 1836]
  1. Heinrich der Vogler
  2. Der Gesang
  3. Urgrossvaters Gesellschaft
- Goethe's Paria: Indian Legend, Op. 58 [1839]
  1. Gebet des Paria
  2. Legende
  3. Dank des Paria
- 3 Goethe Ballades, Op. 59 [1836, pub. 1837]
  1. Wirkung in die Ferne
  2. Der Sänger
  3. Der Schatzgräber
- Frauenliebe: A Song Wreath by Chamisso (for alto voice), Op. 60 [1836]
  1. “Seit Ich Ihn Gesehen”
  2. “Er, Der Herrlichste Von Allen”
  3. “Ich Kann's Nicht Fassen, Nicht Glauben”
  4. “Du Ring An Meinem Finger”
  5. “Helft Mir, Ihr Schwestern”
  6. “Süßer Freund, Du Blickest Mich verwundert An”
  7. “An Meinem Herzen, An Meiner Brust”
  8. “Nun Hast Du Mir Den Ersten Schmerz Getan”
  9. “Traum Der Eignen Tage”
- 2 Prussian Military Ballads von W. Alexis, Op. 61 [1837, pub. 1838]
  1. Fridericus Rex
  2. General Schwerin
- Rückert's Poems: Two Song Cycles, Op. 62 [1837]
  - Book I
    1. Zeislein
    2. Bescheidung
    3. O Susse Mutter
    4. Süßes Begräbnis
    5. Hinkende Jamben
    6. Irrlichter
  - Book II
    7. Abendlied
    8. In der Kirche
    9. Ich und mein Gevatter
    10. Die Pfarrjungferchen
    11. Kind und Mädchen
    12. Die Blume der Ergebung
- 2 Gesänge of R. Marggraff, Op. 63 [1837, pub. 1838]
  1. Die Schneeflock
  2. Der Lappländer
- 4 Fabellieder, Op. 64 [1837, pub. 1839]
  - Book I: Der verliebte Maikäfer: Animal Ballad, Humoreske
  - Book II
    1. Der Kuckuck: Fable Song
    2. Die Katzenkönigin: Fable Ballad
    3. Wer ist Bär?: Fable Ballad
- 3 Ballades of J.N. Vogl, Op. 65 [1837, pub. 1838]
  - Das vergessene Lied
  - Das Erkennen
  - Karl der Grosse und Wittekind
- 3 Historical Ballades, Op. 67 [1837, pub. 1838]
  1. Der Feldherr (Bonaparte im Pestspital zu Kairo)
  2. Die Glocken zu Speier
  3. Landgraf Ludwig: Legend
- 3 Ballades of F. Freiligrath, Op. 68 [1839]
  1. Schwalbenmärchen
  2. Der Edelfalk
  3. Der Blumen Rache
- Gerstenberg's Posthumous Poems, Op. 69 [1836, pub. 1843]
  1. Gruß an Züllchow
  2. Himmelsblüten
  3. Abendgebet
  4. Die Sterne
  5. Kerzen und Augen
  6. Der Komet
- Feuersgedanken: An Allegory, Op. 70 [1836, pub. 1843]
- 3 Lyric Fantasies [Composed 1838]
  - Kleiner Haushalt, Op. 71 [pub. 1840]
  - Die Göttin im Putzzimmer, Op. 73 [pub. 1844]
  - Die Zugvögel, Op. 74 [pub. 1844]
- Legends (for alto voice) [pub. 1840]
  - Book I, Op. 75 [1837]
    1. Das Grab zu Ephesus
    2. Der Weichdorn
    3. Der heilige Franziskus
    4. Das Wunder auf der Flucht
  - Book II, Op. 76 [pub. 1840]
    1. Die Einladung [1837]
    2. Scholastica (with Chorus) [1838]
- 3 Ballades, Op. 78 [1839, pub. 1840]
  1. Jungfräulein Annika: Ballad after the Finnish
  2. Die verlorene Tochter: Folk Ballad
  3. Blumenballade (Annunciata)
- Die Heinzelmännchen: A Fairy Tale, Op. 83 [1841, pub. 1842]
- Mahomet's Gesang: Ode (for tenor), Op. 85 [1840, pub. 1842]
- "Mein Herz, Ich will Dich fragen" (from F. Halm's Der Sohn der Wildnis), Op. 86 [1842, pub. 1842]
- Lieder from Waldblumen: A Song Offering of Dilia Helena, 1st Bouquet, Op. 89 [1842, pub. 1843]
  1. Vorspiel ("Das Glockenspiel der Phantasie")
  2. Dein Auge
  3. Allmacht Gottes
  4. Des Mädchens Wunsch und Geständnis
  5. Du Geist der reinsten Güte
  6. "Mit jedem Pulsschlag leb' ich dir"
- Prinz Eugen, Op. 92 [1844]
- Meerfahrt, Op. 93 [1843, pub. 1843]
- 2 Ballades, Op. 94 [1843, pub. 1843]
  1. Die Überfahrt
  2. Die Schwarzen Augen
- Alpin's Klage um Morar, (Note: Song from Goethe's sequel to Ossian's "Colma") Op. 95 [1844]
- 3 Ballades of Frieligrath, Op. 97 [1844]
  1. Der Mohrenfürst
  2. Die Mohrenfürstin
  3. Der Mohrenfürst auf der Messe
- Der Graf Von Habsburg, Op. 98 [1843]
- Kaiser Karl V: 4 Historical Ballads, Op. 99 [1844]
  1. Das Wiegenfest zu Gent
  2. Kaiser Karl in Wittenberg
  3. Der Pilgrim von St. Just [1832] (Note: borrowed from Op. 9, Bk.VII, No. 1)
  4. Die Leiche zu St. Just
- 3 Lieder, Op. 103 [1844, pub. 1845]
  1. Gruss vom Meere (Note: Poem written on board the Veloce by the Prince of Schwarzenberg)
  2. Menschenlose (Die vier Tropfen): An Allegory
  3. Deutsche Barcarole
- Tod Und Todin, Op. 105 [1844, pub. 1845]
- Die Reigerbaize: Historical Ballad, Op.106 [1843]
- Lieder from Waldblumen: A Song Offering of Dilia Helena, 2nd Bouquet, Op. 107a [1842, pub. 1846]
  1. Mondlicht
  2. Alles in dir
  3. Frühling
- 2 Ballades of J. N. Vogl, Op. 108 [1846-1847, pub. 1847]
  1. Die Kaiserjagd im Wienerwald
  2. Hueska
- Der Verfallene Mühle, Op. 109 [1847]
- 2 Lieder, Op. 110 [1847]
  1. Am Klosterbrunnen: An Allegory
  2. Wolkenbild
- Der Papagei: Comedic Ballad, Op. 111 [1847]
- Des Glockentürmers Töchterlein (2nd setting, for soprano or tenor), Op. 112a [1850]
- 2 Ballades (for bass or baritone) [pub. 1850]
  - Der Mönch Zu Pisa, Op. 114 [1846]
  - Der Gefangene Admiral, Op. 115 [1850]
- 3 Ballades, Op. 116 [1846, pub. 1850]
  1. Die Dorfkirche
  2. Der alte König
  3. Der Mummelsee
- Odins Meeresritt oder Der Schmied auf Helgoland, Op. 118 [1851, pub. 1854]
- Des Königs Zuversicht, Op. 118a
- Lied der Königin Elisabeth, Op. 119 [(?)]
- Die Begegnung am Meeresstrande: English Ballad, Op. 120a [(?)]
- 2 Ballades, Op. 121 [pub. 1853]
  1. Kaiser Otto's Weihnachtsfeier (for bass or alto) [1853]
  2. Der Drachenfels: Legend (for tenor or soprano) [1838] (Note: First published in J.M. Dunst's Rhein-Sagen und Lieder...Band 1 Heft 2 in 1838)
- Kaiser Heinrichs IV. Waffenweihe, Op. 122 [1853] (Note: The subject of the ballad is probably Heinrich V)
- 3 Gesänge, Op. 123 [1852, pub. 1856]
  1. Sängers Gebet
  2. Trommelständchen
  3. Die Uhr: Eine Allegorie
- Der lezte Ritter: 3 Historical Ballads of A. Grün, Op. 124 [1853]
  1. Max in Augsburg
  2. Max und Dürer
  3. Max' Abschied von Augsburg
- 3 Ballades (for a bass voice), Op. 125 [1856, pub. 1856]
  1. Landgraf Philipp der Großmütige
  2. Das Vaterland
  3. Der alte Schiffsherr
- Sanct Helena (Der Verbannte) (for bass or baritone), Op. 126 [1853, pub. 1858]
- Der kleine Schiffer (Die Königssohn) (for soprano), Op. 127 [1857]
- Archibald Douglas (for low voice), Op. 128 [1857, pub. 1858]
- 3 Ballades, Op. 129 [1859, pub. 1861]
  1. Der Teufel (after Quran: Surah 7)
  2. Der Nöck: Ballad from a Nordic Saga
  3. Die Schwanenjungfrau (for soprano or tenor)
- Liedergabe, Op. 130 [1859, pub. 1860]
  1. Die Waldkapelle
  2. Die Herzensrose
  3. Abendstunde ("Die Amsel flötet")
  4. Der Hirt auf der Brücke
  5. Frühlingsankunft
- Der Asra, Op. 133 [1863, pub. 1867]
- Agnete: A Ballade, Op. 134 [late 1850s]
  1. "Es schaute in die Wogen die Maid im Abendschein"
  2. “Sie stürzt dem Neck zu Füssen”
  3. “Sie ist herauf gestiegen aus der kristallnen Gruft”
  4. “Und heller und heller quollen die Hymnen, der Orgel Sang”
- Tom der Reimer: Old Scottish Ballad, Op. 135 [1860, pub. 1867]
- Nebo: Legend, Op. 136 [1860, pub. 1866]
- König Wilhelm: Prussian Folk Hymn (version for voice & piano), Op. 139 [1861]
- Die Gottesmauer: Legend, Op. 140 [1850, pub. 1868]
- Der Seltene Beter (Der Alte Dessauer) (for bass or baritone), Op. 141 [pub. 1868]
- Der Traum Der Witwe: An Arabic Legend (for alto or baritone), Op. 142 [1860, pub. 1868]
- Spirito Santo (for alto or baritone), Op. 143 [1864, pub. 1868]
- 5 Lieder (for a low voice), Op. 145 [1859-1860, pub. 1869]
  1. Meeresleuchten
  2. Der Feind (Der Mensch)
  3. Im Sturme
  4. Heimlichkeit
  5. Reiterlied
- Works published w/o opus number
  - In die Ferne: Preislied [1837, pub. w/o opus 1837]
  - Hinaus! Hinauf! Hinab! [1840, pub. w/o opus 1840]
  - Die Mutter An Der Wiege [1840, pub. w/o opus 1842]
  - Traumlicht [1842, pub. w/o opus 1842]
- Works published in albums or collections
  - Der Junggesel [pub. in the album Orpheus 1842]
  - Das Vöglein [1840s, pub. in E. Stoll's Beloved Songs for a Singing Voice with Piano Accompaniment 1840s]
  - Frühlingslust [1844, pub. in F. G. Klauer's Youth Voices: Collection of songs for young people with easy piano accompaniment...]
  - Wanderlied [1847, pub. in Bote & Bock's Album for the Best of the Women's Association for the Fatherland's Acquisition of a War Vessel 1848]
- Unpublished works
  - Adolescent works [before 1813?]
    - An die Natur
    - Die treuen Schwalben
    - Das Blumenopfer
    - Romanze ("In einem Thal")
    - An die Nachtigall
    - Die Jagd
    - Heimweh
    - Sehnsucht
  - Klotar (lost) [1812?, unpublished] (Note: Intended to be published as Op. 1)
  - Das Gebet des Herrn und die Einsetzungworte (for voice and organ) [1812?, unpublished] (Note: Intended to be published as Op. 2)
  - 3 Anakreon Lieder [1815?]
    1. Anakreon's 1st Lied: An die Leier (Εισ Λυραν)
    2. Anakreon's 11th Lied: Auf sich selbst 1 (Εισ Εαυτον)
    3. Anakreon's 24th Lied: Auf sich selbst 2 (Εισ Εαυτον)
  - Liebesnähe [late 1815 or early 1816?]
  - Der Liebescheue [late 1815 or early 1816?]
  - Lebewohl [1817 or 1818?]
  - Nachtlied [1820?]
  - Die Heldenbraut (Die preussische Kriegerin) [1825]
  - Nordisches Seelied [1829]
  - Die engste Nähe [1830s?]
  - Christi Huld gegen Petrus [1832]
  - Des Bettlers Tochter von Bednall Green [1834]
    - Part I: "Ein Bettelmann, schon lange blind”
    - Part II: "Die Hochzeit festlich zu begehen”
  - Gute Nacht! [1836?]
  - Findlay [1836?]
  - Schneiderlied (unfinished) [1836?]
  - 2 Lieder from Frauenliebe [1836]
    - "Nun hast du mir den ersten Schmerz gethan"
    - "Traum der eignen Tage"
  - Eingang und Maskenzug from Faust II [1836]
    - "Wenn der Blüthen Frülingsregen"
    - "Mädchen, als du kamst and Licht"
    - Nur Platz, nur Blösse!"
    - "Sei mir heute nichts zuwider" (with chorus)
  - "Komm herbei, komm herbei, Tod!" (unfinished, from Shakespeare's Twelfth Night) [1836?]
  - Der Sorglose [1837?]
  - Der fünfte Mai [1837]
  - Frage nicht! [after 1836?]
  - "Leise zieht durch mein Gemüth" [1838]
  - Letzter Seufzer [1840s?]
  - Musik [1840s?]
  - An die Muse: Hymne an die Kalliope (Note: Existing Greek melody, with new rhythm and harmony by Loewe) [1842]
  - Die Grabrose [1846?]
  - Die schlanke Wasserlilie [1847]
  - Nachtständchen [1847]
  - Fischerin und Jägerbursch [1847]
  - Brautlied (“Ich will die lauten Freuden nicht”) [1850]
  - Frühlingsweihe [1850s?]
  - Das Blümlein [1850s?]
  - Ida’s Wunsch [1850s?]
  - Jünglings Gebet [1859]
  - Polterabendlied [1859]
  - "Zu dir, dem Weltenmeister" [1862]
  - Bienenweben: Lyric Fantasy [1862 or 1863]
  - “O, Meine Blumen, Ihr Meine Fruede!” [late period composition?]
  - Gesang der Königin Maria Stuart auf den Tod Franz' II (in the style of old French folk songs) [late period composition?]
  - Der Zahn [?]
  - Amanda [?]
  - Maiblümelein [?]
  - Himmelsblüthen [?]
  - Ewige Liebe [?]
  - Nachts am Rheine [?]
  - Sängers Wanderlied [?]

=== For Solo Voice and Guitar (or Piano) ===
- Ständchen (for voice, piano and guitar) [late 1815 or early 1816?, unpublished]
- Das Schifflein [1835, pub. in "Der Minnesänger 2. Jahrgang" 1835]
- Das Muttersgottesbild im Teiche [1834, pub. in "Der Minnesänger 3. Jahrgang" 1836]
- Canzonette [1835, pub. in "Der Minnesänger 3. Jahrgang" 1836]
- Wechsel [1836, pub. in "Der Minnesänger 4. Jahrgang" 1837]
- Freibeuter [1836, pub. in "Der Minnesänger 5. Jahrgang" 1837]

=== For Multiple Voices and Piano ===
- Canons (for SATB and piano) [1817, unpublished]
  - "Liebe rauscht der Silberbach"
  - Der Abschied
- Stimmen der Elfen: 3 Duets (for soprano, alto and piano), Op. 31
  1. Waldelfen
  2. Blumenelfen
  3. Thurmelfen
- Zwist und Sühne (for two female voices and piano) [1837, unpublished]
- Gesang der Geister über den Wassern: Ode (for SATB and piano), Op. 88 [1840]
- Heilig, Heimlich! (for soprano, tenor and piano), Op. 91
- Ein Duetten-Trifolium: 3 Poems of Goethe (for two sopranos or two basses, and piano), Op. 104 [1844, pub. 1845]
  1. Die Freude
  2. An Sami: Indian Poem
  3. März
- "Noch ahnt man kaum der Sonne Licht" (for soprano, tenor and piano), Op. 113

=== For Chorus and Piano ===
- Die fünf Sinne (for soloists, chorus, and piano) [late 1820s?, unpublished]
- Die erste Walpurgisnacht (Ballade for soloists, chorus and piano), Op. 25 [1833]
- Der Wurl (unfinished, for solo voice, chorus and piano) [1850?, unpublished]

== Music for Unaccompnaied Voices ==
=== Part Songs ===
- "Groß is der Herr" (for 4 voices) [1820, unpublished]
- "Wenn einst ich tot bin" (for 4 voices) [1820, unpublished]
- From Hebrew Melodies of Byron (for SATB voices)
  - Die höh're Welt, Op. 13, No. 3
  - Davids Harfe, Op. 14, No. 3
- "Ich denke dein" (2nd setting, for SATB voices) [1823]
- 6 Gesänge (for 5 and 4 men's voices), Op. 19
  1. Jägerlied
  2. Die Glückseligkeitsinsel
  3. Germania
  4. Der Fichtenbaum
  5. "Mag da draussen Schnee sich thürmen"
  6. Nachtreise
- Geistliche Gesänge (for SATB voices), Op. 22 [pub. 1833]
  - Book I
    1. "Wenn ich ihn nur habe"
    2. "Wenn alle untreu werden"
    3. Der Hirten Lied am Kripplein
    4. Bussleid
    5. "Gottes ist der Orient!"
  - Book II
    1. Werfet alle eure Sorgen auf ihn!
    2. Engelsstimmen am Krankenbette
    3. Der nahe Retter
    4. "Wie gross ist des Allmächt'gen Güte!"
    5. "Ave Maris stella!"_"Meerstern! ich dich grüsse"
- 5 Odes of Horace (for 4 men's voices), Op. 57
  1. Wer, Gutes wollend, männlich beharrt im Sinn
  2. O wie elend ist ein Mägdlein
  3. Vorsichtig hat uns künftger Zeit Erfolg
  4. O Bandusiaquell, blinkender als Krystall
  5. Ruhe fleht vom Zeus der vom Sturm Erfasste
- Meisters Schlusswort (Canon for soprano, alto and tenor) [1836, unpublished]
- Lieder (for 3 female voices) [1836, pub. in Dreistimmigen Lieder by Kugler, Kugler & Geppert]
  - Letztes Lied
  - Beim Scheiden
  - Blumen-Evangelium
- Vierstimme Gesänge [pub. in Schott's VI vierstimmige Gesänge 1839]
  - Rüberettig (for SATB) [1837]
  - Des Glockenthürmers Töchterlein (1st setting, for 4 men's voices)
- Gesänge (for 4 men's voices) [1840, pub. in Bahn's Gesänge der Stettiner Liedertafel 1841]
  - Siftungslied
  - Otto-Lied
- Vierstimmige Gesänge of Goethe (for SATB), Op. 79 [1836, pub. 1841]
  1. Frühzeitiger Früling
  2. Nachtegesange
  3. Der Frühlingsverein
  4. Mailied
  5. Früling über's Jahr
- Mehrstimmige Gesänge, Op. 80 [1836, pub. 1842]
  - Book I: 3 Gesänge (for SATB voices)
    1. Der Lindenbaum
    2. Auf dem See
    3. "Dich soll mein Lied erheben"
  - Book II: 2 Gesänge (for 3 women's voices)
    1. Frühlingsverein
    2. Trost in Thränen
- 5 Lieder (for SATB voices), Op. 81 [pub. 1842]
  1. Im Vorübergehen
  2. Im Frühling
  3. "Bald, wenn die Biene hier summt"
  4. "In der Marienkirche"
  5. Ganymed
- 5 Humoresken (for 4 men's voices), Op. 84
  1. Urians Reise um die Welt
  2. Der Stabstrompeter
  3. Es war das Kloster Grabow
  4. Die Riesen und die Zwerge
  5. Martini
- Beim Maitrank [1845, unpublished]
- 6 Gesänge (for 4 men's voices) [after 1850?, unpublished]
  1. Das dunkle Auge
  2. Nachtlied
  3. Würde der Frauen
  4. Des Glockenthürmers Töchterlein (2nd setting)
  5. Rüberettig
  6. Die lustige Hochzeit
- 4 Weihnachts-Responsorien (for 8 voices) [1859]
  - "Puer natus in Bethlehem"
  - "Quem pastores laudavere"
  - "Gloria in excelsis"
  - "In Dulci jubilo"
- Der Friede (for 4 men's voices) [?, unpublished]
- Freimaurer-Melodien [?, pub. in Bahn's Melodies for the New Freemason Songbook]
  - Auf dem ganzen Erdenrunde
  - Brüder, die zum Bendesfeste
  - Hörtihr nicht die Stimmen tönen
  - Wohl kennt ihr den Tempel
  - Schaut Brüder hin, in jene Zeiten
  - Welche Klagetöne schallen
  - Harmonie der edlen frommen Seele
  - Hört ein Wort aus alter Zeit

=== A Capella Choruses ===
- Himmelfahrtgesang (chorale cut from the oratorio, Die Festzeiten) [before 1836, unpublished]
- Taubenlied [1844, unpublished]
- Abendlied [1844, unpublished]
- Frühlings Seele [1844, unpublished]
- 3 Psalms (for men's chorus) [pub. Dresden, 1845]
  - Psalm 23: "Der Herr ist mein Hirte" Op. 100
  - Psalm 121: "Die Hülfe mein vom Herren kommt" Op. 101
  - Psalm 33: "Freuet euch des Herrn" Op. 102
- Der Papagei: Comical Ballad (for men's chorus), Op. 111 [1847]
- Psalm 51: "Schaffe in mir Gott" for men's chorus, [1849]
- Psalm 61: "Höre Gott" [1850]
- Gottesbote [1859, unpublished]
- Das "Dolce far niente" (for men's chorus) [late 1850s?]
- Brautlied ("Von der zarten Kinder") [Late 1850s]
- Motette (Lamentations 3.22–8), for a cappella choir, [1866?]
- Psalm 65.3 [?]
- "Komm, Gott Schöpfer" [?]
- Brautkranzlied [?]
- Motette zum Bibelfeste (Hebrews 4.12), for male a cappella choir [?]
- Motette zur Einweihung des Taubstummen-Instituts, for a cappella choir [?]

== Pedagogical Publications ==
- Gesang-Lehre (Note: Full title: "Singing Instruction, designed theoretically and practically for high schools, seminaries and citizen schools")
  - 1st Edition [pub. 1826]
  - 2nd Edition [pub. 1829]
  - 3rd Edition [pub. 1834]
  - 4th Edition [pub. ?]
  - 5th Edition [pub. 1854]
- Practisch-Theoretische Klavier- und Generalbass-Schule (Note: Full title: "Practical & Theoretical School for Piano and Basso Continuo, for teachers and students according to older and newer textbooks and systems, methodically organized for beginners and children") [pub. 1851?]

== Literary Works ==
- Commentar zum zweiten Theile des Goethe'schen Faust (Note: Full title: "Commentary on the Second Part of Goethe's Faust (with two maps of ancient Greece and of the ancient world, and with a table of mythological genealogy)")[pub. 1834]
- Autobiography [pub. 1870]
