= Die Auferweckung des Lazarus =

Die Auferweckung des Lazarus may refer to

- Die Auferweckung des Lazarus (J.C.F. Bach)
- Die Auferweckung des Lazarus (Loewe)
