= Jan Hus (disambiguation) =

Jan Hus was a Czech religious reformer.

- Jan Hus (1954 film) Czech film
- John Hus (1977 film) American film with Rod Colbin as Hus
- Jan Hus (2015 film), Czech TV film with Matěj Hádek as Hus
- Jan Hus (oratorio) by Carl Loewe 1841
