= Khirbet al-Mukhayyat =

Khirbet al-Mukhayyat خربة المُخيَّط Siyagha
- Village
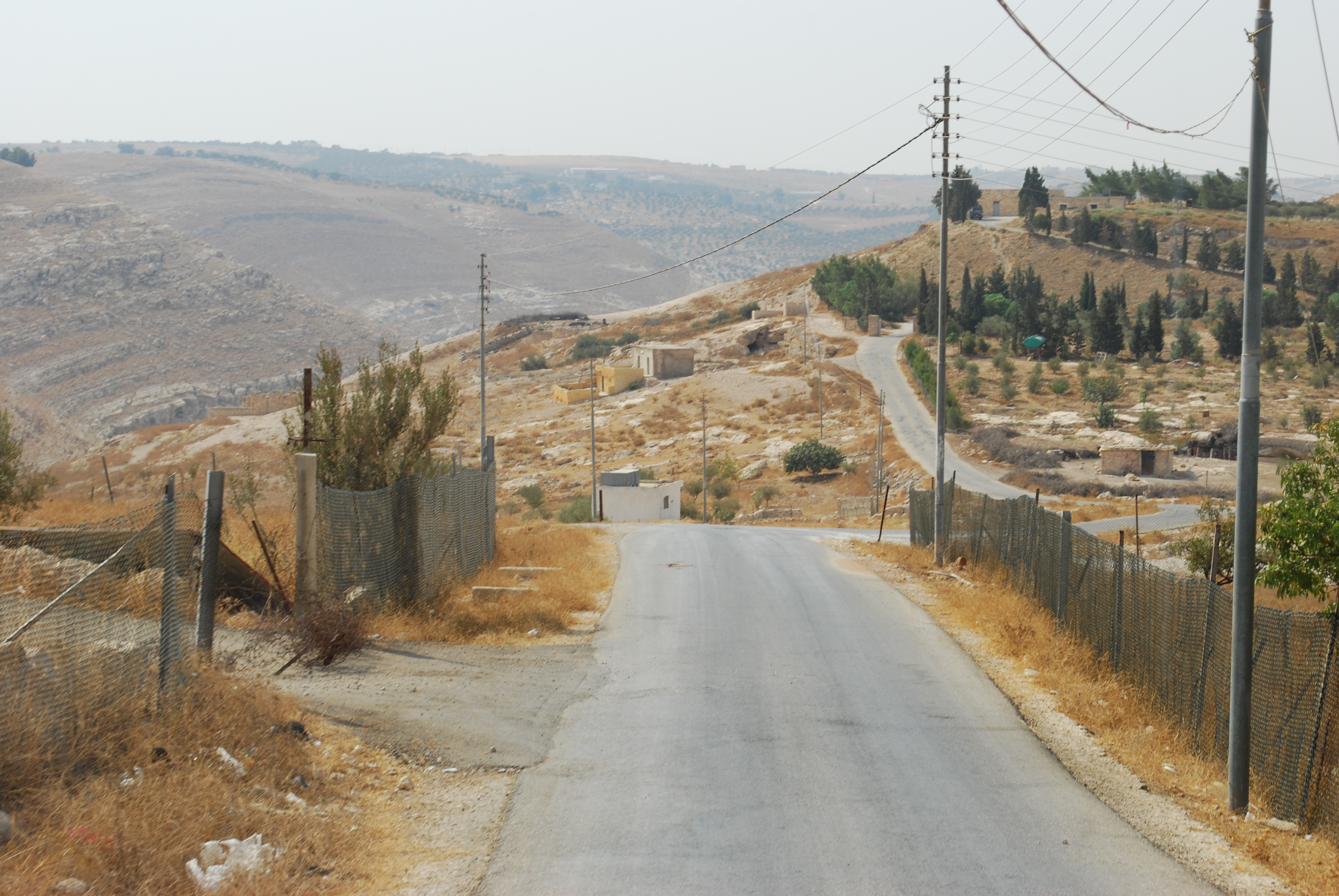

- Location in Jordan
- Coordinates: 31°46′04″N 35°43′31″E
- Country: Jordan
- Governorate: Madaba Governorate
- Elevation: 820 m (2,690 ft)
- Time zone: UTC+2 (UTC+2)
  - Summer (DST): UTC+3 (UTC+3)
- Area code: +(962)5

Khirbet al-Mukhayyat (Arabic: خربة المُخيَّط), also commonly known as the town of Nebo, is a village in Madaba Governorate in Jordan. The village is about 3.5 km from Mount Nebo, also known as Siyagha. Many Byzantine churches were found in the village, including the Church of Saint Lot and Saint Procopius, the church of St. George, and the al-Kaniseh Monastery located a short distance down in a valley below the hill. The town also contains material culture from a wide range of phases from the Chalcolithic to the Ottoman period including several Hellenistic features, an Iron Age fort, and a number of caves, tombs, cisterns and agricultural infrastructure.

Since 2014, Mukhayyat has been excavated by an international team of archaeologists, led by Dr. Debra Foran of Wilfrid Laurier University (Canada). These excavations are ongoing and indicate a long history of occupation, from the Early Bronze Age to the Ottoman period.

== Location ==
Khirbat al-Mukhayyat is located 9 km northwest of Madaba on a steep limestone escarpment. The site looks out toward the Dead Sea and the Jordan Valley. The Wadi Mukhayyat lies to the west and the Wadi Afrit to the east.

Located on the western edge of the Transjordanian Plateau, the site presents a sweeping view of the Jordan Valley with the Judean Highlands to the west. This commanding position would have allowed residents to monitor access to and from the Jordan Valley and also provided fertile agricultural opportunities.

== History ==
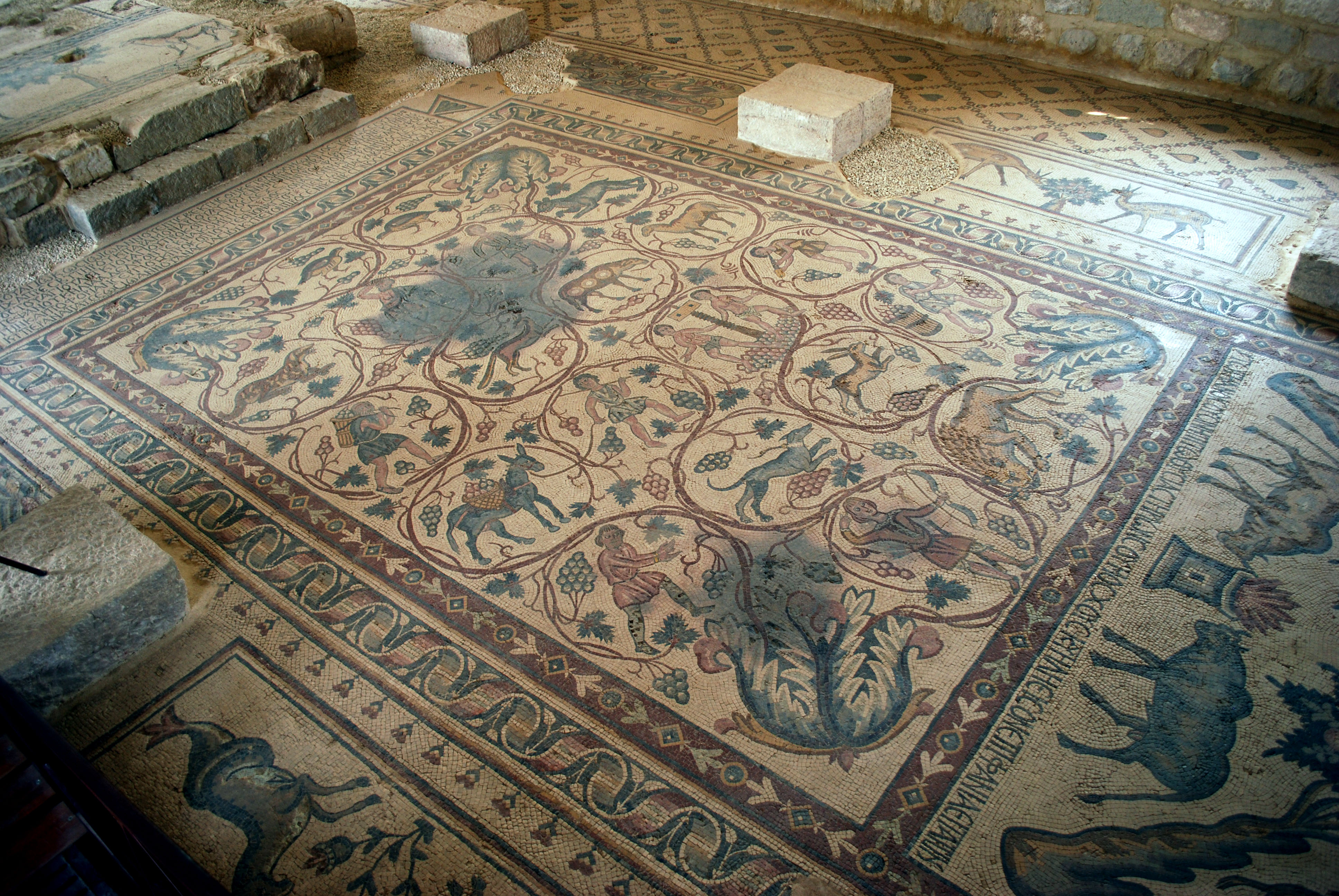
Mosaic floor in the Church of St. Lot and St. Procopius

The biblical town of Nebo is first mentioned in a stele known as the Mesha Inscription dated to the mid-9th century BCE in reference to the towns occupation by the Israelites. The Moabite king Mesha took over the settlement and removed cultic Israelite sites. The town of Nebo is often confused with the nearby Mount Nebo, but the Mesha Inscription seems to imply a settlement, and no significant Iron Age remains have been found at Mount Nebo, implying the site was likely Khirbet al-Mukhayyat.

The nearby Mount Nebo features prominently in Jewish source of Hellenistic and Roman origin, primarily as the burial place of Moses. Historic sources also mention efforts made by the Roman government to locate said tomb to no avail.

The town also has considerable Byzantine remains, with numerous churches for the growing Christian population through the 6th and 8th centuries. The Monastery of al-Kanisah, the Monastery of Theotokos, and the Monastery of the Memorial of Mount Nebo are all located nearby and the town was likely the main destination for pilgrims and travellers to the region in that period. However, the Byzantine structures in the town appear to go out of use by the 7th century BCE and subsequently abandoned. One such church is the church of St. Lot and St. Procopius. Inhabitants only returned to the site in the late 19th century CE, but only limited occupation to the north-eastern slope of the hill.

== Archaeological excavations ==
The first modern exploration of the site dates to Félicien de Saulcy in 1863 who provided the first mention of the site as Khirbet al-Mukhayyat. The site was later explored by Alois Musil who described the remains in detail and created the first detailed plan.

The site was investigated in detail by the Franciscans under Brother Jerome Mihaic who discovered the mosaics of the Chapel of Priest John and the Church of Saint George on the acropolis. Work continued under the Franciscans into the early 1970s where the mosaics were excavated.

=== The Town of Nebo Archaeological Project ===
Under Debra Foran of Wilfrid Laurier University, Khirbet al-Mukhayyat has undergone several seasons of investigation. Over the course of several field seasons, an Iron Age tower was identified, likely as part of other contemporaneous defenses also uncovered. The tower was later altered in the Hellenistic period.

A series of over 75 intact upright cooking pots were discovered buried with fill from earlier levels. This pottery arrangement is thought to be ritual associated with seasonal feasting. The soil around this pottery contains fragments of Iron Age pottery. The pots conform with the Palestinian type of Hellenistic ceramics.

== Gallery ==
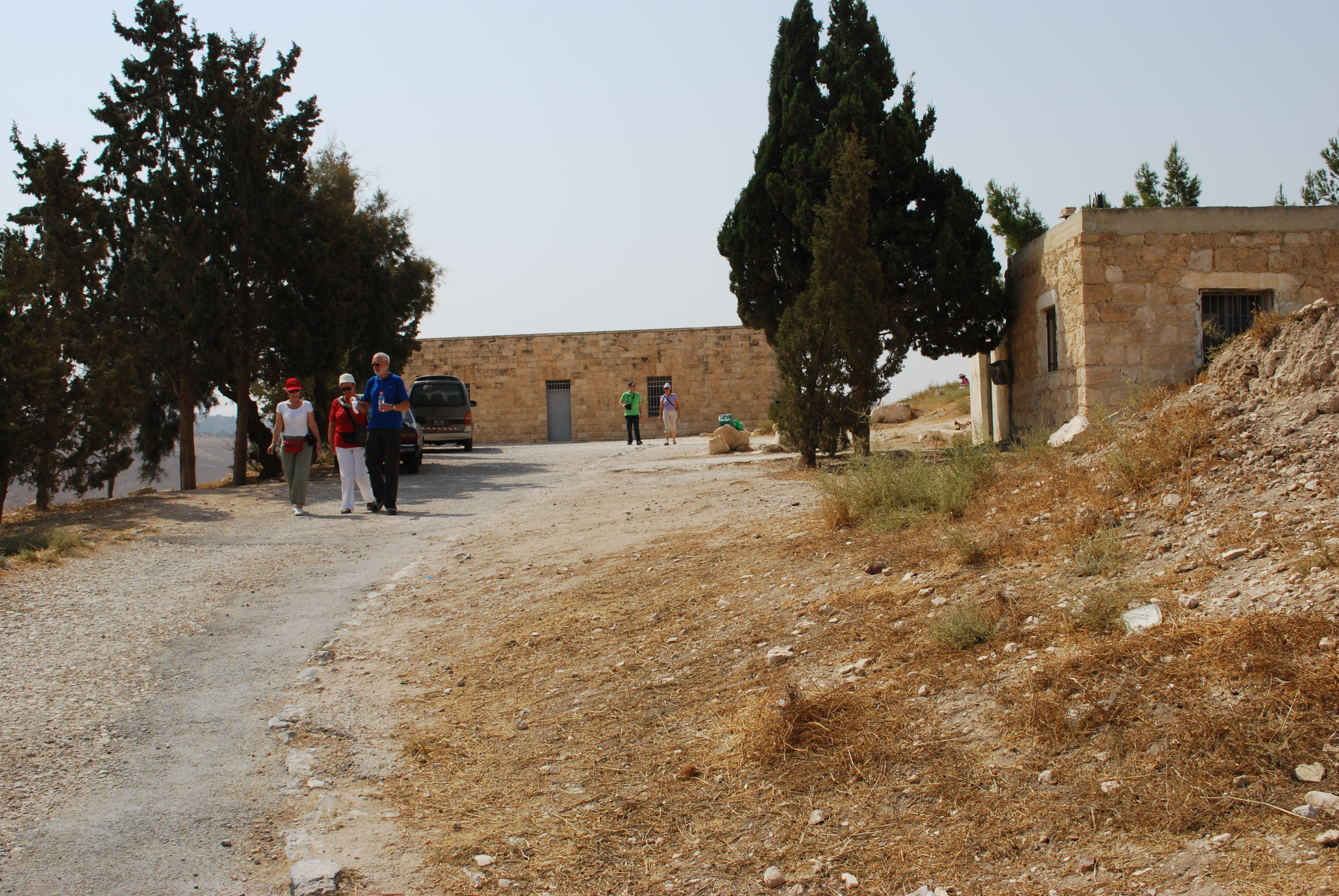
Tourists at St. Lot and Procopius's church

== See also ==
- Mount Nebo
- Madaba
