= Die Auferweckung des Lazarus (J.C.F. Bach) =

Die Auferweckung des Lazarus is a 1773 oratorio by J. C. F. Bach to a libretto by Johann Gottfried Herder.

== Recording ==
Die Auferweckung Des Lazarus Gellert Ensemble, Andreas Mitschke, Genuin, 1CD, 2021
