= Mount Nebo =

Abrahamic holy site in Jordan

- جَبَل نِيبُو הַר נְבוֹ
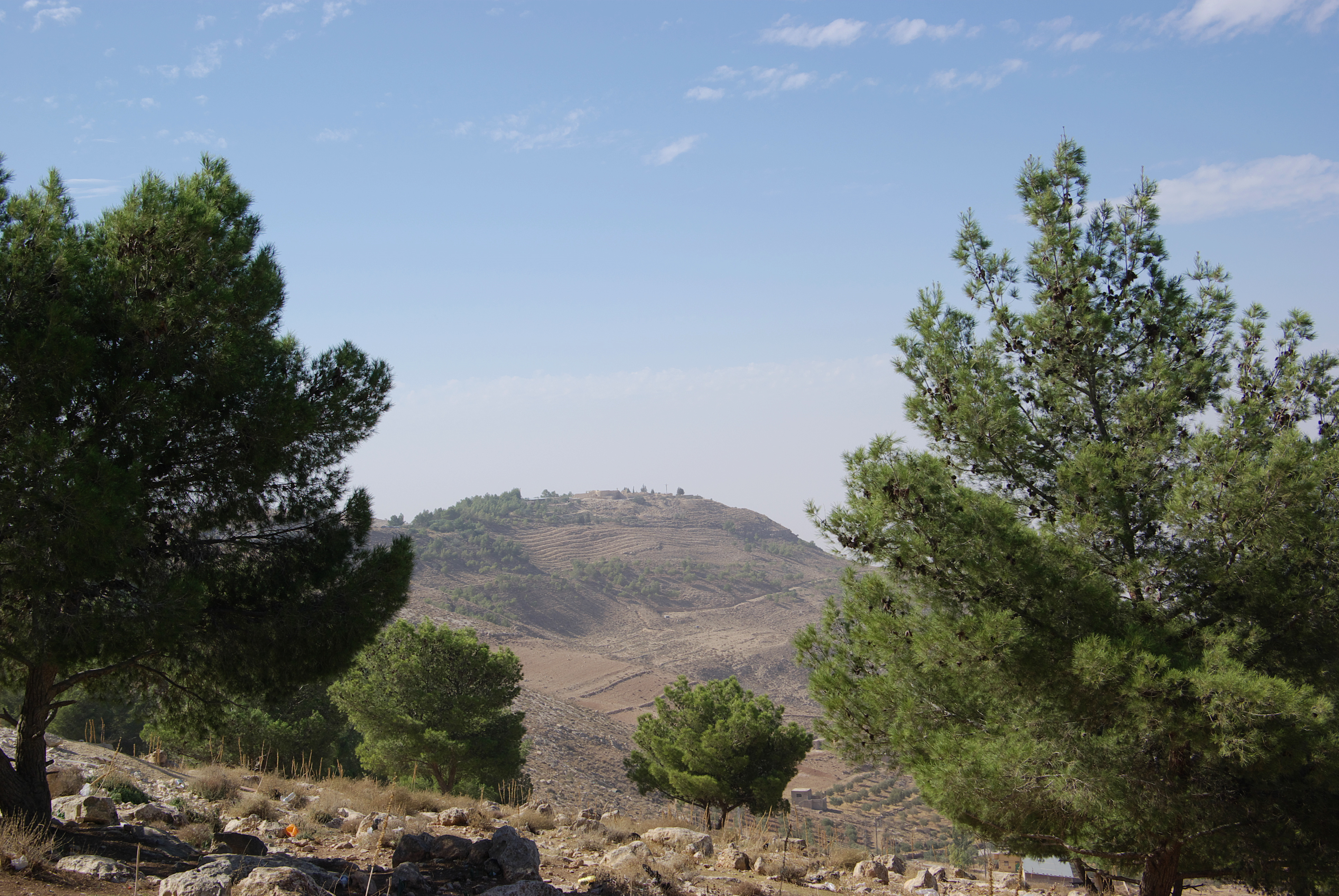
- Mount Nebo seen from the east

Highest point
- Elevation: 700 m (2,300 ft)
- Coordinates: 31°46.0′N 35°43.5′E

Naming
- Native name: جَبَل نِيبُو (Arabic)

Geography
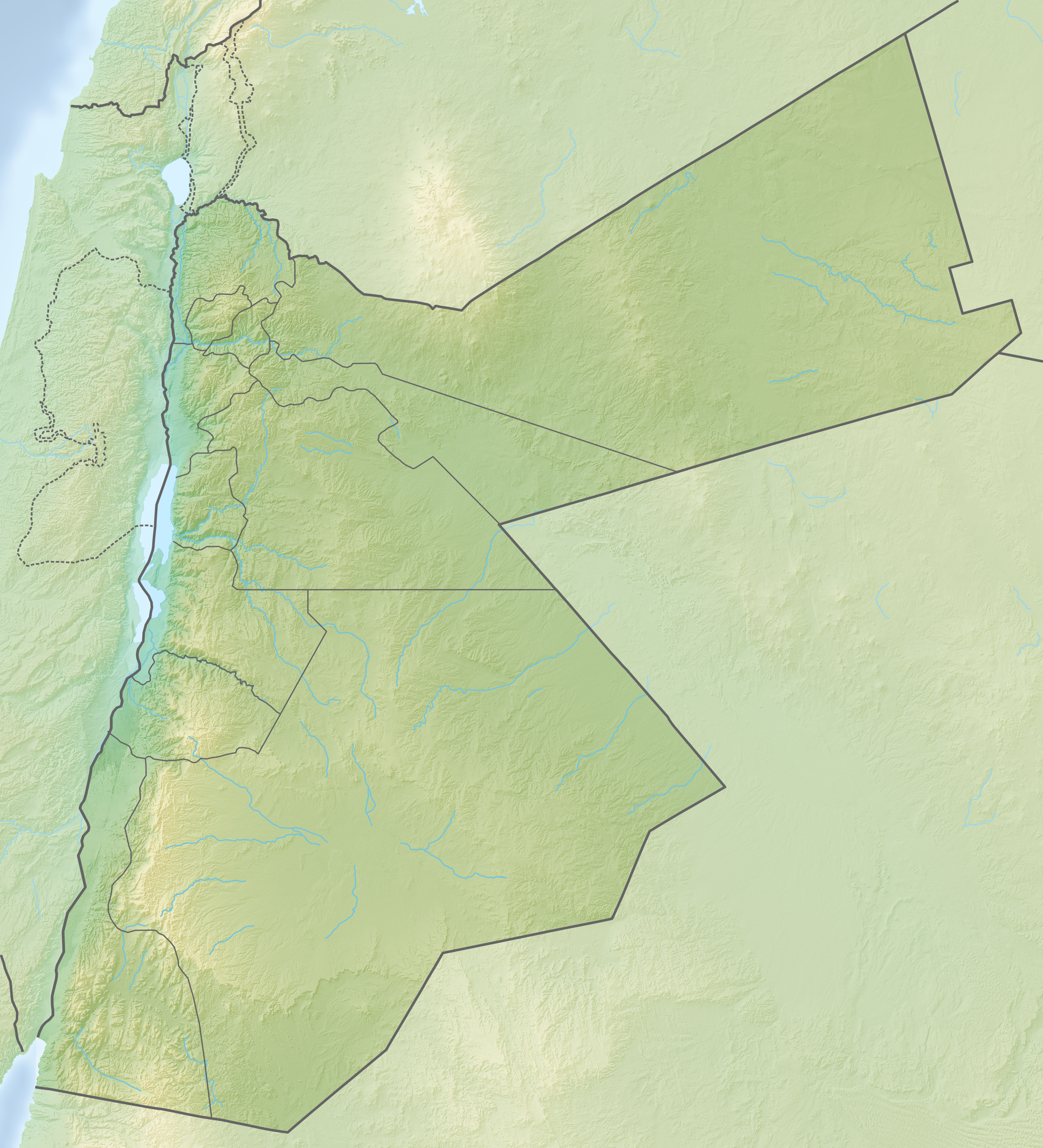
- Location within Jordan
- Location: Jordan
- Region: Madaba Governorate

Mount Nebo (Arabic: جَبَل نِيبُو, romanized: Jabal Nībū; Hebrew: הַר נְבוֹ, romanized: Har Nəḇō) is an elevated ridge located in Jordan, approximately 700 metres (2,300 ft) above sea level. Part of the Abarim mountain range, Mount Nebo is mentioned in the Bible as the place where Moses was granted a view of the Promised Land before his death. The view from the summit provides a panorama of the West Bank across the Jordan River valley. The city of Jericho is usually visible from the summit, as is Jerusalem on a very clear day. The biblical town of Nebo, now known as Khirbet al-Mukhayyat, is located 3.5 km (2.1 mi) away.

== Religious significance ==
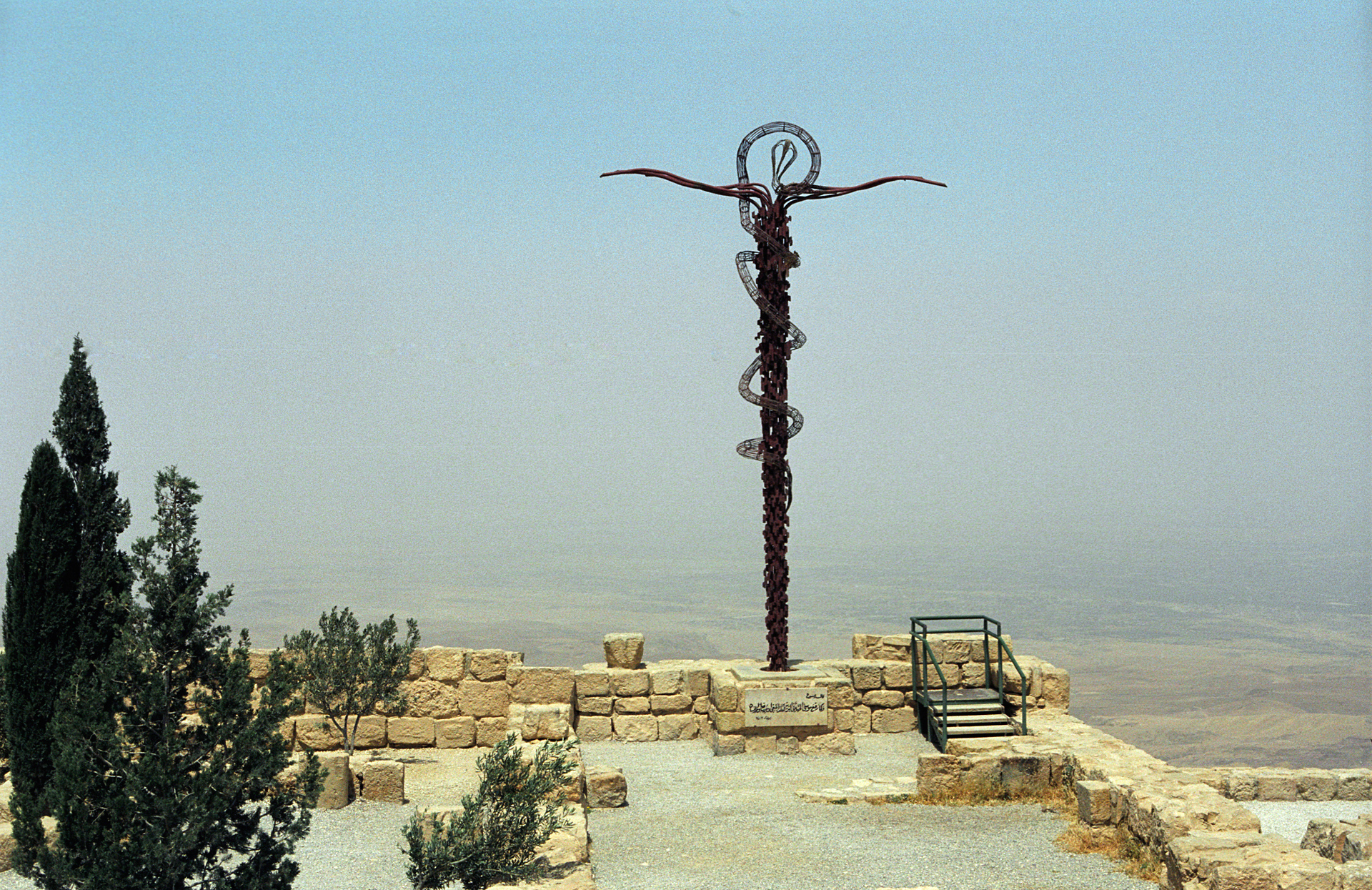
The Brazen Serpent sculpture and view towards the Promised Land–Dead Sea and Jerusalem

According to the Bible (Deuteronomy), Moses ascended Mount Nebo, in the land of Moab (today in Jordan), and from there he saw the Land of Canaan (the Promised Land), which God had said he would not enter; Moses then died there. The Bible (Deuteronomy 34:6) says Moses' burial place was unknown. A monument atop Mount Nebo commemorates Moses' death after seeing Canaan, across the Jordan valley. A purported grave of Moses is located at Maqam El-Nabi Musa, in the West Bank, 11 km (6.8 mi) south of Jericho and 20 km (12 mi) east of Jerusalem.

Mount Nebo is then mentioned again in 2 Maccabees (2:4–7), when the prophet Jeremiah hid the tabernacle and the Ark of the Covenant in a cave there.

A Christian church from Byzantine times stands on the top of Mount Nebo.

On March 20, 2000, Pope John Paul II visited the summit of Mount Nebo during his pilgrimage to the Holy Land. During his visit, he planted an olive tree next to the Byzantine chapel, as a symbol of peace. Pope Benedict XVI visited the site in 2009, gave a speech, and looked out from the top of the mountain in the direction of Jerusalem.

A serpentine cross sculpture atop Mount Nebo was created by Italian artist Gian Paolo Fantoni. It is symbolic of the miracle of the bronze serpent invoked by Moses in the wilderness (Numbers 21:4–9) and the cross upon which Jesus was crucified (John 3:14).

== Archaeology ==
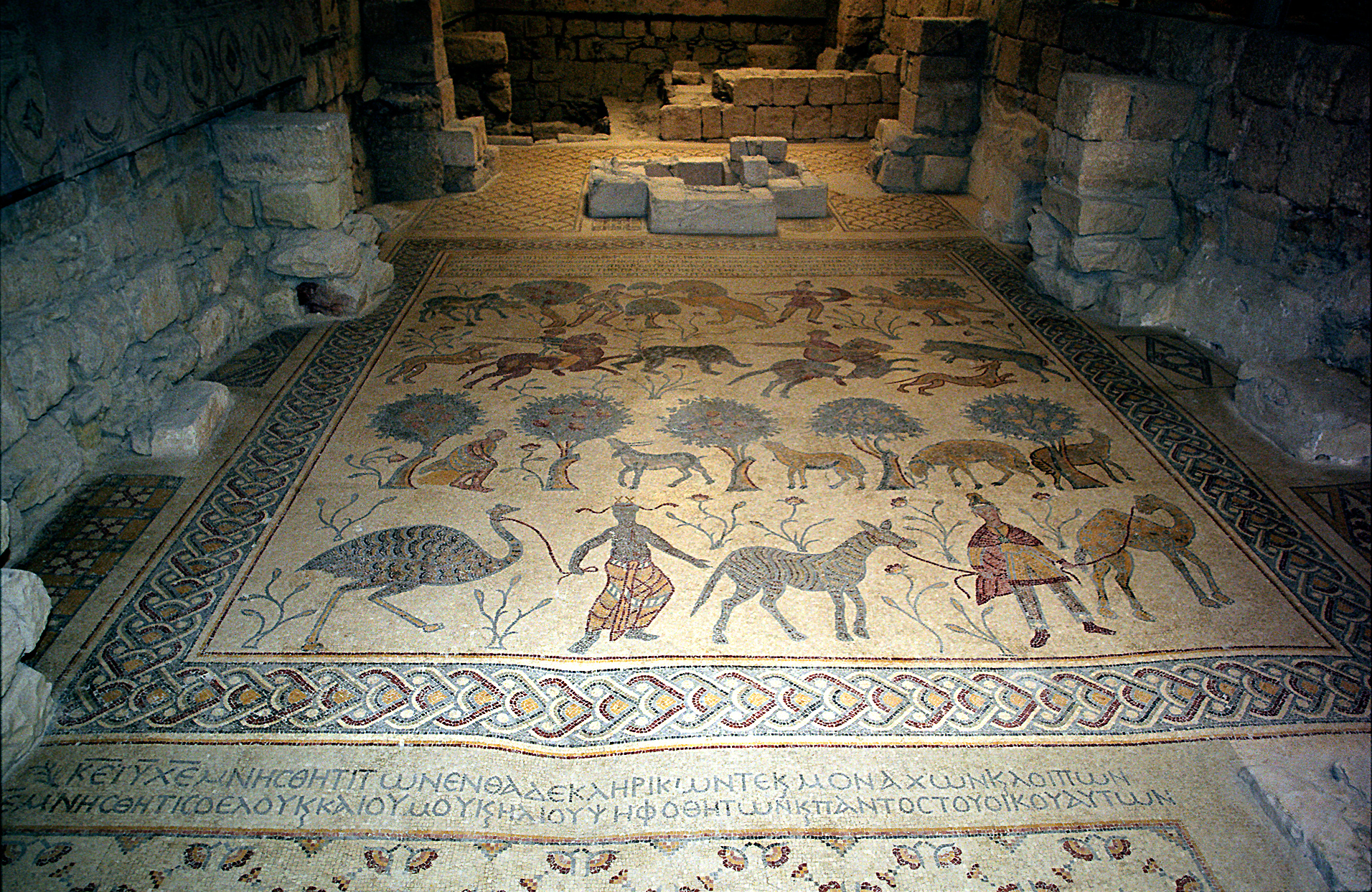
Mosaic floor in the diaconicon-baptistery

Systematic exploration begun by Sylvester J. Saller O.F.M. was continued in 1933 by Jerome Mihaic of the Studium Biblicum Franciscanum. On the highest point of the mountain, Syagha, the remains of a Byzantine church and monastery were discovered in 1933. The church was first constructed in the second half of the 4th century to commemorate the place of Moses' death. The church design follows a typical basilica pattern. It was enlarged in the late fifth century AD and rebuilt in AD 597. The church is first mentioned in an account of a pilgrimage made by a lady Aetheria in AD 394. Six tombs have been found hollowed from the natural rock beneath the mosaic-covered floor of the church.

Bellarmino Bagatti worked on the site in 1935. Virgilio Canio Corbo later excavated the interior of the basilica.

== History of the modern Memorial of Moses ==
The ancient church, a pilgrimage destination since the 4th century, was excavated between 1933 and 1938 by Sylvester Saller, bringing to light the basilica with its chapels and the annexes of the monastery. The exquisite mosaics were then covered back with soil for protection. In 1963, the Custody of the Holy Land decided to restore the mosaic floors and Virgilio Corbo was put in charge of the project. A metal shelter designed in Oxford was erected over the ruins, but work was interrupted by the 1967 Arab-Israeli war. Renewed work ensued between 1976 and 1984, when a new mosaic was discovered in the diaconicon-baptistery. By 1984 the consolidation work was completed, and as a result, the basilica could be used both for liturgical purposes, as well as for displaying the restored mosaics, either in situ or mounted on the walls. After renewed plans drawn in 1989 and geological surveys and assessments of the ancient and modern structures made a decade later, a new shelter, basically a complete basilica was built over the ancient church between December 2007 and the reopening day on 15 October 2016. Not even the sudden death of Michele Piccirillo, a key figure in the project, in October 2008, led to a break in the work.

== Exhibited mosaics ==
In the modern chapel presbytery, built to protect the site and provide worship space, remnants of mosaic floors from different periods can be seen. The earliest of these is a panel with a braided cross presently placed on the east end of the south wall.

== Gallery ==
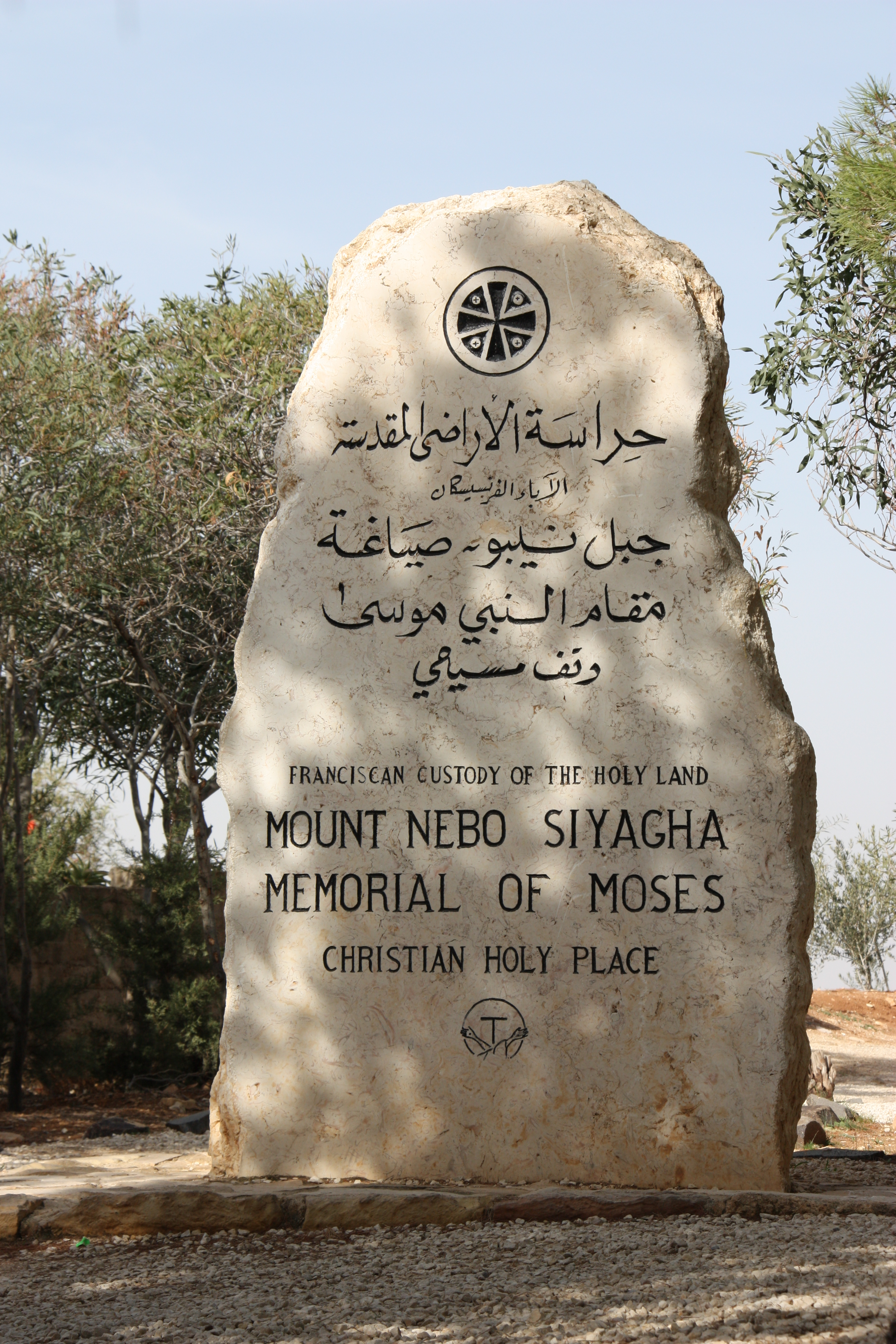
Stone marker at the entrance

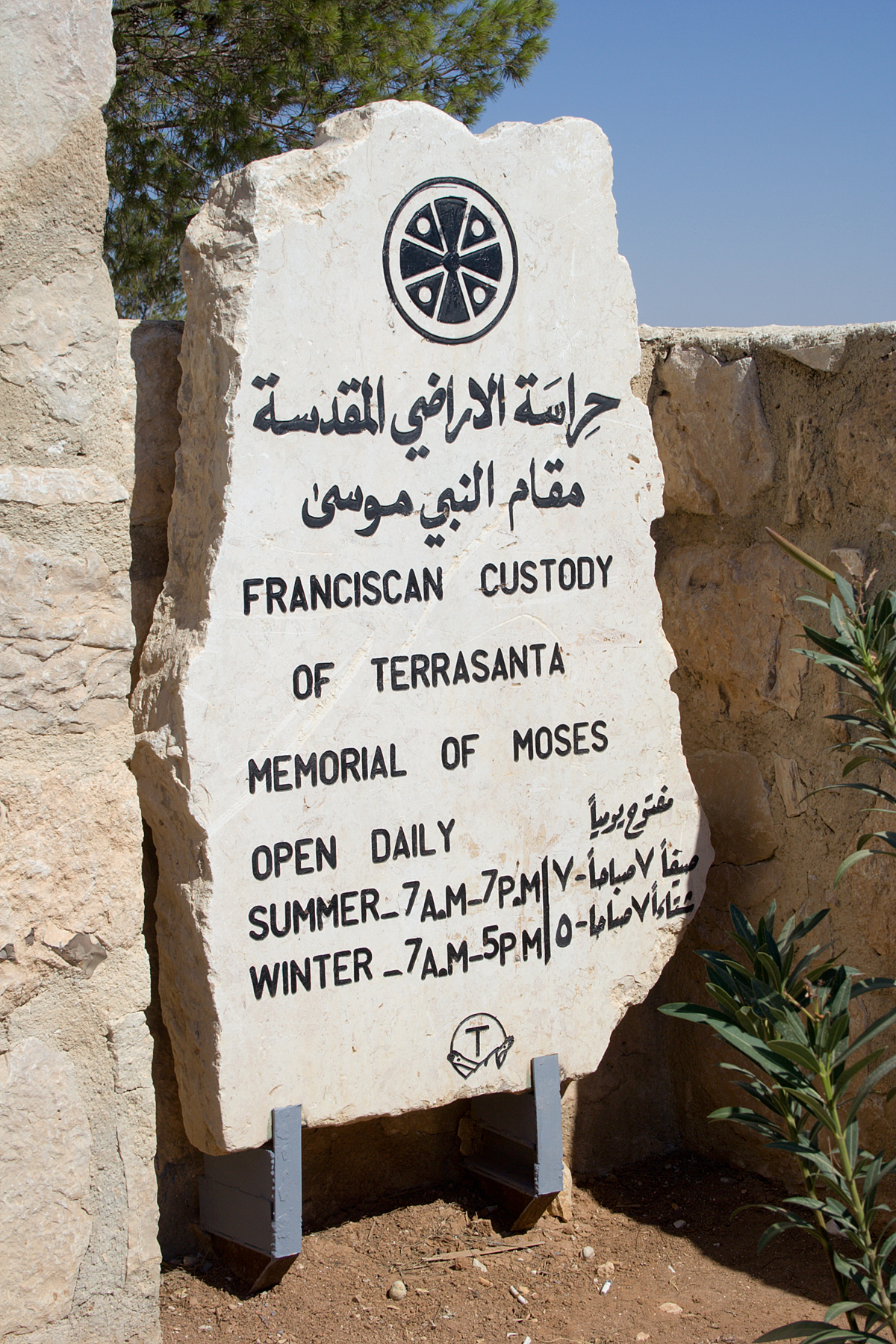
Stone marker next to the building

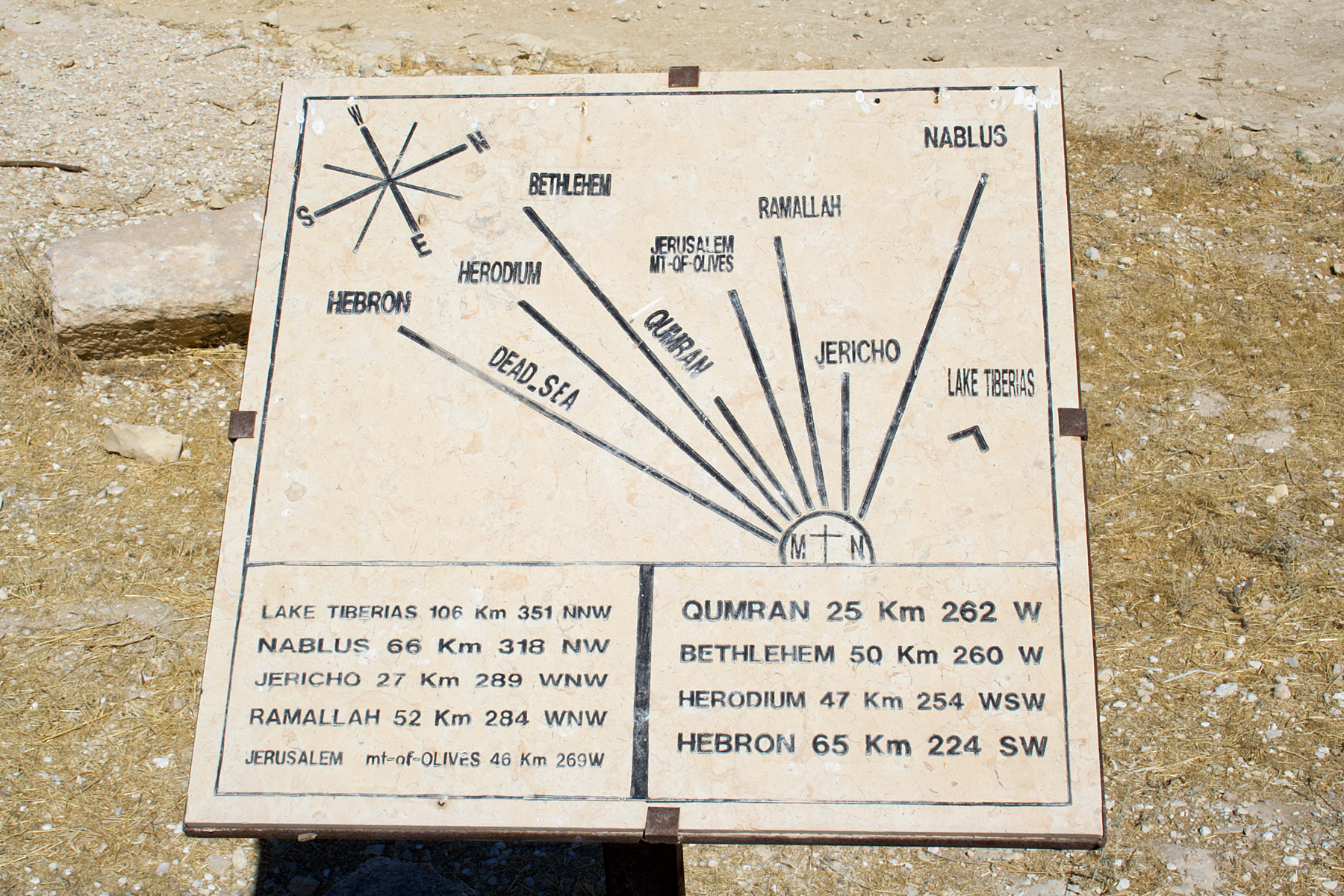
Plaque showing the distance from Mount Nebo to various locations

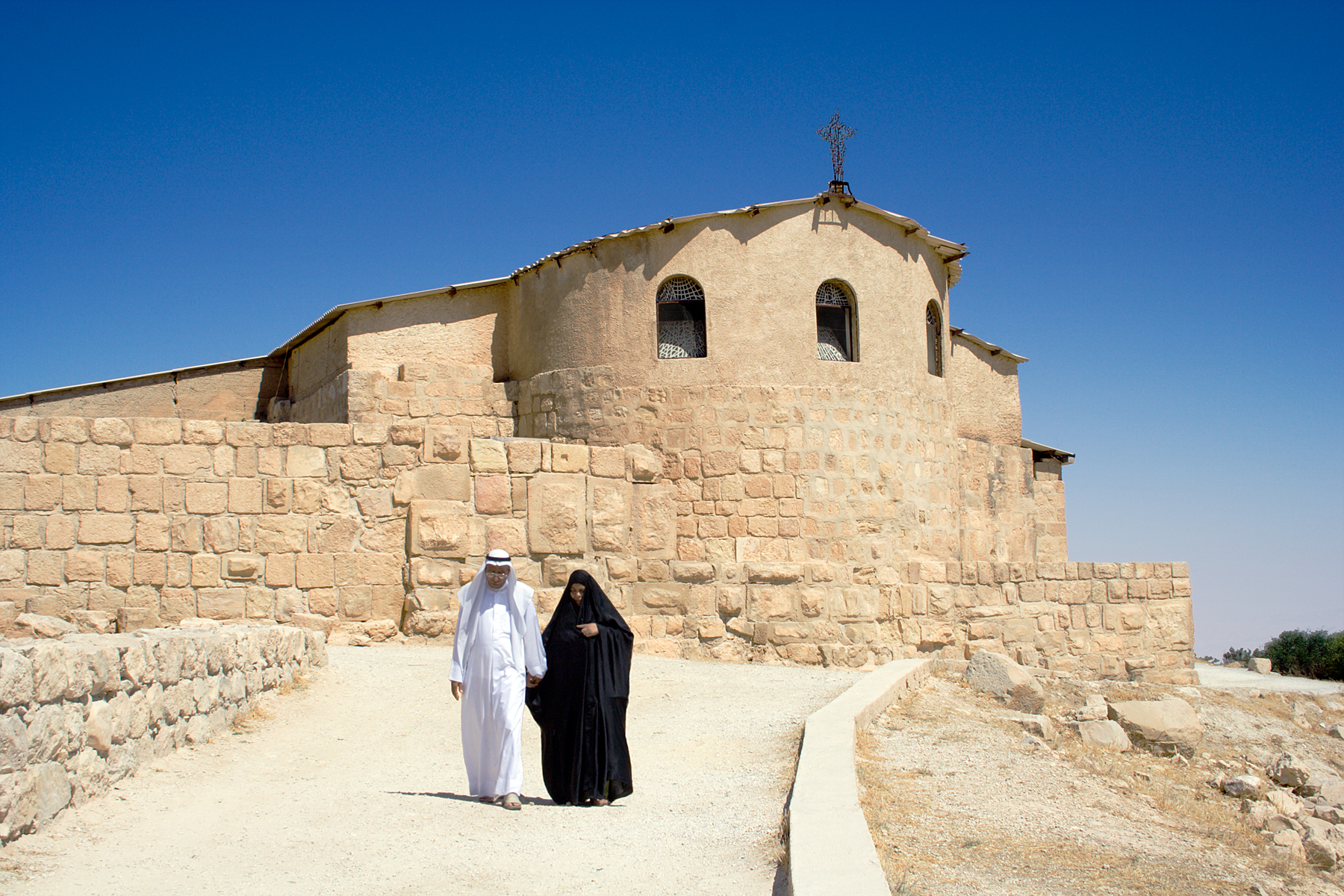
Old (pre-2017) structure protecting the excavated church remains

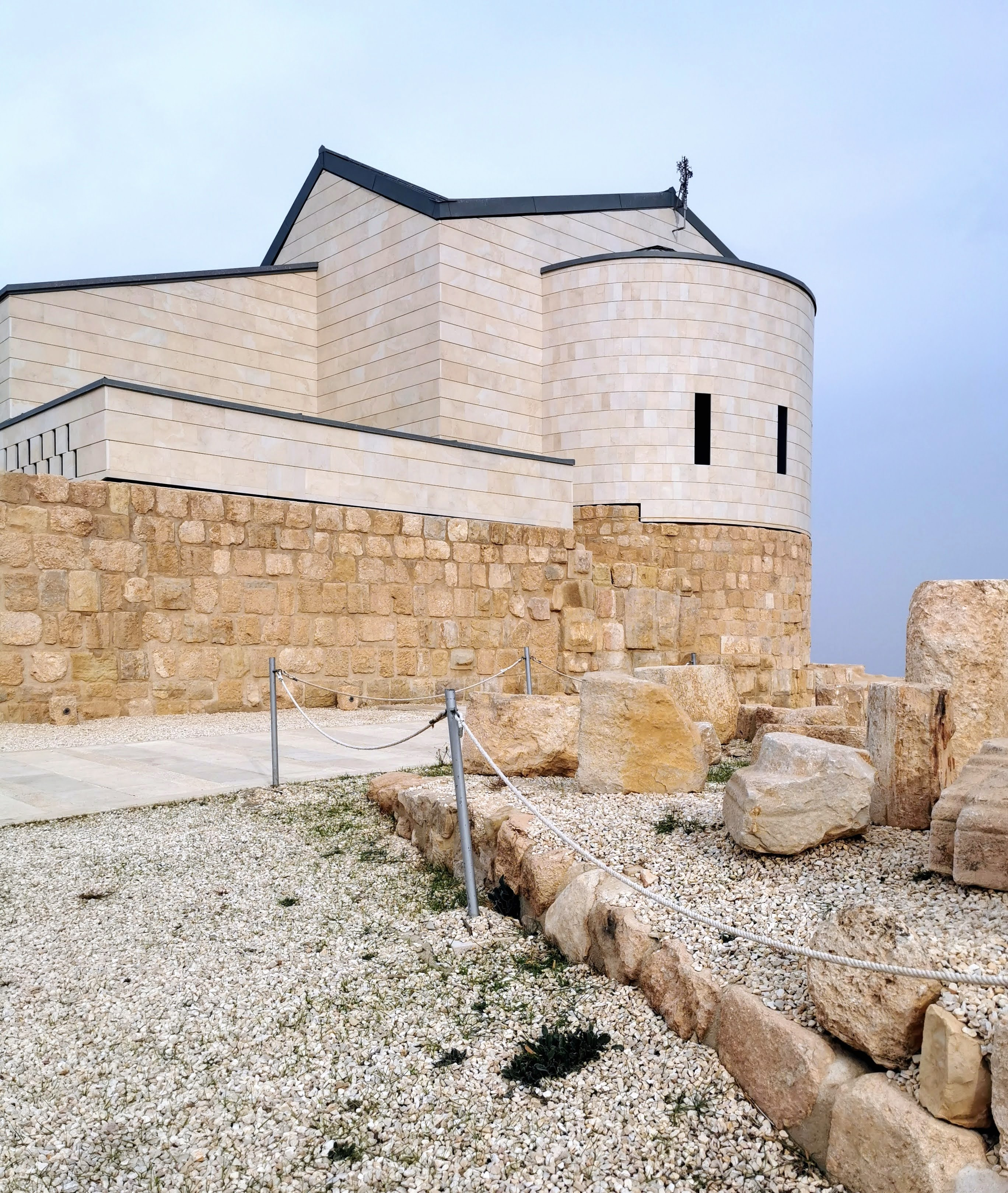
New structure

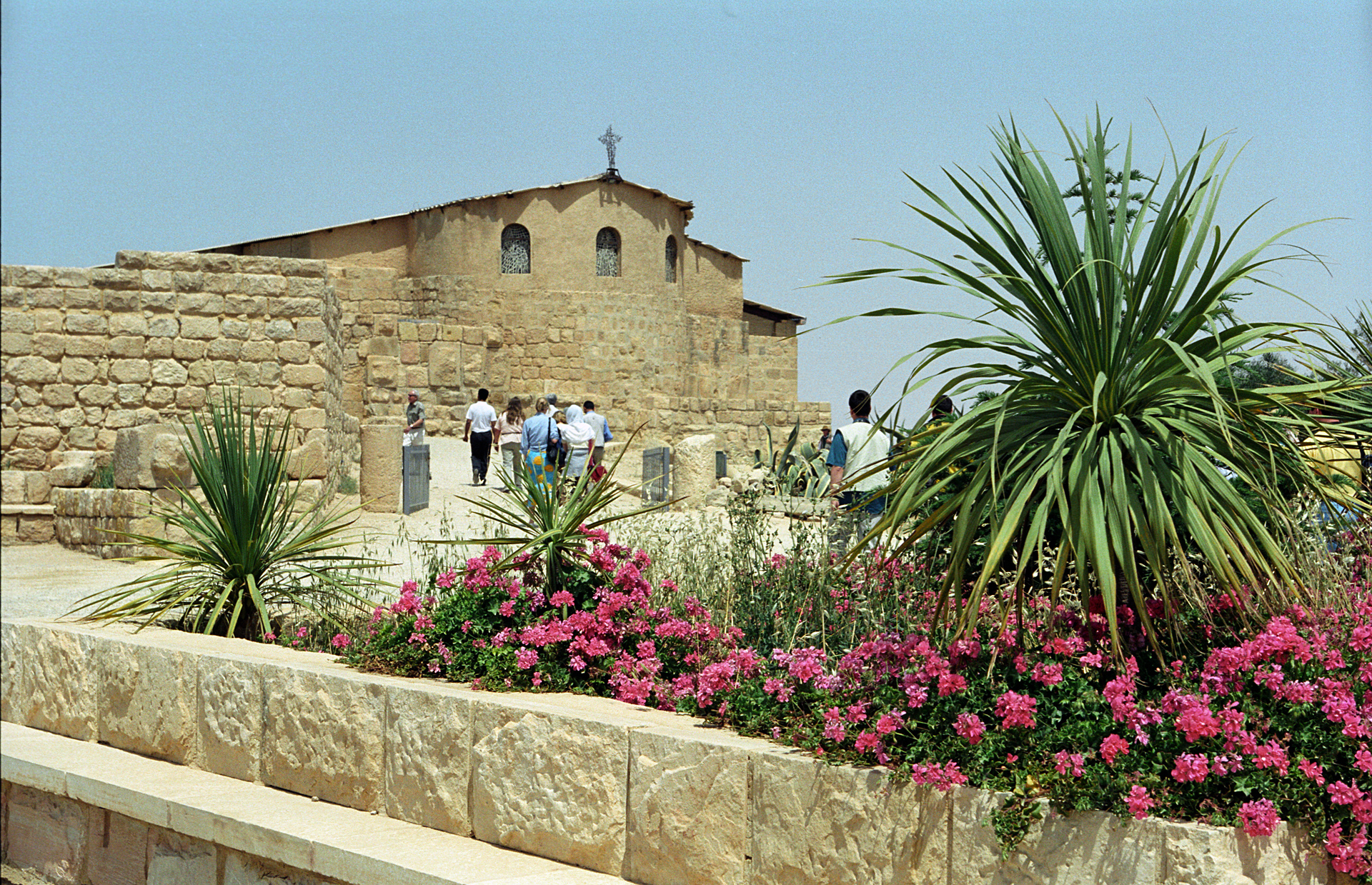
Old (pre-2017) structure

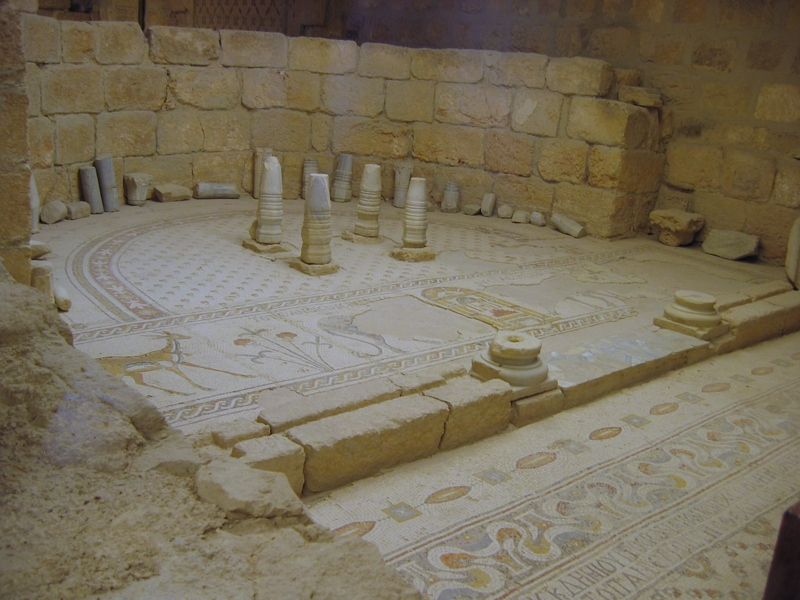
Theotokos chapel: apse with altar and mosaic

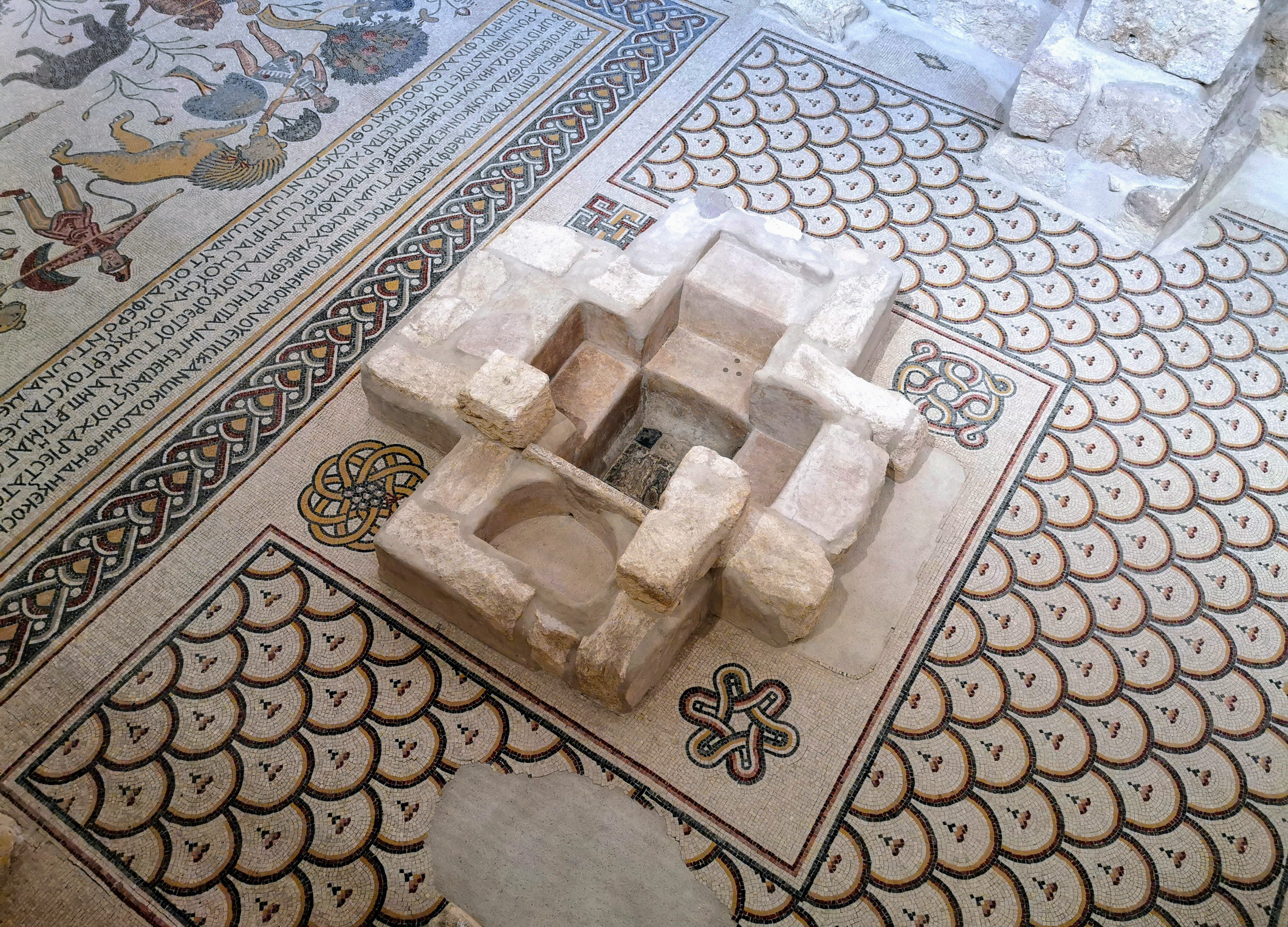
A cross-shaped baptismal font

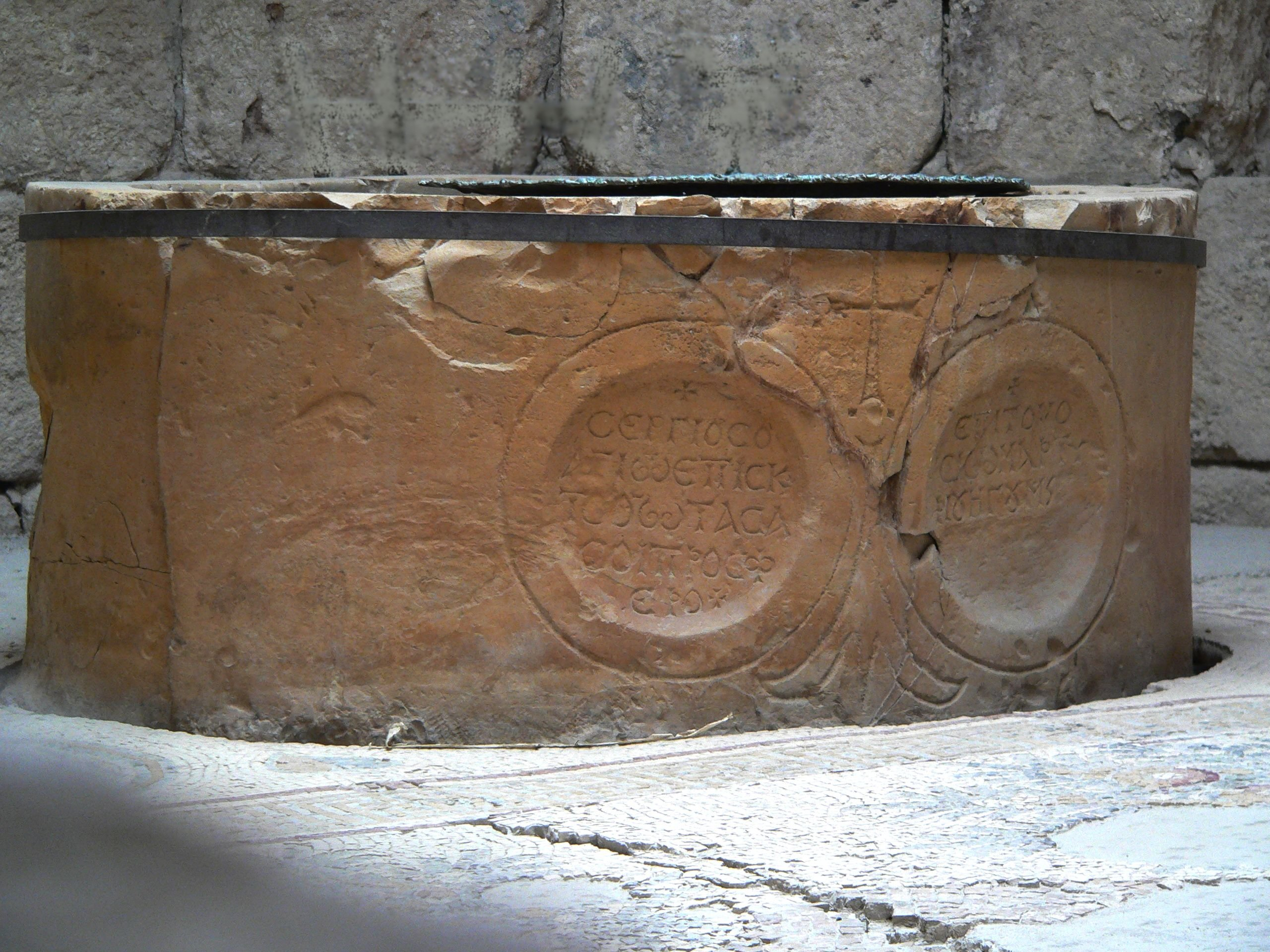
Baptismal font

Mosaic floor in the diaconicon-baptistery

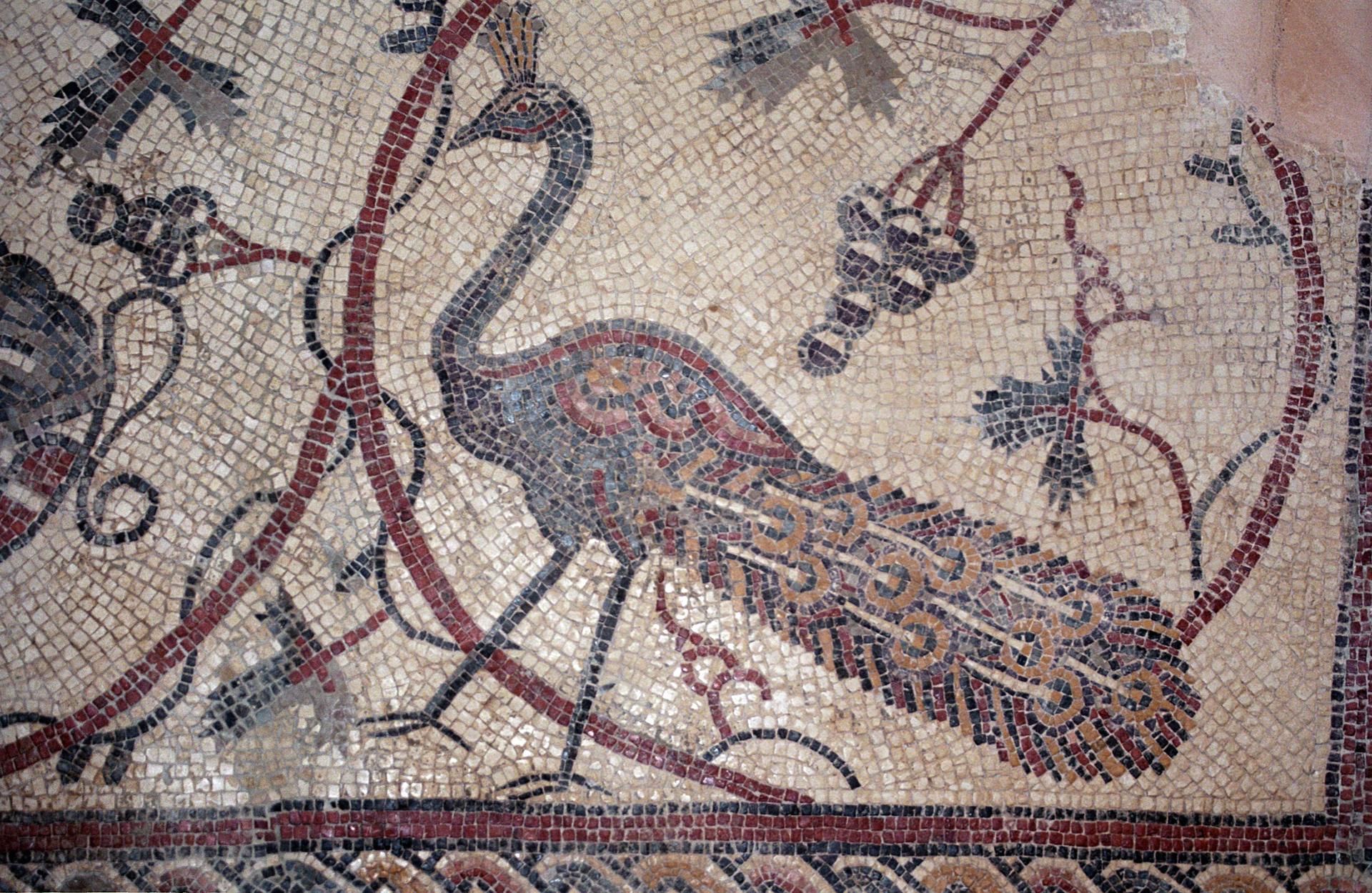
Mosaic: peacock

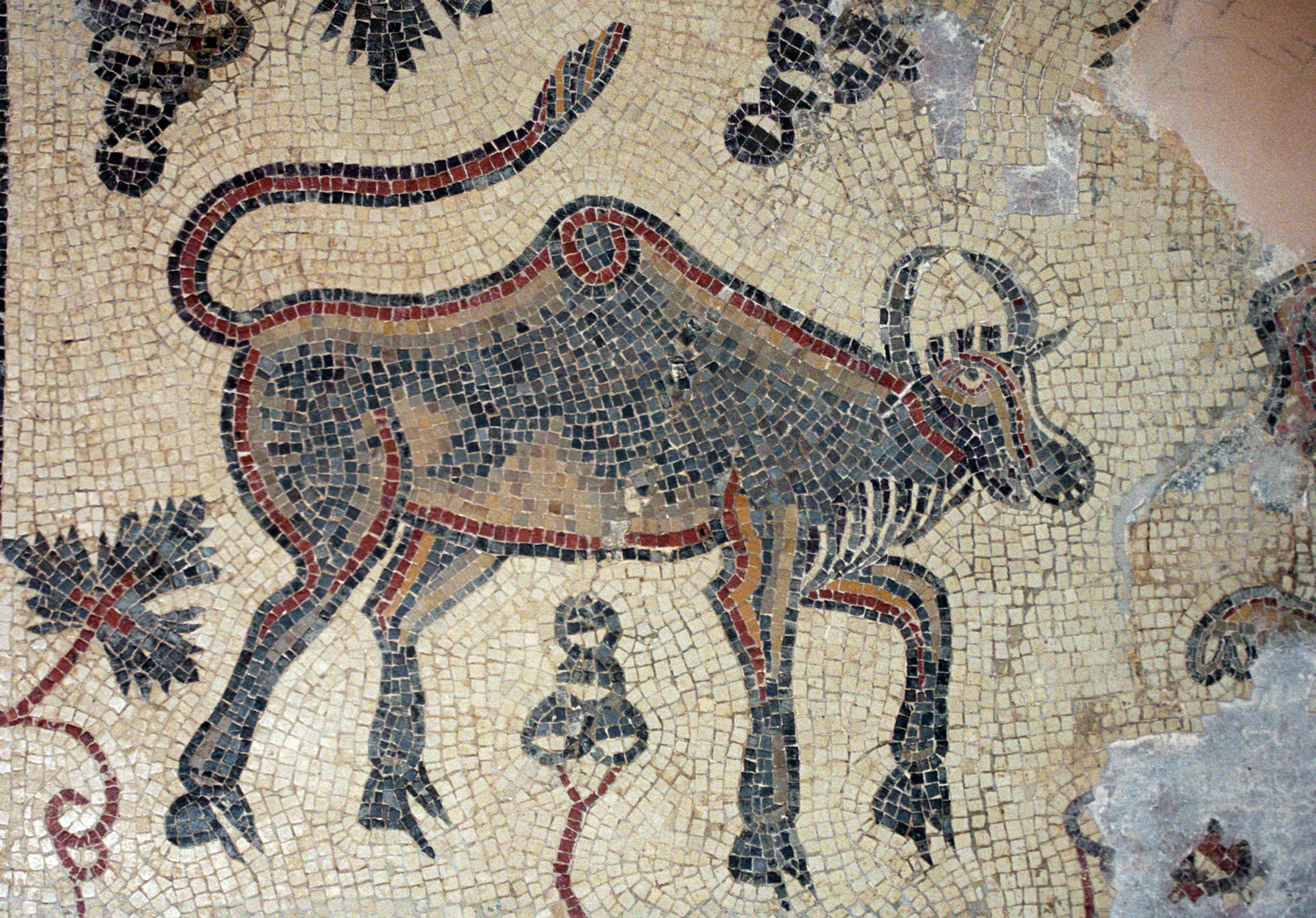
Mosaic: zebu (humped ox)

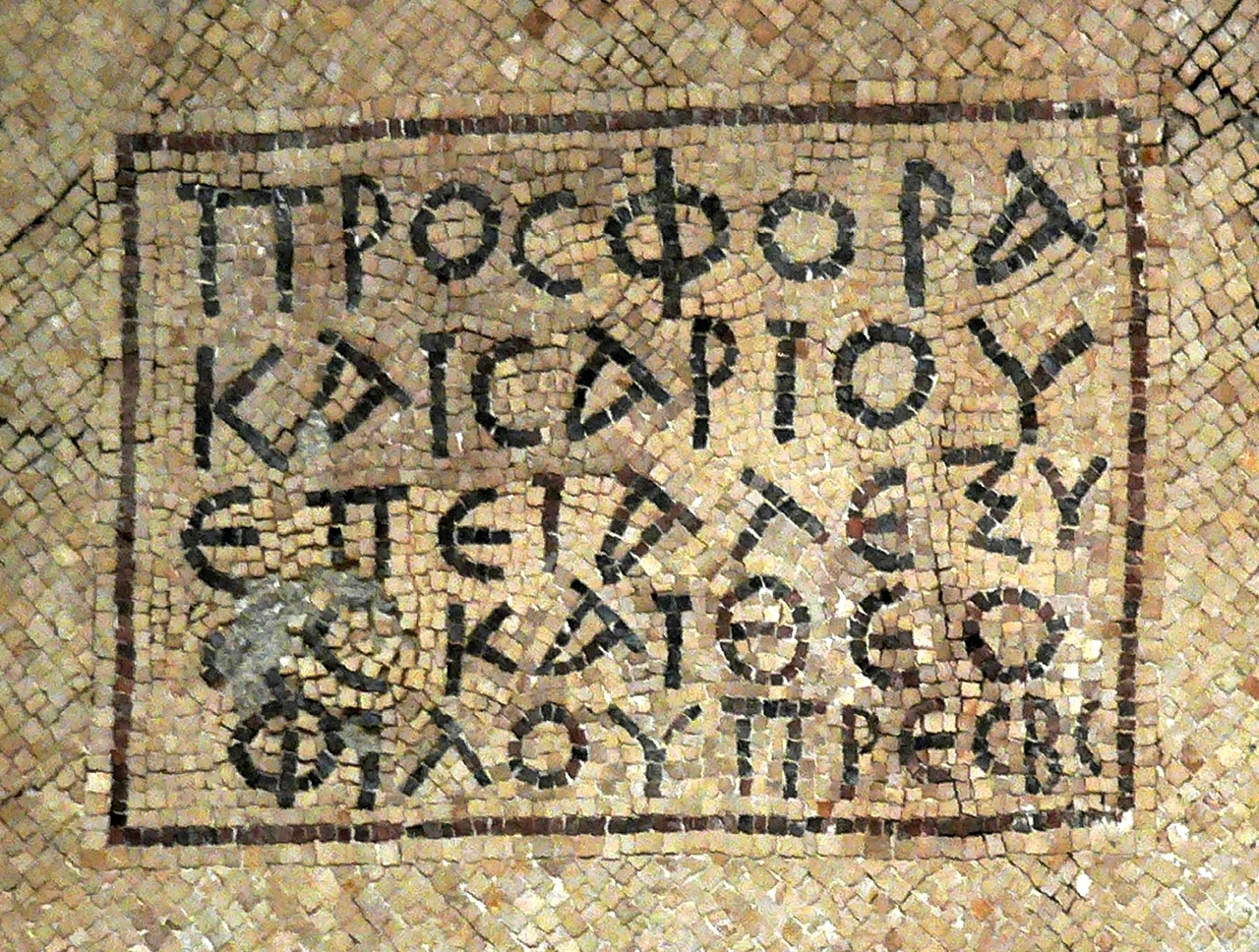
Mosaic inscription ("Offering of Caesarion, at the time of Alexios and Theophilos priests")

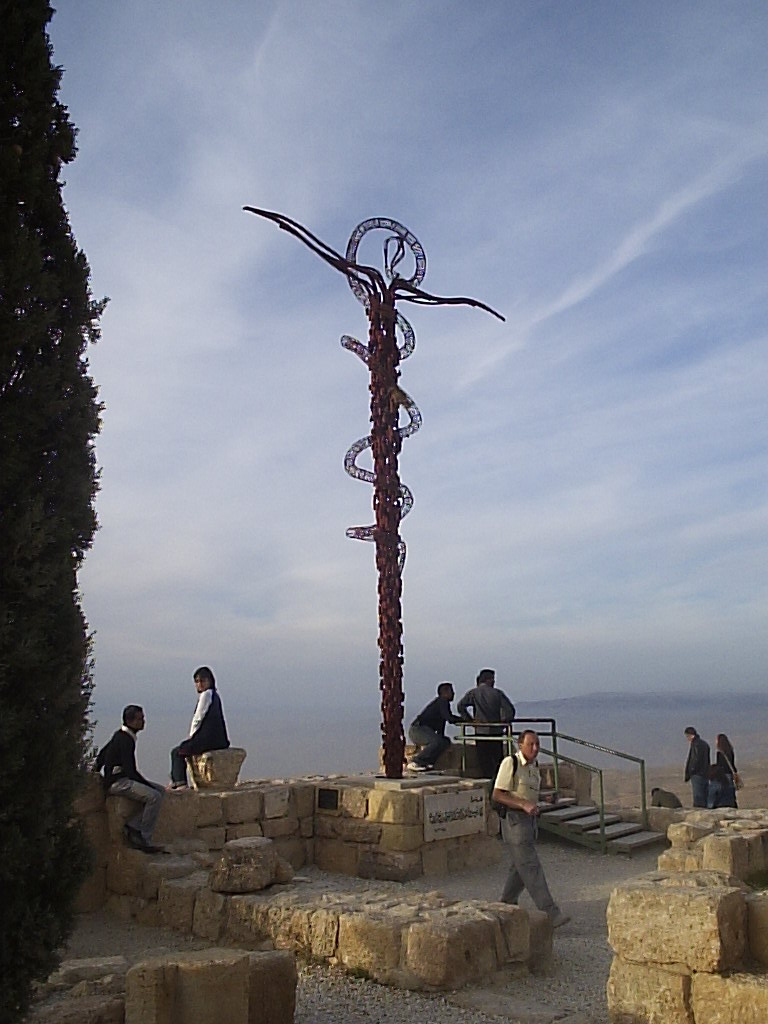
The Brazen Serpent sculpture, Mount Nebo

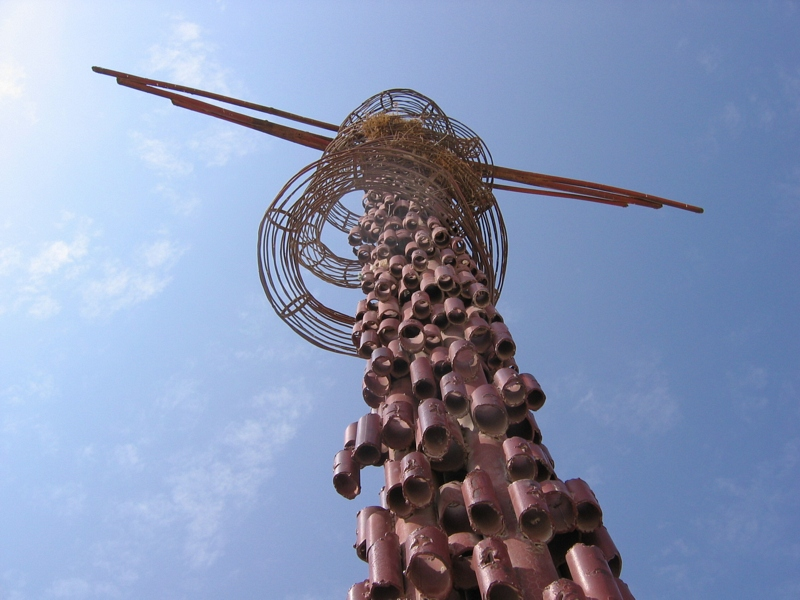
Detail of Brazen Serpent statue

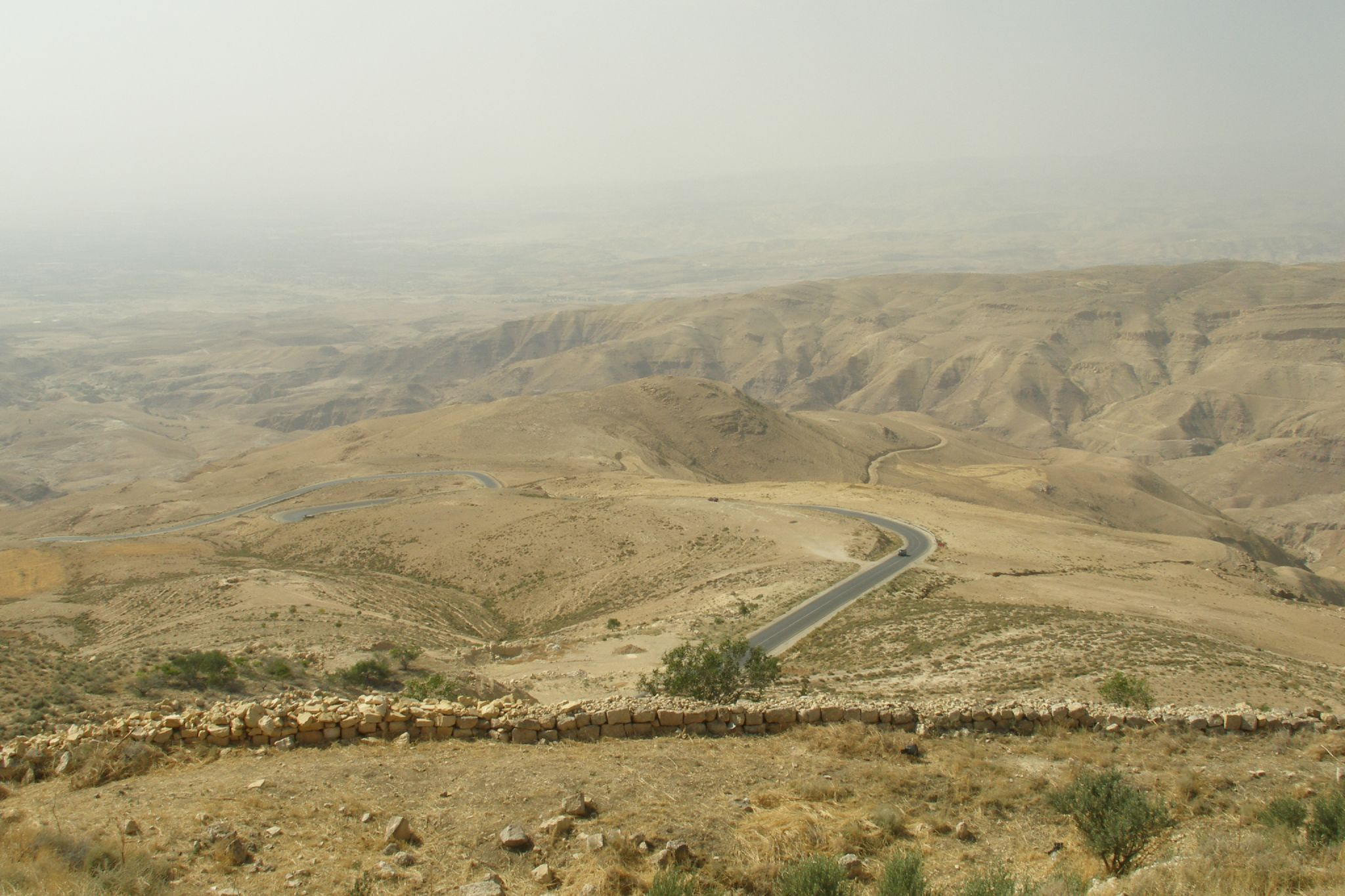
View from Mount Nebo

== See also ==
- Early Byzantine mosaics in the Middle East
- Mount Nebo, Utah
- Mount Pisgah (Bible)
- Nabau
- Nabi Musa
- Michele Piccirillo (archaeologist) (1944–2008), active at Mount Nebo and buried there
