= The Rarest Ballad That Ever Was Seen =

Song

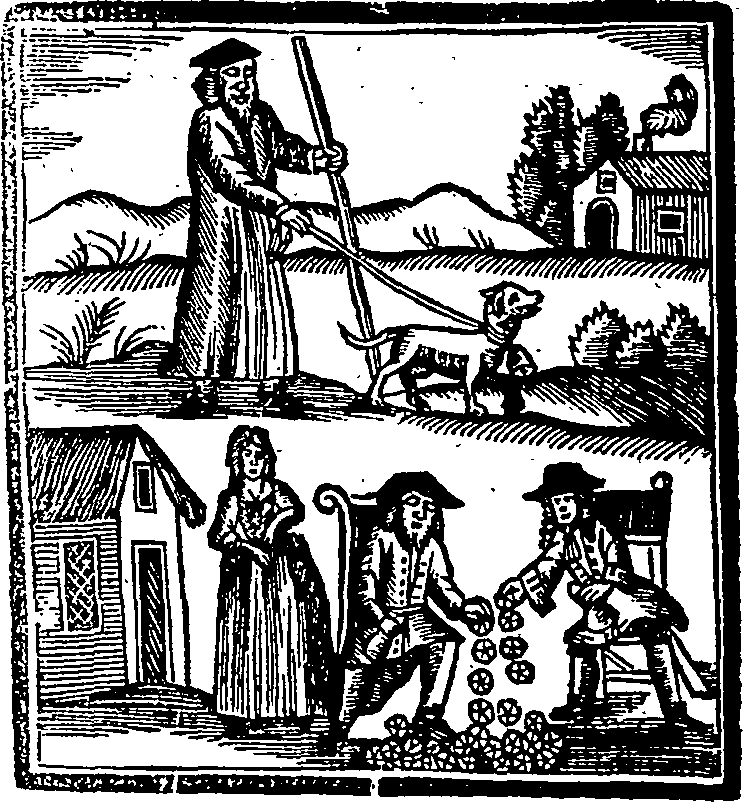
- A fleuron depicting the ballad

Song
- Genre: Broadside ballad

The Rarest Ballad That Ever Was Seen is an English broadside ballad from the late 17th century. It tells the story of a blind beggar's daughter from Bednal-Green and her marriage to a knight.

In the story, the main character Bessee is the most beautiful woman in her town. But she has few marital prospects due to her father's status as a beggar. She eventually gains four suitors, but only the knight among them is willing to marry an impoverished girl. The beggar father turns out to a blinded war veteran with hidden wealth of his own. The father mentions that he served Henry III of England in his wars in France.

In an 18th-century variation of the ballad, Bessee's father is identified as the historical figure Henry de Montfort (1238 –1265), a son of Simon de Montfort, 6th Earl of Leicester. In the ballad, Henry apparently survived his reported death in the Battle of Evesham.

== Synopsis ==
The ballad tells the story of Bessee, the daughter of a blind beggar. She is the most beautiful woman in her town, and has many suitors, but none of their parents will allow them to marry a beggar's daughter. Bessee asks her parents to let her travel and seek her fortunes. She leaves in the night, and when she reaches Stratford at Bow she doesn't know where to go next and starts crying. Finally, she decides to go on to Rumford, where she is entertained at the Kings-Arms. In Rumford, she once again has many suitors, all of whom offer her gold and silver.

Four suitors come calling simultaneously. A knight, a gentleman, a merchant, and her master's son compete for her affections, but she refuses them all, telling them that they must first seek her father's approval. They all agree, until she tells them that her father is the blind beggar, at which point three of them back out. The knight says it doesn't matter, and agrees to return to Bednal-Green with Bessee, even though his kinsman urges him not to go. A number of men from Rumford follow him and fight him, but he wins the battle, with some outside help, and approaches her father. His kinsman begins to rail against Bessee, but her father tells him that he is willing to compare his gold with that of the knight by "dropping angels." He drops 3,000 pounds, more than twice that of the knight, and then adds another 100 for his daughter's gown. When all of her previous suitors see that her father is actually rich, they become angry.

In the second part of the ballad, Bessee and the knight have a huge wedding, and all the noble people are invited. At the wedding, the beggar comes out dressed in fine clothes and playing the lute. The noblemen at the wedding recognize a noble pedigree in his face, and ask the beggar to tell them his story. He agrees by playing one more song. His name is Monfort, and he lost his eyes fighting in France for King Henry III. A woman saved him from dying on the battlefield, and they moved to Bednal-Green and became beggars. Everybody pronounces that Bessee comes from a good pedigree, and they celebrate her marriage to the knight.

== Historical and cultural significance ==
A version of the ballad, called The Blind Beggar's Daughter of Bednal-Green was included in Bishop Thomas Percy's Reliques of Ancient English Poetry, published in 1765. This version of the ballad has a slightly different ending, in which the identity of the beggar is made more explicit. According to Joseph Scott Moore, Percy substituted this ending for the "vulgar" ending in order to reconcile the ballad with "true history." In Percy's version, the beggar tells us that he is Henry de Montfort, son of Simon de Montfort, 6th Earl of Leicester, who was killed in the Battle of Evesham. According to history, Henry was also killed at the Battle of Evesham, but according to the ballad he only lost his eyesight and was saved by a woman who became Bessee's mother. According to Percy's version, the two donned beggars' clothing and moved to England in order to hide from Henry's enemies, who would think he was dead. Moore also argues that alternate versions of the ballad refer to the "Queen's Arms" instead of the "King's Arms," suggesting that it was written in the time of Queen Elizabeth.

Ambrose Philips and Richard Whittington include it in their Collection of Old Ballads, but don't include it as a "historical" ballad because they can't find evidence of any truth in it. They speculate that Montfort was not included in lists of the slain, and that the writer exercised poetic license by creating a fictional story in which Henry survives the battle. They also cite controversy over the identity of Montfort, and whether he served under Henry II or Henry III, suggesting that great men of that name served under both kings. They cite another Montfort who "challenged and overcame" the king's standard-bearer, Henry of Essex, after he was charged with treason for throwing down the royal standard during a battle with Wales.

=== Theatre ===
The story is the source of the 17th-century play, The Blind Beggar of Bednal-Green, with the Merry Humour of Tom Strowd the Norfolk Yeoman, originally published in 1659 by John Day after being performed many times.

The story is also the source of the 16th-century play Faire Em (c. 1590).

=== The Blind Beggar in other areas ===
It gave its name to an English pub, The Blind Beggar, in 1894.

In 1900, the Metropolitan Borough of Bethnal Green adopted a scene from the ballad to be depicted in their official arms. A depiction of the blind beggar has been depicted on the head of the beadle's staff since 1690.
