= Die Auferweckung des Lazarus (Loewe) =

Die Auferweckung des Lazarus is an 1863 oratorio by Carl Loewe. It was the last of his 15 completed oratorios.

== Recording ==
Die Auferweckung Des Lazarus Kölner Rundfunkchor, Kölner Rundfunkorchester, Helmuth Froschauer – Capriccio 2CD 1997
