= Jan Hus (oratorio) =

Oratorio by Carl Loewe and August Zeune

Jan Hus is an oratorio by Carl Loewe to a libretto by August Zeune. It premiered 16 December 1841 with the Berliner Singakademie. In choosing this subject Loewe and Zeune produced the first oratorio based on the theme of the Reformation, preceding Luther in Worms (1876) by Ludwig Meinardus.

The oratorio was revived by the Arcis-Vocalisten in performance at the Sendling Himmelfahrtskirche under Thomas Gropper in October 2022.

== Recordings ==
- Jan Hus op.82 Monika Mauch, Ulrike Malotta, Georg Poplutz (as Jan Hus), Dominik Wörner, Arcis-Vocalisten München, L'arpa festante, Thomas Gropper 2CD Oehms, DDD, 2022
