= Chemosh =

God of the Moabites, mentioned in Bible

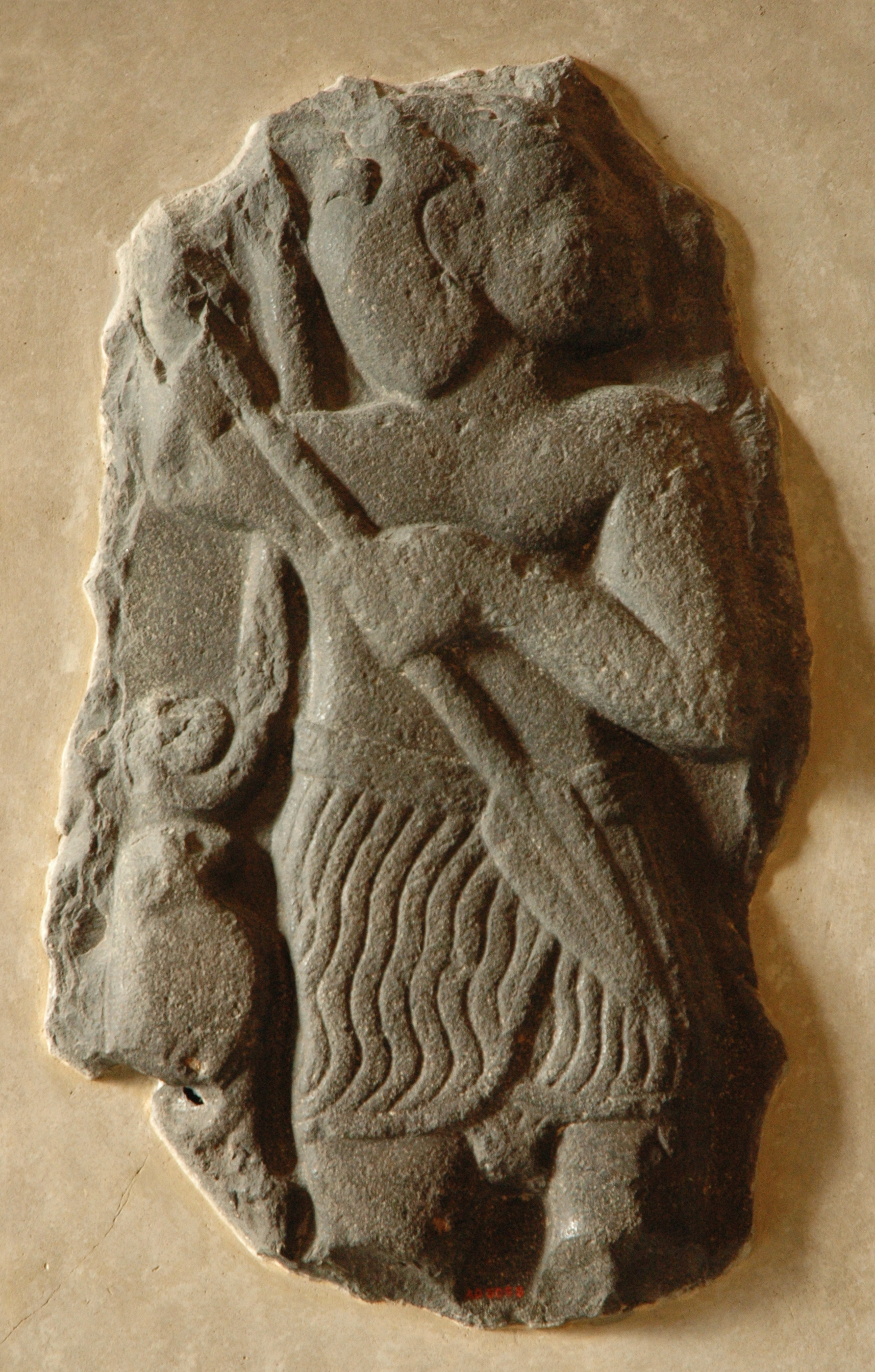
- Possible depiction of Chemosh as a warrior god on the Shihan stele
- Moabite: 𐤊𐤌𐤔; Kamōš
- Venerated in: Moab, Jordan
- Major cult center: Kirioth

Equivalents
- Arabian: ʿAṯtar

Chemosh (Moabite: 𐤊𐤌𐤔, romanized: Kamōš; Biblical Hebrew: כְּמוֹשׁ, romanized: Kəmōš) is a Canaanite deity worshipped by Ancient Semitic-speaking peoples who occupied the region known as Moab, in modern-day Jordan east of the Dead Sea, during the Levantine Bronze and Iron Ages.

Chemosh was the supreme deity of the Canaanite state of Moab and the patron-god of its population, the Moabites, who in consequence were called the "People of Chemosh". The name and significance of Chemosh are historically attested in the Moabite-language inscriptions on the Mesha Stele, dated ca. 840 BCE. Chemosh is also mentioned in the Hebrew Bible.

== Name ==
The name of Chemosh is attested in the Moabite language as 𐤊𐤌𐤔 (kmš), which was pronounced as Kamōš (/kaˈmoːʃ/).

The name of Chemosh is of yet uncertain origin, and it is unclear whether it was related to the name of the Eblaite deity ᴰKamiš (𒀭𒂵𒈪𒅖), or the Ugaritic divine name Ṯiẓẓu-wa-Kamāṯu (𐎘𐎑𐎆𐎋𐎎𐎘) or Ẓiẓẓu-wa-Kamāṯu (𐎑𐎑𐎆𐎋𐎎𐎘), or an epithet of the Mesopotamian god Nergal which might have meant "bull", ᴰKammuš (𒀭𒅗𒄠𒈲).

According to one hypothesis which assumes that the names ᴰKamiš and Kamāṯu, and Kamōš and ᴰKammuš were the same, the first two variants of the name might have been qattil-type substantival participles of B-stem and the latter two variants might have been qattul-type verbal adjectives of D-stem, both meaning "conqueror" and "subduer," thus being related to the Akkadian terms kanāšu (𒅗𒈾𒋗/𒅗𒈾𒋙) and kamāšu (𒅗𒈠𒀀𒋙)/kamāšu (𒅗𒈠𒋢), meaning "to submit to an overlord or to a deity" and "to bend," as well as to the Old South Arabian term hkms (𐩠𐩫𐩣𐩪), meaning "to crush."

Chemosh is mentioned in the Hebrew Bible under the name Kəmōš (כְּמוֹשׁ, vocalized as: [kǝˈmoːʃ]), which was vowelled following to the Hebrew word bəʾôš (בְּאשׁ), lit. 'stench'. The Hebrew form Kəmōš was itself later Romanised as Chemosh (vocalized in English as: /ˈkiːmɒʃ/) in translations of the Bible, while the accurate pronunciation of the name of the god, reflecting the Moabite pronunciation Kamōš, is more accurately recorded in the Septuagint as Khamōs (Χαμώς) and the Vulgate as Chamos.

== History ==
=== Origins ===
The origin of the Moabite deity Chemosh is unclear, although he might possibly have been the same as the Bronze Age-period god from Ebla named ᴰKamiš (𒀭𒂵𒈪𒅖), whose existence has been attested from around c. 2300 BC, thus suggesting that Chemosh might have been an ancient Semitic deity. The significant gap between the attestation of the Eblaite Kamiš during the 23rd century BC and that of the Moabite Chemosh in the 9th century BC, with an absence of any reference to either of these deities in Amorite names from the 21st to the 15th centuries BC, nevertheless make this identification between Kamiš and Chemosh very uncertain.

=== Iron Age ===
In the 9th century BC, Chemosh was the principal god of the Canaanite kingdom of Moab, whose worship was characteristic of the Moabites. The cult of Chemosh appears to have been limited to the Moabites, and his name does not appear in contemporary Ancient North Arabian inscriptions.

During this period itself, Chemosh was identified with ʿAštar (𐤏𐤔𐤕𐤓), who was the Moabite adaptation of the North Arabian god ʿAṯtar, himself a form of the Semitic deity of the planet Venus, ʿAṯtar, in the combined form of ʿAštar-Kamōš (𐤏𐤔𐤕𐤓𐤊𐤌𐤔). The astral role of ʿAštar itself is attested by his mention along with the Moon-God Šaggar in the Deir Alla Inscription, the subject of which is largely the Sun-goddess Šamāš, thus forming a triad of the Sun, Moon, and Venus similarly to the one attested in South Arabia, and suggesting a South Arabian religious influence in Moab.

During the 9th century BC, the kingdom of Moab had been subdued by the kingdom of Israel during the rule of the latter state's kings Omri and Ahab. The 9th century BC Moabite king Mesha, who ascended to the Moabite throne during the reign of Ahab, wrote in his inscriptions (including the Mesha Stele) that the Israelites had been able to subdue Moab because Chemosh was angry with his people, that is the Moabites.

Mesha soon rebelled against Israelite suzerainty and embarked on an expansionist policy against the Israelites, which he carried out as holy war performed as a ritual to Chemosh. After Mesha had captured the Gadite city of Ataroth he slaughtered all of its inhabitants as an accomplishment of a vow he had made to Chemosh and to the population of Moab, and he brought the warden of Ataroth, the Gadite chief Uriel, to Kirioth, where Mesha sacrificed him to Chemosh. When, following his capture of Ataroth, Mesha conquered the town of Nebo, he sacrificed the whole Israelite population of the town to ʿAštar-Chemosh, likely because of ʿAštar's function as an avenger deity who was invoked in curses against enemies, and he brought all the lambs of the sanctuary of Yahweh, at Nebo to the sanctuary of Chemosh, where he sacrificed them to Chemosh.

Mesha recorded in his victory stela that he had built a high place dedicated to Chemosh in the citadel of the Moabite capital of Ḏaybān to thank the god for assuring his triumph in his military campaign against the Israelites.

=== Later periods ===
Chemosh was still worshipped after the Moabite kingdom came to an end, and his name was used as a theophoric element by individuals of Moabite descent living in Egypt and Babylonia. An Aramaic inscription from Al-Karak, and dated from the 3rd century BC, mentions Chemosh.

During the periods of Hellenistic and Roman rule in Moab, Chemosh was identified with the Greek god of war, Ares, due to which Graeco-Roman records called the city of Rabbat Mōʾāb as Areopolis (Ἀρεοπολις), Arsopolis (Ἀρσοπολις), and Arsapolis (Ἀρσαπολις), all meaning "City of Ares."

=== Legacy ===
Chemosh is mentioned in the Hebrew Bible, where he is mentioned as the god of the Ammonites at one point, although he is later referred to as Kəmōš ʾelohē Mōʾāb (כְּמוֹשׁ אֱלֹהֵי מוֹאָב), lit. 'Chemosh, the god of Moab', and later called šiqqūṣ Mōʾāb (שִׁקֻּץ מוֹאָב), lit. 'the abomination of Moab'.

According to the Biblical narrative, the Israelite king Solomon introduced the cults of Astarte, Chemosh and Milcom in east Jerusalem for his foreign concubines, and the later Judahite king Josiah later destroyed the high places of these deities during his reform of the cult of his kingdom.

In the Books of Kings of the Bible, the Moabite king Mesha is alleged to have sacrificed his own son to Chemosh on the wall of his city when faced with a difficult situation in war, after which Chemosh rewarded Mesha by immediately starting to destroy the kingdom of Israel.

The 6th-century BC Judahite prophet Jeremiah later announced that Chemosh as well as his priests and his princes would be exiled.

== Cult ==
=== Functions ===
Chemosh had a martial role, due to which the Moabite king Mesha called him "the subduer of the enemies of Moab", and ascribed to Chemosh his own military victories, and, due to his identification with ʿAštar (𐤏𐤔𐤕𐤓), who was the Arab deity of the planet Venus, Chemosh appears to also have had an astral aspect.

As the patron god of Moab, the Moabites believed that the anger of Chemosh against them would result in their subjugation, and his favour would ensure their independence and victory in war.

Based on the assumption that his name might have been the same as the epithet ᴰKammuš (𒀭𒅗𒄠𒈲) of the Mesopotamian god of the underworld, Nergal, the Moabite god Chemosh might also have had a chthonic aspect.

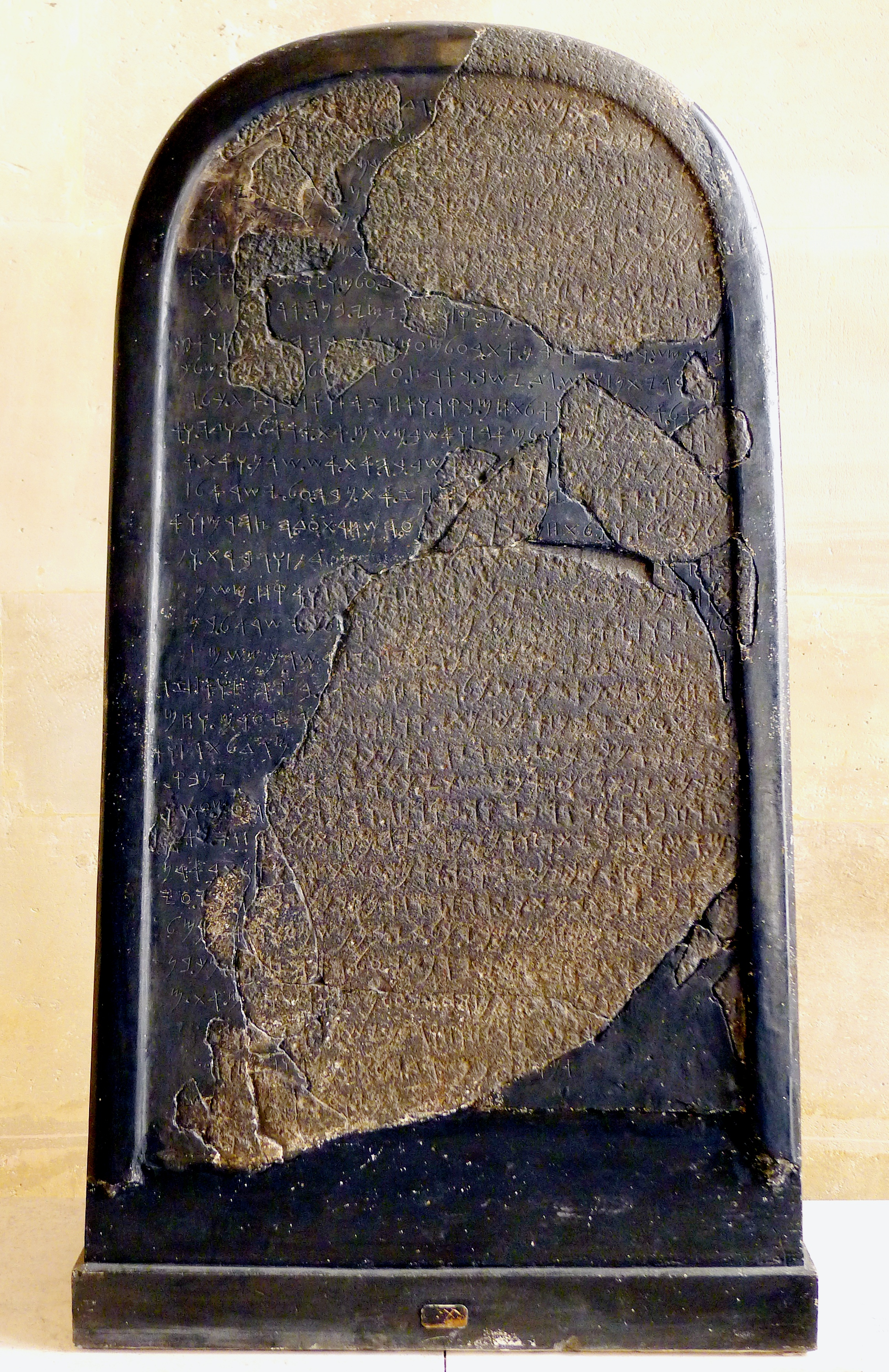
Mesha Stele, erected c. 840 BC in honor of Chemosh

=== Temples ===
The main sanctuary of Chemosh in Moab was likely located in the important Moabite city of Qerīyōt, which is presently a site on a high hill where Iron Age I to II period Moabite remains, including potsherds, have been discovered. An inscription of the Moabite king Mesha mentions the existence of a Bēt Kamōš (𐤁𐤕 𐤊𐤌𐤔), lit. 'House (Temple) of Chemosh'.

Mesha recorded in his victory stela that he had built a high place dedicated to Chemosh in the citadel of the Moabite capital of Ḏaybān to thank the god for assuring his triumph in a military campaign against the Israelites. Hence, Chemosh was referred to as Kmš b-Qrḥh (𐤊𐤌𐤔 𐤁𐤒𐤓𐤇𐤄), lit. 'Chemosh dwelling in the citadel' in the inscription.

Mesha also claimed to have rebuilt the site of Bēt-Bāmōt (𐤁𐤕 𐤁𐤌𐤕), whose name means "House of High Places" and which is called Bāmōt-Baʿal (lit. 'High Places of Baʿal') in Israelite texts such as the Hebrew Bible, thus suggesting that a sanctuary with seven altars existed at this place. This sanctuary's remains have however not yet been discovered, and it is unknown whether the cult of Chemosh was performed there.

=== Hypostases ===
Chemosh was equated with the Semitic high god ʾĒl (𐤀𐤋) in the personal name Kamōš-ʾĒl (𐤊𐤌𐤔𐤀𐤋), meaning "Chemosh is ʾĒl."

==== ʿAštar -Chemosh ====
Chemosh was identified with ʿAštar (𐤏𐤔𐤕𐤓), who was the Moabite adaptation of the North Arabian god ʿAṯtar, himself a form of the Semitic deity of the planet Venus, ʿAṯtar, in the combined form of ʿAštar-Kamōš (𐤏𐤔𐤕𐤓𐤊𐤌𐤔). The astral role of ʿAštar itself is attested by his mention along with the Moon-God Šaggar in the Deir Alla Inscription, the subject of which is largely the Sun-goddess Shamash, thus forming a triad of the Sun, Moon, and Venus similarly to the one attested in South Arabia, and suggesting a South Arabian religious influence in Moab.

In earlier scholarship from the late 19th century, ʿAštar-Chemosh was inaccurately considered to be an independent deity existing separately from Chemosh, and was identified as a form of the Canaanite goddess ʿAštart (𐤏𐤔𐤕𐤓𐤕), although the masculine form of ʿAštar in the god's name shows that ʿAštar-Chemosh was a male deity.

=== Iconography ===
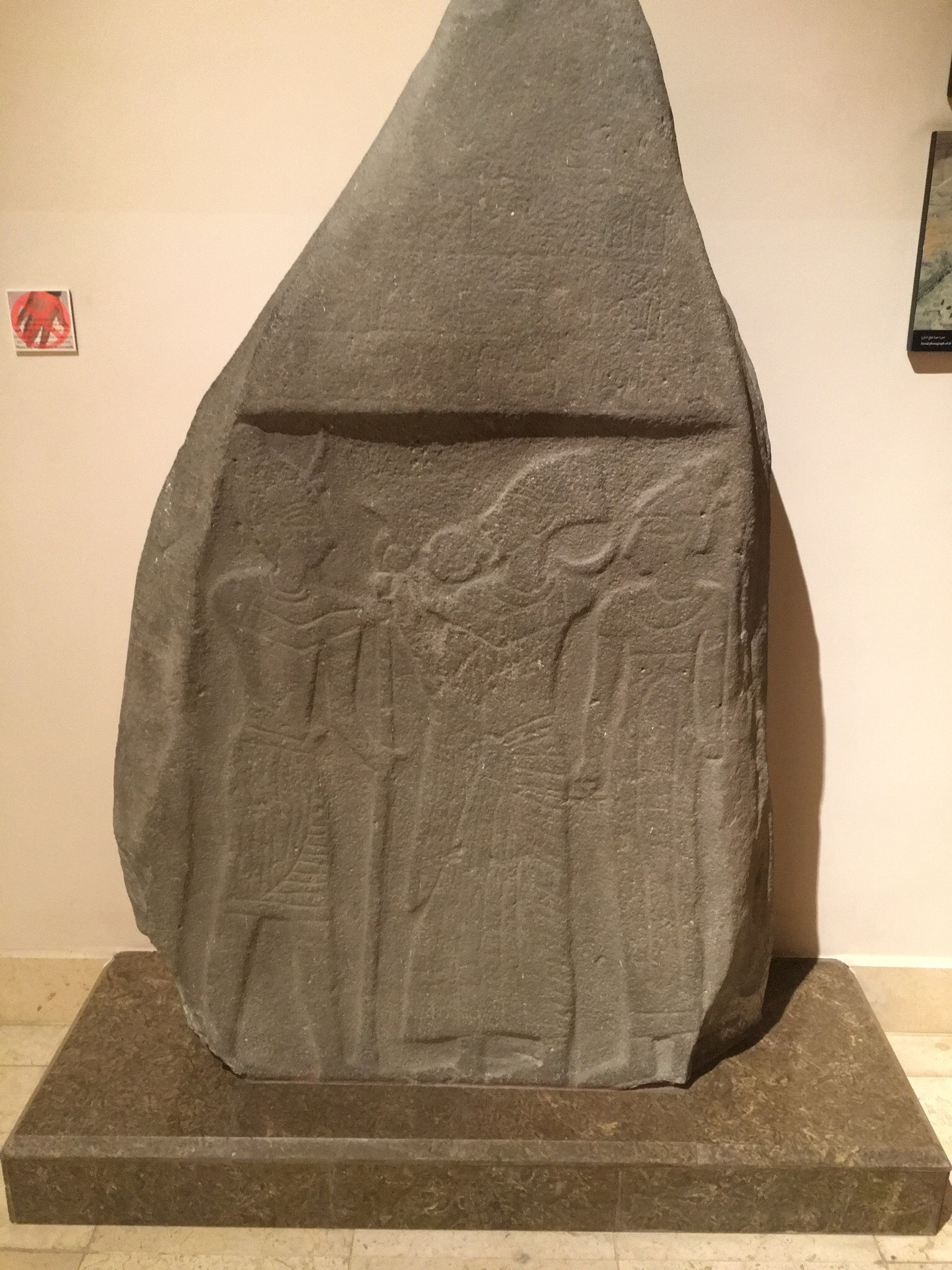
The Al-Balu' Stele, depicting a god, possibly Chemosh, handing a scepter to a Moabite king wearing a Shasu headdress.

Chemosh was likely the masculine deity represented in the Baluʿa Stele, in which he is depicted as handing a sceptre to a Moabite king.

The masculine figure represented on a Moabite stele from Shihan wearing a shendyt and holding a spear might also have been a depiction of Chemosh.

Chemosh might also have been represented in Hellenistic period Moabite coins as an armed figure standing between two torches.

=== Rites ===
==== Human sacrifice ====
The Moabites considered human sacrifice to Chemosh to be necessary to obtain the favour of Chemosh in critical situations, as attested by those performed by the Moabite king Mesha.

One form of human sacrifice to Chemosh was performed by Moabite kings to thank him for the accomplishment of a vow made to him in a military context, that is, in exchange of the Moabites' victory in war, the enemy population defeated in the said war was killed in the name of Chemosh. This is attested when Mesha had embarked on a policy of conquest of Israelite territories in the 9th century BC, and he slaughtered all of the inhabitants of the Gadite city of Ataroth as an accomplishment of a vow he had made to Chemosh.

Enemy populations defeated in war were also directly sacrificed to Chemosh, such as when, following his capture of Ataroth, Mesha conquered the town of Nebo, he sacrificed the whole Israelite population of the town to ʿAštar-Chemosh, likely because of ʿAštar's function as an avenger deity who was invoked in curses against enemies.

The Hebrew Bible claims that Mesha sacrificed his own son to Chemosh on the wall of his city when faced with a difficult situation in war, after which Chemosh rewarded Mesha by immediately starting to destroy the kingdom of Israel. The claim that Mesha sacrificed his son to Chemosh has so far remained unverifiable and is not attested in any Moabite inscription.

==== Animal sacrifice ====
After Mesha conquered Nebo, he brought all the lambs of the sanctuary of Yahweh, the God of his Israelite enemies, at Nebo to the sanctuary of Chemosh, where he sacrificed them to Chemosh.

==== Sanctuary building ====
Moabite kings built sanctuaries for Chemosh to thank him once they had obtained his favour, as attested in the victory stela of Mesha recording that he had built a high place dedicated to Chemosh in the citadel of the Moabite capital of Ḏaybān to thank the god for assuring his triumph in his military campaign against the Israelites.

=== As theophoric element ===
The name of Chemosh appears as a theophoric element in the name of several Moabite kings, such as Kamōš-ayat (𐤊𐤌𐤔𐤉𐤕) or Kamōš-yaton, Kamōš-nadab (𐤊𐤌𐤔𐤍𐤃𐤁), and Kamōš-ʿaśa (𐤊𐤌𐤔𐤏𐤔), as well as in several Moabite personal names recorded in inscriptions, such as:

- Kamōš (𐤊𐤌𐤔) lit. '[the one of] Chemosh'
- Kamōš-ʾĒl (𐤊𐤌𐤔𐤀𐤋), lit. 'Chemosh is ʾĒl' or lit. 'Chemosh is God'
- Kamōš-ʾūr (𐤊𐤌𐤔𐤀𐤓), lit. 'Chemosh is [my] light'
- Kamōš-dān (𐤊𐤌𐤔𐤃𐤍), lit. 'Chemosh is strong' or lit. 'Chemosh has given justice'
- Kamōš-ḥāsād (𐤊𐤌𐤔𐤇𐤎𐤃), lit. 'Chemosh has shown loyalty [to me]'
- Kamōš-yəḥî (𐤊𐤌𐤔𐤉𐤇𐤉), lit. 'Chemosh may live' or lit. 'O Chemosh, may it stay alive!'
- Kamōš-yasūʿ (𐤊𐤌𐤔𐤉𐤎𐤏), lit. 'Chemosh is [my] salvation'
- Kamōš-mūʾaš (𐤊𐤌𐤔𐤌𐤀𐤔), lit. 'Given by Chemosh'
- Kamōš-nātān (𐤊𐤌𐤔𐤍𐤕𐤍), lit. 'Chemosh has given'
- Kamōš-ʿoz (𐤊𐤌𐤔𐤏𐤆), lit. 'Chemosh is [my] protection'
- Kamōš-ʿam (𐤊𐤌𐤔𐤏𐤌), lit. 'Chemosh is the [divine] uncle'
- Kmš-plṭ (𐤊𐤌𐤔𐤐𐤋𐤈), lit. 'Chemosh has saved'
- Kamōš-ṣādāq (𐤊𐤌𐤔𐤑𐤃𐤒), lit. 'Chemosh is righteous' or lit. 'Chemosh has given justice')
- Kamōš-šūāʿ (𐤊𐤌𐤔𐤅𐤏), lit. 'Chemosh is [my] salvation'
- Šiqquṣ-Kamōš (𐤔𐤒𐤑𐤊𐤌𐤔), 'Tabu (Exclusive Property) of Chemosh'

== Sources ==
- Barton, George Aaron (1907). "Chemosh". In Adler, Cyrus; Deutsch, Gotthard; Ginzberg, Louis; Gottheil, Richard; Hirsch, Emil G.; Jacobs, Joseph; Kohler, Kaufmann; Rosenthal, Herman; Schechter, Solomon; Singer, Isidore; Toy, Crawford H.; Funk, Isaac K.; Vizetelly, Frank H.; Popper, William; Singer, Isidore (eds.). The Jewish Encyclopedia: A Descriptive Record of the History, Religion, Literature, and Customs of the Jewish People from the Earliest Times to the Present Day. Vol. 4. New York City, United States; London, United Kingdom: Funk & Wagnalls. pp. 9-10.
- Beyer, Klaus [in German] (2011). "The Languages of Transjordan". In Gzella, Holger (ed.). Languages from the World of the Bible. Berlin, Germany: Walter de Gruyter. pp. 111–127. doi:10.1515/9781934078631.111. ISBN 978-1-934-07863-1.
- Lipiński, Edward (1975). Studies in Aramaic Inscriptions and Onomastics. Orientalia Lovaniensia analecta. Vol. 1. Leuven, Belgium: Leuven University Press. ISBN 978-9-061-86019-8.
- Lipiński, Edward (2000). The Aramaeans: Their Ancient History, Culture, Religion. Orientalia Lovaniensia analecta. Vol. 100. Leuven, Belgium: Peeters Publishers. ISBN 978-9-042-90859-8.
- Lipiński, Edward (2006). On the Skirts of Canaan in the Iron Age: Historical and Topographical Researches. Orientalia Lovaniensia analecta. Vol. 153. Leuven, Belgium: Peeters Publishers. ISBN 978-9-042-91798-9.
- Müller, H.P. (1999). "Chemosh". In van der Toorn, Karel; Becking, Bob; van der Horst, Pieter W. (eds.). Dictionary of Deities and Demons in the Bible. Boston, United States; Cambridge, United Kingdom; Grand Rapids, Michigan, United States; Köln, Germany; Leiden, Netherlands: Brill Publishers; William B. Eerdmans Publishing Company. pp. 186–189. ISBN 978-0-802-82491-2.
- Albertz, Rainer [in German]; Schmitt, Rüdiger (2012). Family and Household Religion in Ancient Israel and the Levant. Winona Lake, United States: Eisenbrauns. ISBN 978-1-575-06668-4.
- Weippert, Manfred [in German] (2010). "Mesa von Moab im Kampf mit Israel und Juda (9. Jahrhundert)" [Mesha of Moab in War Against Israel and Judah (9th century)]. Historisches Textbuch zum Alten Testament [Historican Textbook of the Old Testament]. Göttingen, Germany: Vandenhoeck & Ruprecht. pp. 242–248. ISBN 978-3-647-51693-6.
- Weippert, Manfred [in German] (1997). "Moab". In Edzard, Dietz Otto; Calmeyer, P.; Postgate, J. N.; Röllig, W. [in German]; von Soden, W.; Stol, M.; Wilhelm, G.; Frantz-Szabó, Gabriella (eds.). Reallexikon der Assyriologie und vorderasiatischen Archäologie (in German). Vol. 8. Berlin, Germany; New York City, United States: Walter de Gruyter. pp. 318–325. ISBN 978-3-110-14809-1.
