= God in Judaism =

Jewish conception of God

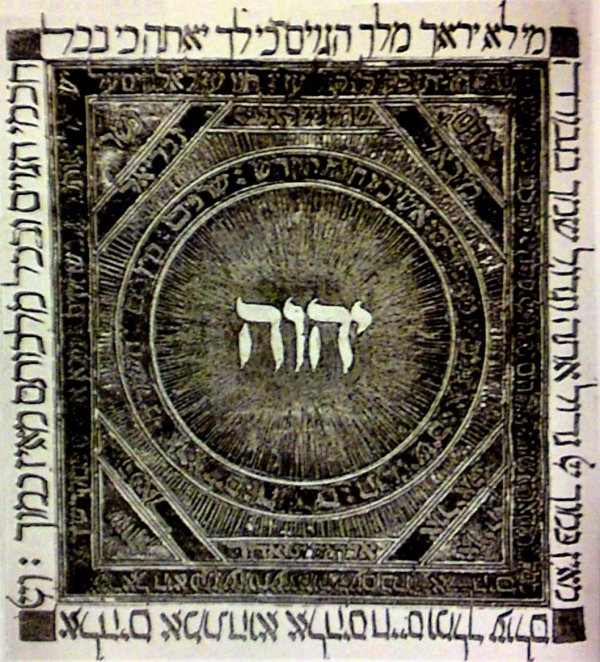
The Tetragrammaton (YHWH), the main Hebrew name of God inscribed on the page of a Sephardic manuscript of the Hebrew Bible (1385)

In Judaism, God has been conceived in a variety of ways. Traditionally, Judaism holds that God—that is, the God of Abraham, Isaac and Jacob, and the national god of the Israelites—delivered the Israelites from slavery in Egypt, and gave them the Law of Moses at Mount Sinai as described in the Torah. Jews believe in a monotheistic conception of God ("God is one"), characterized by both transcendence (independence from, and separation from, the material universe) and immanence (active involvement in the material universe).

God is seen as unique and perfect, free from all faults, incorporeal, and is believed to be omnipotent, omnipresent, omniscient, and unlimited in all attributes, with no partner or equal, serving as the sole creator of everything in existence. In Judaism, God is never portrayed in any image. The names of God used most often in the Hebrew Bible are the un-pronounced Tetragrammaton (Hebrew: יהוה, romanized: YHWH) and Elohim. Other names used to refer to God in traditional Judaism include Adonai, El-Elyon, El Shaddai, and Shekhinah.

According to the rationalistic Jewish theology articulated by the Medieval Jewish philosopher and jurist Moses Maimonides, which later came to dominate much of official and traditional Jewish thought, God is understood as the absolute, indivisible, and incomparable being who is the creator deity—the cause and preserver of all existence. Traditional interpretations of Judaism generally emphasize that God is personal yet also transcendent and able to intervene in the world, while some modern interpretations of Judaism emphasize that God is an impersonal force or ideal rather than a supernatural being concerned with the universe.

== Names ==
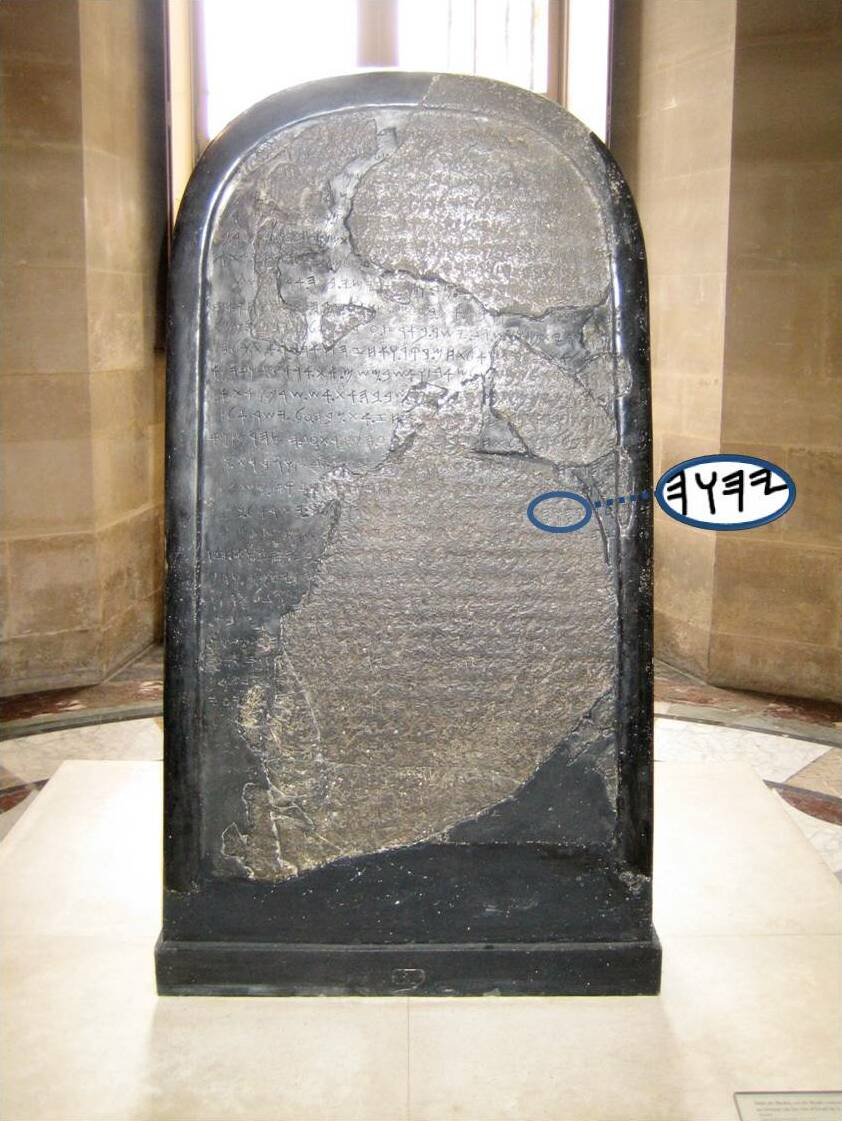
The Mesha Stele bears the earliest known reference (840 BCE) to the Israelite god YHWH.

The name of God used most often in the Hebrew Bible is the Tetragrammaton (Hebrew: יהוה, romanized: YHWH). Jews traditionally do not pronounce it, and instead refer to God as HaShem, literally "the Name". In prayer, the Tetragrammaton is substituted with the pronunciation Adonai, meaning "My Lord", as demonstrated in a common translation of the Shema: "Hear O Israel: the LORD is our God, the LORD is One" (Deuteronomy 6:4). The correct pronunciation of the Tetragrammaton was lost from Jewish tradition during the Middle Ages, though current scholarly consensus outside of Jewish tradition generally reconstructs the name's original pronunciation as "Yahweh". In fundamentalist interpretations of Judaism, God is always referred to with masculine grammatical articles only.

== Properties attributed to God ==
In modern articulations of traditional Judaism, God has been speculated to be the eternal, omnipotent, and omniscient creator of the universe, as well as the source for one's standards of morality, guiding humanity through ethical principles.

=== Creative ===
Maimonides describes God in this fashion: "The foundation of all foundations and the pillar of wisdom is to know that there is a Primary Being who brought into being all existence. All the beings of the heavens, the earth, and what is between them came into existence only from the truth of His being."

=== Omniscient ===
Jews often describe God as omniscient, although some prominent medieval Jewish philosophers held that God does not have complete foreknowledge of human acts. Gersonides, for example, argued that God knows the choices open to each individual, but that God does not know the choices that an individual will make. Abraham ibn Daud believed that God was not omniscient or omnipotent with respect to human action.

=== Omnipotent ===
Jews often describe God as omnipotent, and see that idea as rooted in the Hebrew Bible. Some modern Jewish theologians have argued that God is not omnipotent, however, and have found many biblical and classical sources to support this view. The traditional view is that God has the power to intervene in the world.

=== Omnipresent ===
"That the Lord, He is God in heaven above and upon the earth beneath" (Deut. 4.39) Maimonides infers from this verse that the Holy One is omnipresent and therefore incorporeal, for a corporeal being is incapable of being in two places simultaneously.

=== Incorporeal and non-gendered ===
"To whom will ye liken me, that I should be equal?" (Isa. 40,25) Maimonides infers from this verse that, "had He been corporeal, He would be like other bodies".

Although God is referred to in the Tanakh with masculine imagery and grammatical forms, traditional Jewish philosophy does not attribute gender to God. Although Jewish aggadic literature and Jewish mysticism do on occasion refer to God using gendered language, for poetic or other reasons, this language was never understood by Jews to imply that God is gender-specific.

Some modern Jewish thinkers take care to articulate God outside of the gender binary, a concept seen as not applicable to God.

Kabbalistic tradition holds that emanations from the divine consist of ten aspects, called sefirot.

=== Unimaginable ===
The Torah ascribes some human features to God, however, other Jewish religious works describe God as formless and otherworldly. Judaism is aniconic, meaning it lacks material, physical representations of both the natural and supernatural worlds. Furthermore, the worship of idols is strictly forbidden. The traditional view, elaborated by figures such as Maimonides, reckons that God is wholly incomprehensible and therefore impossible to envision, resulting in an historical tradition of "divine incorporeality". As such, attempting to describe God's "appearance" in practical terms is considered disrespectful, and possibly heretical.

== Conceptions of God ==
=== Personal ===
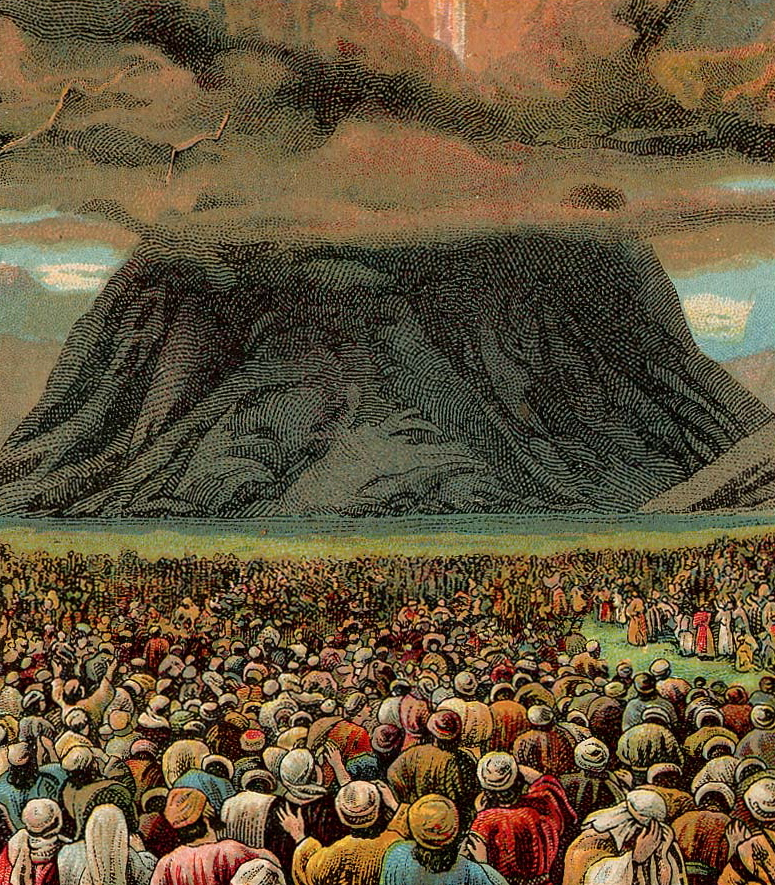
The mass revelation at Mount Horeb in an illustration from a Bible card published by the Providence Lithograph Company, 1907

Most of classical Judaism views God as a personal god and as a national god, meaning that individual humans and the nation of Israel both have a relationship with God and vice versa. Rabbi Samuel S. Cohon wrote that "God as conceived by Judaism is not only the First Cause, the Creative Power, and the World Reason, but also the living and loving Father of Men. He is not only cosmic but also personal....Jewish monotheism thinks of God in terms of definite character or personality, while pantheism is content with a view of God as impersonal." This is shown in the Jewish liturgy, such as in the Adon Olam hymn, which includes a "confident affirmation" that "He is my God, my living God...Who hears and answers." Edward Kessler writes that Hebrew Bible "portrays an encounter with a God who cares passionately and who addresses humanity in the quiet moments of its existence." British chief rabbi Jonathan Sacks suggests that God "is not distant in time or detached, but passionately engaged and present".

The word "personal", as applied to God in Judaism, does not connote that God is corporeal or anthropomorphic, views that Jewish sages rejected; rather, "personality" refers not to a physical body, but to "inner essence, psychical, rational, and moral". However, some non-traditional Jewish texts, for example, the Shi'ur Qomah of the Heichalot literature, describe the measurements of limbs and body parts of God.

Jews believe that "God can be experienced" but also that "God cannot be understood", because "God is utterly unlike humankind" (as shown in God's response to Moses when Moses asked for God's name: "I Am that I Am"). Anthropomorphic statements about God "are understood as linguistic metaphors, otherwise it would be impossible to talk about God at all".

A notion that God is in need of human beings has been propounded by Abraham Joshua Heschel. Because God is in search of people, God is accessible and available through time and place to whoever seeks God, leading to a spiritual intensity for the individual as well. This accessibility leads to a God who is present, involved, near, intimate, and concerned for and vulnerable to what happens in this world.

=== Non-personal ===
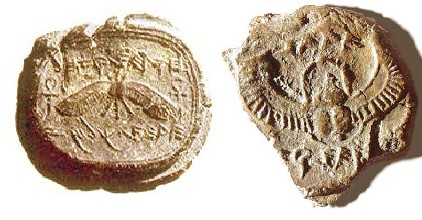
Seal of Hezekiah, 727 to 698. Winged disk representing God

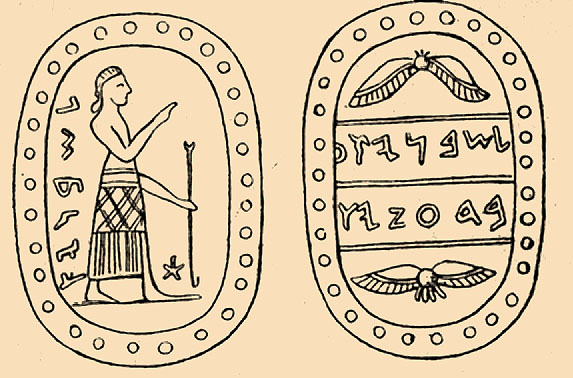
Winged disk reproduced in the Jewish Encyclopedia 1906

Modern Jewish thinkers claim that there is an "alternate stream of tradition exemplified by ... Maimonides", who, along with several other Jewish philosophers, rejected the idea of a personal God. According to the Pew Forum on Religion and Public Life's 2008 U.S. Religious Landscape Survey, Americans who identify as Jewish by religion are twice as likely to favor ideas of God as "an impersonal force" over the idea that "God is a person with whom people can have a relationship".

Modern Jewish thinkers who have rejected the idea of a personal God have sometimes affirmed that God is nature, the ethical ideal, or a force or process in the world.

Baruch Spinoza offers a pantheist view of God. In his thought, God is everything and everything is God. Thus, there can be conceived no substance but God. In this model, one can speak of God and nature interchangeably. Although Spinoza was excommunicated from the Jewish community of Amsterdam, Spinoza's concept of God was revived by later Jews, especially Israeli secular Zionists.

Hermann Cohen rejected Spinoza's idea that God can be found in nature, but agreed that God was not a personal being. Rather, he saw God as an ideal, an archetype of morality. Not only can God not be identified with nature, but God is also incomparable to anything in the world. This is because God is "One", unique and unlike anything else. One loves and worships God through living ethically and obeying His moral law: "love of God is love of morality."

Similarly, for Emmanuel Levinas, God is ethics, so one is brought closer to God when justice is rendered to the Other. This means that one experiences the presence of God through one's relation to other people. To know God is to know what must be done, so it does not make sense to speak of God as what God is, but rather what God commands.

For Mordecai Kaplan, the founder of Reconstructionist Judaism, God is not a person, but rather a force within the universe that is experienced; in fact, anytime something worthwhile is experienced, that is God. God is the sum of all natural processes that allow people to be self-fulfilling, the power that makes for salvation. Thus, Kaplan's God is abstract, not carnate, and intangible. In this model, God exists within this universe; for Kaplan, there is nothing supernatural or otherworldly. One loves this God by seeking out truth and goodness. Kaplan does not view God as a person but acknowledges that using personal God-language can help people feel connected to their heritage and can act as "an affirmation that life has value".

Likewise, Rabbi Zalman Schachter-Shalomi, the founder of the Jewish Renewal movement, views God as a process. To aid in this transition in language, he uses the term "godding", which encapsulates God as a process, as the process that the universe is doing, has been doing, and will continue to do. This term means that God is emerging, growing, adapting, and evolving with creation. Despite this, conventional God-language is still useful in nurturing spiritual experiences and can be a tool to relate to the infinite, although it should not be confused with the real thing.

=== Rationalistic conception ===
In the philosophy of Maimonides and other Jewish-rationalistic philosophers, there is little which can be known about God, other than God's existence, and even this can only be asserted equivocally.

How then can a relation be represented between God and what is other than God when there is no notion comprising in any respect both of the two, inasmuch as existence is, in our opinion, affirmed of God, may God be exalted, and of what is other than God merely by way of absolute equivocation. There is, in truth, no relation in any respect between God and any of God's creatures.

— Maimonides, Moreh Nevuchim (Pines 1963)

Maimonides borrowed from Avicenna's conception of God as the being that exists necessarily and therefore grounds the existence of all contingent beings, while rejecting Aristotle's conception of God as the unmoved mover. He also rejected Avicenna and Aristotle’s belief in the eternity of the world.

=== Kabbalistic conception ===
In Kabbalistic thought, the term "Godhead" usually refers to the concept of Ein Sof (אין סוף), which is the aspect of God that lies beyond the ten emanations or attributes (sephirot). The ten attributes are considered to be a dynamic and organic unity whose nature depends on humanity. The "knowability" of the Godhead in Kabbalistic thought is no better than what is conceived by rationalist thinkers. As Jacobs (1973) puts it, "Of God as God is in Godself—Ein Sof—nothing can be said at all, and no thought can reach there".

Ein Sof is a place to which forgetting and oblivion pertain. Why? Because concerning all the sefirot, one can search out their reality from the depth of supernal wisdom. From there it is possible to understand one thing from another. However, concerning Ein Sof, there is no aspect anywhere to search or probe; nothing can be known of it, for it is hidden and concealed in the mystery of absolute nothingness.

— David ben Judah Hehasid, Matt (1990)

== See also ==
- Conceptions of God
- Ethical monotheism
- Existence of God
- God in Abrahamic religions
- God-fearer
- Holocaust theology
- Holy Spirit in Judaism
- Names of God in Judaism
- Origins of Judaism
- Seven Laws of Noah
- Shituf
- Thirteen Attributes of Mercy

== Bibliography ==
- Betz, Arnold Gottfried (2000). "Monotheism". In Freedman, David Noel; Myer, Allen C. (eds.). Eerdmans Dictionary of the Bible. Grand Rapids, Michigan: Wm. B. Eerdmans. pp. 916–917. ISBN 978-90-5356-503-2.
- Day, John (2002). Yahweh and the Gods and Goddesses of Canaan. Journal for the Study of the Old Testament: Supplement Series. Vol. 265. Sheffield: Sheffield Academic Press. doi:10.2307/3217888. ISBN 978-0-567-53783-6. JSTOR 3217888. S2CID 161791734.
- Gruber, Mayer I. (2013). "Israel". In Spaeth, Barbette Stanley (ed.). The Cambridge Companion to Ancient Mediterranean Religions. New York: Cambridge University Press. pp. 76–94. doi:10.1017/CCO9781139047784.007. ISBN 978-0-521-11396-0. LCCN 2012049271.
- Moberly, R. W. L. (1990). ""Yahweh is One": The Translation of the Shema". In Emerton, J. A. (ed.). Studies in the Pentateuch. Vetus Testamentum: Supplements. Vol. 41. Leiden: Brill Publishers. pp. 209–215. doi:10.1163/9789004275645_012. ISBN 978-90-04-27564-5.
- Niehr, Herbert (1995). "The Rise of YHWH in Judahite and Israelite Religion: Methodological and Religio-Historical Aspects". In Edelman, Diana Vikander (ed.). The Triumph of Elohim: From Yahwisms to Judaisms. Leuven: Peeters Publishers. pp. 45–72. ISBN 978-90-5356-503-2. OCLC 33819403.
- Smith, Mark S. (2000). "El". In Freedman, David Noel; Myer, Allen C. (eds.). Eerdmans Dictionary of the Bible. Grand Rapids, Michigan: Wm. B. Eerdmans. pp. 384–386. ISBN 978-90-5356-503-2.
- Smith, Mark S. (2003). "El, Yahweh, and the Original God of Israel and the Exodus". The Origins of Biblical Monotheism: Israel's Polytheistic Background and the Ugaritic Texts. Oxford: Oxford University Press. pp. 133–148. doi:10.1093/019513480X.003.0008. ISBN 978-0-19-513480-3.
- Smith, Mark S. (2017). "YHWH's Original Character: Questions about an Unknown God". In Van Oorschot, Jürgen; Witten, Markus (eds.). The Origins of Yahwism. Beihefte zur Zeitschrift für die alttestamentliche Wissenschaft. Vol. 484. Berlin and Boston: De Gruyter. pp. 23–44. doi:10.1515/9783110448221-002. ISBN 978-3-11-042538-3. S2CID 187378834.
- Van der Toorn, Karel (1999). "God (I)". In Van der Toorn, Karel; Becking, Bob; Van der Horst, Pieter W. (eds.). Dictionary of Deities and Demons in the Bible (2nd ed.). Leiden: Brill Publishers. pp. 352–365. doi:10.1163/2589-7802_DDDO_DDDO_Godi. ISBN 978-90-04-11119-6.
- Van der Horst, Pieter W. (1999). "God (II)". In Van der Toorn, Karel; Becking, Bob; Van der Horst, Pieter W. (eds.). Dictionary of Deities and Demons in the Bible (2nd ed.). Leiden: Brill Publishers. pp. 365–370. doi:10.1163/2589-7802_DDDO_DDDO_Godii. ISBN 978-90-04-11119-6.
