= Runia =

Runia is a surname. Notable people with the surname include:

- David T. Runia (born 1951), Australian academic
- Klaas Runia (1926–2006), Dutch theologian, churchman, and journalist
