= Jaap Mansfeld =

Dutch professor of Greek philosophy (born 1936)

Jaap Mansfeld (born 1936) is a Dutch Emeritus Professor of philosopher and a historian of philosophy.

== Life ==
Jaap Mansfeld began his studies in 1954 at the University of Utrecht, where he received his doctorate in 1964 with a thesis on Parmenides. From 1973 until his retirement in 2001 he was a professor of ancient philosophy, and subsequently professor of History of Ancient and Medieval Philosophy, at Utrecht University. He has been a full member of the Academia Europaea since 1989, as well as a member of the board for several scholarly journals. In 1991 he was elected a member of the Royal Netherlands Academy of Arts and Sciences. A book was published in honour of his 60th birthday in 1996 by Keimpe Algra, Pieter Willem van der Horst, and David T. Runia. In 1998, Mansfeld was awarded the Humboldt research award for his outstanding achievements in research and teaching. Mansfeld was made an honorary citizen of the ancient city of Elea, the town of Parmenides, by the Eleatica conference in 2013.

Mansfeld's focus is on doxography, and he has had a thirty-year collaboration with David Theunis Runia on the fragments and testimonia of the doxographer Aëtios.

== Select publications ==
- Die Offenbarung des Parmenides und die menschliche Welt (PhD). University of Utrecht. 1964. OCLC 1329868.
- The pseudo-Hippocratic tract Peri hebdomadōn. Ch. 1-11 and Greek philosophy. Assen: Van Gorcum. 1971. ISBN 9023207017.
- Die Vorsokratiker : griech.-dt. / 1. Milesier, Pythagoreer, Xenophanes, Heraklit, Parmenides. - 1983. - 336 S. Stuttgart: Reclam. 1983. ISBN 3-15-007965-9.
- Die Vorsokratiker II: Zenon, Empedokles, Anaxagoras, Leukipp, Demokrit. Stuttgart: Reclam. 1987. ISBN 3-15-010344-4.
- Die Vorsokratiker : Griechisch/Deutsch. Ditzingen: Reclam, Philipp. 2011. ISBN 978-3-15-010730-0. With Oliver Primavesi
- Studies in Later Greek Philosophy and Gnosticism. Variorum Reprints. 1989. ISBN 978-0-86078-240-7.
- Studies in the historiography of Greek philosophy. Assen, the Netherlands: Van Gorcum. 1990. ISBN 9789023224037.
- Prolegomena Mathematica: From Apollonius of Perga to Late Neoplatonism : With an Appendix on Pappus and the History of Platonism. BRILL. 1998. ISBN 978-90-04-11267-4.
- Aëtiana : the method and intellectual context of a doxographer. with David Theunis, in five volumes.
  - Volume 1: The Sources. Leiden: E.J. Brill. 1997. ISBN 90-04-10580-8.
  - Volume 2: The Compendium. Leiden: E.J. Brill. 2009. ISBN 978-90-04-17206-7.
  - Volume 3: Studies in the Doxographical Traditions of Ancient Philosophy. Leiden: E.J. Brill. 2010. ISBN 978-90-04-18041-3.
  - Volume 4: Towards an Edition of the Aëtian Placita: Papers of the Melbourne Conference, 1–3 December 2015. Leiden: E.J. Brill. 2018. ISBN 978-90-04-36145-4.
  - Volume 5: An Edition of the reconstructed text of the Placita with a commentary and a collection of related texts. Leiden: E.J. Brill. 2020. ISBN 978-90-04-42838-6.

== Literature ==
- Algra, Keimpe; van der Horst, Pieter W.; Runia, David Theunis, eds. (1996). Polyhistor : studies in the history and historiography of ancient philosophy : presented to Jaap Mansfeld on his sixtieth birthday. Leiden: E.J. Brill. ISBN 90-04-10417-8.
