= Han Baltussen =

Dutch classicist and historian

Han Baltussen FAHA
- Born: Johannes Nicolaas Marie Baltussen; Maastricht, Netherlands

Academic background
- Education: Utrecht University (BA; MA; PhD)
- Thesis: Theophrastus on Theories of Perception: Argument and Purpose in the De Sensibus (1993)
- Doctoral advisor: Jaap Mansfeld; Hans Gottschalk

Academic work
- Discipline: Classics; ancient philosophy
- Sub-discipline: Ancient philosophical commentary; consolation; self-consolation
- Institutions: Utrecht University; King's College London; University College London; University of Adelaide; Adelaide University
- Website: University profile

Johannes Nicolaas Marie Baltussen is a Dutch classicist and historian of ancient philosophy. His research focuses on ancient philosophical commentary, the transmission of intellectual traditions, and consolation in Greco-Roman literature. He held the Walter W. Hughes Professorship of Classics at the University of Adelaide from 2011 to 2025 and subsequently became emeritus professor of Classics and Ancient Thought at Adelaide University.

Baltussen was born in Maastricht, and studied ancient Greek and Latin in college. He did his studies in Classics, gaining his Bachelor of Arts, Master of Arts, and his Doctor of Philosophy in Ancient Philosophy from Utrecht University in 1993. He focused on Theophrastus' views on theories of perception during his PhD studies with supervision by Jaap Mansfeld and Hans Gottschalk.

Baltussen was a postdoctoral fellow for the project Early Stoics at Utrecht between 1993 and 1996. He later became a fellow of the Center for Hellenic Studies at Harvard University. Baltussen was involved in the Ancient Commentators on Aristotle Project at King's College London from 1997 to 2002 and taught ancient Greek philosophy at that institution. He joined the University of Adelaide in 2002. Baltuss was Head of Classics from 2009 to 2013. Baltussen became Walter W. Hughes Professor of Classics in 2011. He was co-editor of Antichthon from 2015 to 2021.

== Early life and education ==
Johannes Nicolaas Marie Baltussen was born in Maastricht, Netherlands. He attended Henric van Veldeke College where he specialised in ancient Greek and Latin before moving to Utrecht University. In university, he obtained his Bachelor of Arts in Classics between 1978 and 1983, while his Master of Arts in Classics between 1983 and 1986.

Baltussen went on to study Ancient Philosophy from the same university in 1988, obtaining his Doctor of Philosophy in 1993. He authored his thesis on Theophrastus on Theories of Perception: Argument and Purpose in the De Sensibus. It was an investigation into Theophrastus dialectical defence of theories of perception. It was co-supervised by Jaap Mansfeld of Utrecht and Hans Gottschalk of the University of Leeds.

== Academic career ==
Between 1993 and 1996, Baltussen was a post-doctoral research associate at Utrecht University, working on the Early Stoics Project. After that, he worked at the Center for Hellenic Studies at Harvard University in Washington, D.C., as a post-doctoral research fellow between 1996 and 1997.

Between 1997 and 2002, Baltussen participated in the Ancient Commentators on Aristotle Project as a research associate and chief assistant editor at King's College London (KCL). He lectured on ancient Greek philosophy as a visiting lecturer and tutor at KCL between 1998 and 2002. An updated version of his doctoral dissertation was published by Brill in 2000. In 2001, Baltussen also acted as an adjunct lecturer in Greek philosophy at University College London.

Baltussen came to the University of Adelaide in late 2002 after Paul Tuffin retired. Among the courses that he had to organise initially were first-year courses in translation and the ancient philosophy course. From 2003, Baltussen organised the Galatis/Moraïtis seminars, which consisted of public lectures and departmental prize-giving ceremonies. Also from 2003 until 2026, he was a representative of Adelaide on the executive board of the Australasian Society for Classical Studies (ASCS).

Since 2004, Baltussen has been working on the topic of psychotherapy and philosophical consolation in antiquity. He has been a member of the Faculty Library Committee of the university between 2004 and 2008. In 2005, Baltussen got a promotion to Level B and created a new course named Ancient Science, Technology and Medicine. He received a fellowship at the Institute for Advanced Study in Princeton in 2006.

The promotion to Level C took place in 2007 and that year he gave Galatis lecture. He held an Australian Research Council fellowship for the research project titled Psychotherapy and the Consolation of Philosophy in Antiquity in 2007 and 2008. In 2009, Baltussen became Head of Classics at Adelaide, a post which he held till 2013, and the ancient science subject was changed to From Hippocrates to Harvey: Ancient Medicine and Its Legacy. He was also a member of the Faculty Research Committee of the university from 2009 to 2014.

Baltussen was made an associate professor in January 2010 and became the president of the Classical Association of South Australia in that year. He got a Faculty Research Award and a fellowship from the Royal Flemish Academy of Belgium in Brussels. Along with Peter J. Davis, Baltussen got a research grant for The Dynamics of Censorship in Antiquity.

Baltussen was nominated as Walter W. Hughes Professor of Classics in 2011 for the chair that was vacant since 1992. He occupied this position until 2025. Between 2011 and 2020, Baltussen was also a member of the advisory board of the Barr Smith B. Cowan Scholarship Committee.

In January 2013, Baltussen was appointed as the coordinator of Adelaide's BA (Advanced) program. He held this position until 2017. Baltussen conducted research on consolation which led to the publication of an edited volume in 2013 as well as public lectures and research on shifting attitudes about death and mourning. Subsequently, this research evolved into an interest in self-consolation.

In 2014, Baltussen held a Spinoza Fellowship at the Leiden University Centre for the Arts in Society. He was a member of the School of Humanities Research Committee at the University of Adelaide from 2014 until 2019 as well as the Executive Council of the Australian Academy of the Humanities from 2014 until 2016. Baltussen delivered a keynote lecture in Berlin on 29 October 2014 on ancient Greek commentators on Aristotle.

Baltussen became the co-editor of Antichthon together with Arthur Pomeroy in 2015. He was in charge of Greek material and remained in his position as an editor until 2021. He lectured on Galen of Pergamum for the Greek Orthodox Community of Melbourne on 28 May 2015. Baltussen became an editorial board member of Studies in Late Antiquity in 2016 and of Rutgers University Studies in the Classical Humanities in 2017. He became a visiting professor at the University of Western Australia and the head of the Classics Section of the Australian Academy of the Humanities in 2017. Baltussen remained the head of the section until 2020.

In 2018, Baltussen was a member of the Excellence in Research for Australia Research Evaluation Committee for Humanities and Creative Arts. He evaluated grant applications for the Flanders Science Foundation from 2019 to 2025. He became an advisor for the Tertiary Education Quality and Standards Agency in 2020 and a member of the University of Adelaide's Professorial Committee for the Fellowship Program from 2021 to 2022. In 2025, Baltussen was appointed emeritus professor of Classics and Ancient Thought at Adelaide University.

== Honours ==
In 2009, Baltussen was made a Fellow of the Australian Academy of the Humanities (FAHA) in the Philosophy and History of Ideas and Classical Studies branches of the academy.

== Selected publications ==
As of 2025, Baltussen has authored 10 books and numerous papers on the philosophy of Greece and Rome.

=== Books ===
==== Authored ====
- Baltussen, Han (2000). Theophrastus against the Presocratics and Plato: Peripatetic Dialectic in the De sensibus. Brill.
- Baltussen, Han (2008). Philosophy and Exegesis in Simplicius: The Methodology of a Commentator. Duckworth. ISBN 9780715635001.
- Baltussen, Han (2016). The Peripatetics: Aristotle's Heirs, 322 BCE–200 CE. Routledge.

==== Edited ====
- Adamson, Peter; Baltussen, Han; Stone, M. W. F., eds. (2004). Philosophy, Science and Exegesis in Greek, Latin and Arabic Commentaries. 2 volumes. Institute of Classical Studies.
- Baltussen, Han, ed. (2013). Greek and Roman Consolations: Eight Studies of a Tradition and Its Afterlife. Classical Press of Wales.
- Baltussen, Han; Davis, Peter J., eds. (2015). The Art of Veiled Speech: Self-Censorship from Aristophanes to Hobbes. University of Pennsylvania Press.
- Clarke, Jacqueline R.; King, Daniel; Baltussen, Han, eds. (2023). Pain Narratives in Greco-Roman Writings: Studies in the Representation of Physical and Mental Suffering. Brill.
- Johnson, Marguerite; Baltussen, Han, eds. (2025). A Cultural History of Love in Antiquity. Bloomsbury Academic.

=== Journal articles ===
- Baltussen, Han (2009). "Personal Grief and Public Mourning in Plutarch's Consolation to His Wife". American Journal of Philology. 130 (1): 67–98.
- Baltussen, Han (2007). "From Polemic to Exegesis: The Ancient Philosophical Commentary". Poetics Today. 28 (2): 247–281.
- Baltussen, Han (2009). "A Grief Observed: Cicero on Remembering Tullia". Mortality. 14 (4): 355–369.
- Baltussen, Han (2000). "Plato in the Placita (Aëtius Bk. IV): A Dielsian Blind Spot". Philologus. 144 (2): 227–238.

=== Edition and translation ===
- Eunapius (2023). "Lives of Philosophers and Sophists". In Baltussen, Han (ed.). Philostratus: Lives of the Sophists. Eunapius: Lives of Philosophers and Sophists. Loeb Classical Library. Translated by Baltussen, Han. Philostratus text edited and translated by Graeme Miles. Harvard University Press.
