= Antichthon =

- Discipline: Classics
- Language: English
- Edited by: Han Baltussen, Arthur Pomeroy

Publication details
- History: 1967–present
- Publisher: Australasian Society for Classical Studies, fmr. Australian Society for Classical Studies (Australia)
- Frequency: Annual

Standard abbreviations
- ISO 4: Antichthon

Indexing
- ISSN: 0066-4774
- OCLC no.: 1481592

Links
- Journal homepage

Antichthon is the peer-reviewed academic journal of the Australasian Society for Classical Studies, formerly the Australian Society for Classical Studies. The focus of the journal is ancient Greece and Rome, however, its scope is broadly defined so as to embrace the ancient Near East and the Mediterranean from the beginnings of civilisation to the Early Middle Ages.
