= Pieter Willem van der Horst =

Dutch biblical scholar

Pieter Willem van der Horst (born 4 July 1946) is a scholar and university professor emeritus specializing in New Testament studies, Early Christian literature, and the Jewish and Hellenistic context of Early Christianity.

== Education and career ==
Van der Horst was born in Driebergen, Netherlands. He studied classical philology and received a doctorate in theology in 1978. From 1969 to 2006, he was a research assistant, junior and senior lecturer, and full professor at the Faculty of Theology of Utrecht University. He is an editor of the series Commentaries on Early Jewish Literature, published by Walter de Gruyter. He became a member of the Royal Netherlands Academy of Arts and Sciences in 1994.

== "Jewish cannibalism" controversy ==
In 2006, van der Horst became embroiled in a controversy over his retirement lecture, "The Myth of Jewish Cannibalism," which traced the development of this antisemitic theme from the Hellenistic period through the Middle Ages to Nazism. He planned to conclude by examining the resurgence of the cannibalism myth in contemporary Islamic media, including cartoons, television programs, and sermons, particularly in Iran, Syria, and Palestine. The text of the lecture was reviewed in advance by Utrecht University administrators. According to van der Horst, he was asked by the dean of faculty to delete the passage on what he prefers to call "Islamic Jew hatred." She found the contemporary portions of the lecture to be "pamphlet-like" and "unscientific." When he declined to edit, the dean referred the matter to the rector magnificus Willem Hendrik Gispen, the university's chief administrator. Van der Horst was then asked to appear before a committee composed of the rector, two deans of faculty, and Bas de Gaay Fortman, who holds Utrecht's unique chair of Political Economy of Human Rights. The administration, while not disputing van der Horst's reconstruction of the chain of events, has maintained that he misunderstood the content of that meeting. Van der Horst says that he was given three reasons for editing his lecture:

They claimed it was too dangerous to give the complete lecture because it might trigger violent reactions from 'well-organized Muslim student groups' for which the rector could not take any responsibility. The committee also said it feared my speech would thwart efforts at bridge-building between Muslims and non-Muslims at the university. Finally, they claimed my lecture was far below the university's scholarly standards.

Van der Horst said that he was given 24 hours to edit the lecture, and left the meeting "in a state of total confusion." In a guest column for The Wall Street Journal, he wrote that he had decided, with no independent means to verify any potential risk to himself or others, to proceed with an expurgated version. Because of the challenge to his academic reputation, he said, he also asked several colleagues, including three professors of Islamic Studies he left unnamed, to review his work from a scholarly perspective. According to van der Horst, none found weakness in the scholarship, nor any statements offensive to Islam, Muhammad, or the Qur'an.

Van der Horst delivered his "castrated" valedictory speech 16 June 2006.

=== Media reaction ===
The next day, the incident began to receive Dutch media coverage. The deleted passages were published by the daily newspaper Trouw, which had been contacted by van der Horst's fellow professors. These included passages that van der Horst himself identified as "polemic" involving the connection between German fascism and "Islamic vilification of Jews" in the contemporary Middle East, with statements such as "the Islamisation of European antisemitism is one of the most frightening developments of the past decades."

On 22 June rector magnificus Gispen responded to the controversy in an interview with NRC Handelsblad, another Dutch daily. Gispen maintained that neither "Islamophobia" nor censorship was at issue, but rather the quality of van der Horst's work. He attributed van der Horst's response to resentment over having to retire and the "marginalization" of his academic department.

Van der Horst's Wall Street Journal column was published on 30 June. In it, he asserted that despite the publication of the unexpurgated version of his lecture in multiple media outlets, he "did not receive a single negative, let alone threatening, Muslim reaction," though some had criticized him for overgeneralization.

The incident has been compared to Utrecht University's handling of accusations against Peter Debye, the Nobel laureate after whom the university's Institute of Physics & Chemistry had been named. Debye's name was removed following allegations that he had collaborated with the Nazis while director of the Kaiser Wilhelm Institute in Berlin during the 1930s. Gispen himself acknowledged that his position toward van der Horst's lecture had been influenced by the Debye controversy.

Dutch media covered the controversy through news stories and in editorials; the positions of both the rector and van der Horst received support. French media are alleged to have underreported the incident, but French commentator Paul Landau stated strongly that in his opinion it "illustrated the level of 'dhimmitude' elite universities in many European countries have come to today. … Wake up, Erasmus, they've become fools."

Van der Horst went on to publish "The Myth of Jewish Cannibalism: A Chapter in the History of Antisemitism" in Proceedings of the Israel Academy of Sciences and Humanities (English Series), vol. 8 (2008). He traces the origin of the belief — that Jews murder a non-Jew each year to ritually consume the entrails and blood — to Apion, a 1st-century Alexandrian scholar who constructed the myth as a conflict between the civilizing Egyptian deity Isis and the god of the Jews.

== Selected works ==
In addition to numerous articles, van der Horst has published, edited or contributed to the following books:

- An Alexandrian Platonist against Dualism: Alexander of Lycopolis' Treatise 'Critique of the Doctrines of Manichaeus'. Translation with introduction and notes with J. Mansfeld. Brill 1974. Limited preview online.
- The Sentences of Pseudo-Phocylides. Introduction and commentary. Brill, 1978. Limited preview online.
- Miscellanea Biblica: Seven Months' Children in Jewish and Christian Tradition. Ephemerides Theologicae Lovanienses, 1978.
- Chaeremon, Egyptian Priest and Stoic Philosopher: The Fragments Collected and Translated. Brill, 1984. Limited preview online.
- Aelius Aristides and the New Testament. Brill Archive, 1980. Limited preview online.
- The Jews of Ancient Crete. Oxford Centre for Postgraduate Hebrew Studies, 1988.
- Jews and Christians in Aphrodisias in the Light of Their Relations in Other Cities of Asia Minor. Theologische Faculteiten der Rijksuniversiteiten, 1989.
- Studies on the Testament of Job. With Michael A. Knibb. Cambridge University Press, 1990.
- Studies on the Hellenistic Background of the New Testament. With Gerard Mussies. Faculteit der Godgeleerdheid, Rijksuniversiteit te Utrecht, 1990.
- Essays on the Jewish World of Early Christianity. Universitätsverlag Vandenhoeck & Ruprecht, 1990.
- Ancient Jewish Epitaphs: An Introductory Survey of a Millennium of Jewish Funerary Epigraphy (300 BCE-700 CE). Peeters Publishers, 1991. Limited preview online.
- "Jewish Poetical Tomb Inscriptions." In Studies in Early Jewish Epigraphy. Editor with J. W. van Henten. Brill, 1994. Limited preview online.
- The Birkat Ha-minim in Recent Research. T. & T. Clark, 1994.
- Aspects of Religious Contact and Conflict in the Ancient World. Faculteit der Godgeleerdheid Universiteit Utrecht, 1995.
- Polyhistor: Studies in the History and Historiography of Ancient Philosophy: Presented to Jaap Mansfeld on His Sixtieth Birthday. Editor with Keimpe A. Algra and David T. Runia. Brill, 1996. Essays from twenty-two contributors. Limited preview online.
- Hellenism Judaism Christianity: Essays on Their Interaction. Peeters Press, 1998. Limited preview online.
- Dictionary of Deities and Demons in the Bible (DDD). Editor with Karel van der Toorn and Bob Becking. William B. Eerdmans Publishing, 1999, 2nd edition. Limited preview online.
- Prayers from the Ancient World: Greco-Roman, Jewish, and Christian Prayers. With Gregory E. Sterling. University of Notre Dame Press, 2000. Sixty Greco-Roman, Jewish, and early Christian prayers spanning 700 BC to AD 500.
- Japheth in the Tents of Shem: Studies on Jewish Hellenism in Antiquity. Peeters Publishers, 2002. Limited preview online.
- "Anti-Samaritan Propaganda in Early Judaism." In Persuasion and Dissuasion in Early Christianity, Ancient Judaism, and Hellenism. Editor with Maarten J. J. Menken, Joop F. M. Smit, Geert Van Oyen. Peeters Publishers, 2003. Limited preview online.
- Philo's Flaccus: The First Pogrom. Introduction, translation, and commentary. Brill, 2003. Limited preview online.
- Jews and Christians in Their Graeco-Roman Context. Mohr Siebeck, 2006. Limited preview online.
- “Jewish Cannibalism: The History of an Antisemitic Myth”. Telos 144 (Fall 2008). New York: Telos Press.
- Early Jewish Prayers in Greek: A Commentary. With Judith H Newman. Walter De Gruyter, 2008. Text, translation, and commentary for twelve Jewish prayers composed by Greek-speaking communities.

Van der Horst was honored with the publication of Empsychoi Logoi: Religious Innovations in Antiquity. Studies in Honour of Pieter Willem van der Horst (Leiden: Brill, 2008), as part of the series Ancient Judaism and Early Christianity. The volume was edited by Alberdina Houtman, Albert de Jong, and Magda Misset-van de Weg.
