= Alexander of Lycopolis =

Egyptian writer

Alexander of Lycopolis (often also Lycopolis; Ancient Greek Ἀλέξανδρος Λυκοπολίτης, Aléxandros Lykopolítēs; Latin Alexander Lycopolitanus or Lycopolita) was an ancient Greek philosopher, who lived in Egypt during the late 3rd century CE, belonged to the Neoplatonic school and is remembered as a determined opponent of Manichaeism. This then still very young religion had been founded in the Persian Sasanian Empire by Mani, a contemporary of Alexander, had spread westward into the Roman Empire, and had been brought to Egypt by missionaries. Alexander’s polemic against Manichaeism provides valuable information about its early history and shows that he was well informed about the doctrine he opposed. His aim was to defend the Platonic worldview against novel religious teachings which he regarded as confused and irrational.

He was the writer of a short treatise, in twenty-six chapters, against the Manicheans (J. P. Migne, Patrologia Graeca, XVIII, 409–448). He says in the second chapter of this work that he derived his knowledge of Manis' teaching apo ton gnorimon (from the man's friend).

The work is a specimen of Greek analytical procedure, "a calm but vigorous protest of the trained scientific intellect against the vague dogmatism of the Oriental theosophies".

Photius says (Contra Manichaeos, i, 11) that he was Bishop of Lycopolis (in the Egyptian Thebaid). This view lived on well into the 19th century, although Louis-Sébastien Le Nain de Tillemont had concluded in 1697 that the author was a pagan and a Platonist. Otto Bardenhewer also opined this in (Patrologie, 234).

== Life and work ==
Alexander's place of origin was Lykonpolis (“City of Wolves”), in present-day Asyut in Egypt. Alexander likely received his philosophical education in Alexandria, after which he presumably returned to his hometown, where he worked as a philosophy teacher. He was of the Neoplatonist school of thought, though his philosophy was also influenced by Middle Platonism.

When well known Manichaean missionaries Papos and Thomas pretended to be students, appeared in his circle and succeeded in converting some of their peers, he considered it necessary to oppose them and refute their doctrines. For this purpose he composed his sole surviving work, Against the Teachings of Mani (Pros tas Manichaíou dóxas), the earliest known polemical work against Manichaeism, and the only testimony to Alexander's existence. This text was to become an important source for the study of early Manichaean thought, as Alexander apparently drew on reliable information originating from an authentic Manichaean account of the religion.

Despite the continued circulation of early attributions to an Alexander, Bishop of Lyconpolis, who allegedly converted to Manichaeism from paganism, modern research has concluded that Alexander was neither Manichaean nor Christian, but was a pagan philosopher.

Since he refers to the death of the religion’s founder Mani (c. 277 CE) but appears unaware of the persecution of Manichaeans in the Roman Empire under Emperor Diocletian, which began in 297 CE, the composition of his work is generally dated to the period between 277 and 297 CE.

Some parts of the transmitted text of the treatise appear to have been revised by a Christian.

== Alexander’s Presentation and Critique of Manichaeism ==
=== Historical and Religious Background ===
The treatise Against the Teachings of Mani consists of three sections: an introduction on Christianity and its decadence, a presentation of Manicheism and a philosophical refutation of Manichaeism. The work serves both as a source on the doctrines of early Manichaeism, confirmed in part by Manichaean texts discovered later, and as an important text on the history of early Neoplatonism. In its time, the text sought to demonstrate the incompatibility of Manichaeism with the main points and major currents of Greek philosophy. He viewed with concern that Mani’s ideas were gaining acceptance even among philosophers, and he attempted to stem this development.

Alexander regarded Manichaeism as a very distorted form of Christianity. In doing so, he took the Manichaean self-understanding as his point of departure: Mani had presented himself as a continuer and fulfiller of Christ’s mission, calling himself an apostle of Christ. Accordingly, Alexander opened his treatise with observations on "the philosophy of the Christians", which he characterized as "simple", and considered it a trivial but useful doctrine suited to plain minds. As Alexander described the activity of Jesus, he did not regard him as a savior but as a commendable teacher of virtue for farmers and craftsmen. In his view, the emphasis of Christianity and Manichaeism on morality and religious concerns coincided with their neglect of philosophical rigor, which Alexander saw as one of their weaknesses. According to Alexander, what began as a simple philosophy eventually had degenerated into a hopelessly convoluted and useless dogmatic system, and had split into multiple factions and sects who could not provide precise philosophical theory for their teachings and therefore nullified them; the leader of one of these sects was Mani. In Alexander’s assessment, Christianity was already in a process of dissolution, which he compared to the decline of sophistic disputation.

=== Against Manichaeism ===
==== Representation of the Manichaean myth ====
In his writings, Alexander provides an concise outline of the Manichaean cosmogony and soteriology, consisting of a myth of battle between the principles of god (including and allied with everything good) and matter (including and allied with everything evil). According to the myth, matter wished to conquer the realm of god, who being devoid of all evil could not punish it for trying to do so. As such the soul was sent to unite with matter, so that it would separate from it in the future and cause it to die. The soul was ultimately influenced by matter and imprisoned by it. Out of mercy, God sent a second power, the Demiurge, which created the universe, and the untainted portion of soul became the sun and the moon, while that which had been soiled by matter became the stars and the rest of heaven. The sun and the moon were sent beyond the universe, and everything else, including living things with divine power randomly moving inside them, continually come into being, and die when the divine power leaves them and ascends through a third power from the moon to the sun and finally to God. The role of Jesus within the doctrine is as an "intellect" who liberated a large portion of the soul and whose crucifixion (being nailed to the cross) exemplified the intermingling between matter and the divine power. The belief in this myth dictated vegetarianism and abstinence from procreation, as the birth of children would only continue the human race and delay the liberation of the imprisoned divine power, suicide however was still prohibited.

Alexander points out that Matter in the Manichaean doctrine is not how Plato defines it, as "that which becomes all things when it assumes quality and shape," nor how Aristotle defines it, as "the element in relation to which form and privation occur," rather it is defined by Manichaeans as the random motion in each individual thing.

==== Refutation of Manichaeism ====
For Alexander, the most extreme example of misguided sectarianism arising from Christian tradition was Manichaeism. After briefly discussing the life of Mani and Manichaean missionary activity, he summarizes its teachings and then proceeds to refute them. In presenting the doctrine, he notes that Manichaeism defined matter (hylē) as "disorderly motion" (átaktos kínēsis), which, he argues, differs fundamentally from Platonic and Aristotelian conceptions of matter.

Before undertaking his systematic critique, he described the dilemma he believed he faced. The doctrine he intended to address was irrational and relied not on arguments but on the authority of scriptures, making it difficult to refute. Instead of a demonstrable chain of reasoning, he found only assertions. A precise philosophical refutation would not reach those who had embraced Manichaeism uncritically; yet if he were to descend to the opponents’ level and employ manipulative techniques, he would fall into the very error he accused them of. To escape this dilemma, he adopted an extremely careful method.

His philosophical polemic is directed first against Manichaean dualism, the claim that two opposed, co-equal first principles exist: the good God and matter conceived as an inherently evil principle of darkness locked in conflict with him. Among other arguments, he maintains that if both are real creative first principles, each would require its own matter as a passive substrate, resulting in four principles, an implication Mani had failed to recognize. Moreover, if matter is "disorderly motion", as the Manichaeans assert, this presupposes the existence of something moved, namely, the elements. In that case, it becomes unclear whether the second principle is the mover or the thing moved. From his monistic standpoint, Alexander rejects the dualistic foundation of the Manichaean worldview: matter, too, derives from the divine and therefore should not be regarded as evil. More decisively than many other Neoplatonists, he denies any essential association between matter and evil. He argues that either it is in the nature of the highest principle to flow into matter or it is not. If it is, matter, being produced by the supremely good, cannot be evil; if it is not, the mixture of the two first principles could never have occurred.

He further contends that "disorderly" change is impossible in the realm of matter, for this characteristic belongs to none of the recognized types of change; all change proceeds according to law. He also argues that interaction between the two Manichaean principles would require a third mediating principle; otherwise, they would have no connection. If such a third principle existed, one would have to ask whether it is corporeal or incorporeal. In either case, it could not fulfill the mediating role and would thus be superfluous. The same question of corporeality or incorporeality applies to the two principles of Mani themselves. However one answers, whether both are incorporeal, both corporeal, or one corporeal and the other not, every option leads to an absurd consequence within the Manichaean system.

Alexander maintains that the Manichaean claim that God sent a power (dýnamis) down to matter to put an end to evil must also result in contradictions. From an empirical point of view, he notes, no effects of this supposed intervention are visible.

He ridicules the Manichaean notion that an evil power could confront God as an equal adversary, ascend into his realm, and launch an attack. For Alexander, there can be no philosophical reason for an evil principle to wage war against the good, nor could it ever possess the ability to do so. A realm of absolute evil would necessarily be weak, chaotic, and closed in upon itself; otherwise, it would contain partially good qualities. The absolutely evil would have neither motive nor capacity to approach the good. Any impulse toward the good is itself a sign of orientation toward what is right and is therefore good, meaning that such an impulse must originate from the good principle and thus cannot exist in an absolutely evil domain. Consequently, in a consistently dualistic system such as Manichaeism, no contact between the opposed principles would be possible and no conflict could arise between them.

He further argues that God cannot be at war with matter, for this would require attributing to him emotions incompatible with divine goodness. Manichaeans ascribed anger to God and the desire to punish hostile matter. Such passions, Alexander claims, are already inappropriate for a virtuous human being and therefore utterly inconceivable for God, the supreme good.

Against the Manichaean linear conception of world history, Alexander sets the cyclical worldview of Platonists and Aristotelians. Whereas the world inhabited by humans moves toward its end, the final victory of the good principle, in Manichaean thought, it is eternal for Platonists and Aristotelians. Alexander argues that the idea of a gradual historical improvement finds no support in experience; indeed, evil has not diminished since the world’s beginning, at least if one follows biblical history. Just as Cain slew Abel, so murder continued in the present, and wars had not decreased. Since no historical development toward the good is visible, evil cannot be interpreted as a temporary phase in a larger cosmological process, and the expectation that it will diminish and disappear is illusory. Moreover, Manichaeism is internally inconsistent: it posits both the possibility of moral progress and the existence of a disorderly motion of evil matter that produces wickedness. Such motion would either destroy progress or cease upon its completion, an outcome incompatible with the Manichaean notion of matter.

Alexander identifies numerous inconsistencies in Manichaean cosmology and cosmogony, which he analyzes in detail. He accuses the Manichaeans of advancing claims in this domain despite their lack of astronomical knowledge. Instead of making their theses plausible, they merely present their model without argument. He asserts that such people characteristically resort to citing mythological poetry when lacking evidence.

== Philosophy ==
Alexander's philosophy holds relevance for three different disciplines, the study of Early Christianity, Manichaeism and the History of Greek Philosophy. While his treatise is an early Greek source for the doctrines of Mani, his refutation of these doctrines from a philosophical standpoint is of equal importance. Alexander’s critical remarks on the simplicity of Christian philosophy, his indirect references to philosophical doctrines, and his assumption of a philosophically educated readership indicate that he was a professional philosopher. At the same time, however, he is seen not as an original philosopher, but as one of many representatives of Neoplatonism, who is remembered mainly because of his discussion of early Christianity.

Alexander the method of allegorical interpretation, and by translating the Manichaean myth into philosophical terms it becomes nonsensical, realizing Alexander's goal. However, the employment of this method obscures Alexander's actual philosophical position, as it allows the author to use ideas he does not necessarily agree with. Mansfeld points to an affinity between Alexander and the pagan Origen, colleague of Plotinus and student of Ammonius Saccas, in the rejection of a principle higher than the divine intellect (demiurge) and to Alexander's ties with Neoplatonic schools, such as the "School of Gaius", exemplified by his use of their doctrines in his arguments. Some of Alexander's positions are identical to those of Plotinus, and especially Porfyry, though the "hard core" of his philosophy cannot be reconciled with them. This, according to Mansfeld, may suggest a common ancestry for the shared ideas, with the most probable candidate being Amonius Saccas. As the period between Ammonius Saccas and the Alexandrian Platonists of approximately 400 CE is considered a "dark period" and "cloaked in obscurity", however, Alexander's treatise in seen as the "only non-missing link" between the pagan Origen, of the 3rd century CE, and Hierocles of the 5th, providing evidence for the continuity of the Alexandrian philosophical tradition.

Although Alexander does not provide a systematic philosophical exposition, a general outline may be constructed from scattered statements throughout the text.

From the text it is clear that Alexander is an eclectic Platonist of the Alexandrian variety, who revealed doctrines which may be attributed to Ammonius Saccas, the father of Neoplatonism, though this suggestion is speculative. He is described by van Oort as a "pre-Plotinian Neoplatonist".

Alexander speaks of a first principle, the cause for all beings and a divine intellect that stands as the source of all hypostatic reality, as all beings derive from it while it remains. This first principle is described as "beyond being", recalling 'the Good' of Plato and Plotinus. His pre-Plotinian Platonism is further demonstrated by his mention of an intellect demiurge.

As a Neoplatonist, Alexander rejected dualism, both Manichaean and Platonic, thus he attacked not only Mani, but also Plutarch, Atticus and Numinius, who taught of a primordial matter parallel to the first principle. Alexander supported the idea of a God who created matter of himself, similar to the idea of a demiurgic intellect who caused the hypostasis of all things, taught by the fifth-century Neoplatonist Hierocles of Alexandria. He also emphasized 'the will of God', as the procession of all things from his being, and not as a divine relationship with the world.

From his reaction to the Manichaean doctrine that the soul is mixed with matter, his view can be inferred that all individual souls derive from a world soul which cannot leave its body, contrary to the Manichaean view. As opposed to Mani, he also stressed that the soul’s entry into matter is positive and not negative, because it transforms the random motion of chaos into a cosmic harmony. The world, according to Alexander, is essentially good, as it is ruled by the soul, and the soul is derived both from the divine intellect and matter, which is in itself neutral.

Additional philosophical principles in Against the Teachings of Mani include Alexander's belief in intermediate beings such as nymphs and demons, which possess sense-perception, and that man's free will and choice are the sole source of evil.

In many ways, Alexander fused Platonic and Aristotelian ideas. His concept of the first principle as intellect combines the demiurge of Timeus with the Intelligence of Aristotle "intelligizing itself", and his concept of matter fuses the all-receiving mother, or nurse, of Plato with the structureless first substratum of Aristotle. He refers to Aristotle's theory of the "proper place of things", and distinguished between different kinds of motion, as Aristotle did.

== Reception ==
In the ninth century, Byzantine scholars—most notably Patriarch Photios I of Constantinople, engaged with Alexander’s work in connection with contemporary events. Emperor Basil I was then combating the Paulicians, a Christian movement sharply opposed to the hierarchy of the Orthodox Church. The Paulicians, whose theological positions were condemned as heretical, were considered spiritual heirs of Manichaeism. A large dossier of anti-Manichaean texts was therefore assembled for the emperor, and Alexander’s treatise was included. Owing to this circumstance, the treatise has survived. The entire manuscript tradition derives from a single Byzantine codex produced in the late ninth or early tenth century, now preserved in the Biblioteca Medicea Laurenziana in Florence.

Photios mistakenly claimed that Alexander was a Christian and bishop of Lycopolis, thereby granting theological authority to an ancient pagan Neoplatonist. This error persisted into the early modern period and even the nineteenth century; in volume 18 of Migne’s Patrologia Graeca (1857), Against the Teachings of Mani was still printed as the work of a Church Father. Although the church historian Louis-Sébastien Le Nain de Tillemont had recognized as early as 1696 that Alexander was a pagan author, this insight gained acceptance only gradually.

The first printed edition appeared in Paris in 1672, prepared by François Combefis, who also produced a Latin translation. The text, however, was marred by many omissions and corruptions. A reliable edition did not appear until 1895, produced by August Brinkmann, and it remains authoritative today.

Modern scholarship regards Alexander as an original thinker who developed his own system and subjected the revelation-based doctrines of his opponents to philosophical critique. He is also credited with maintaining a tone of intellectual seriousness rather than the vitriolic invective found in much Christian anti-Manichaean polemic. Nonetheless, scholars note that his portrayal of Manichaeism diverges in significant respects from the authentic teaching of Mani. This is particularly true of the doctrine of salvation, in which Alexander imputes to the Manichaeans a form of fatalism reminiscent of Stoic thought.

== Bibliography ==
=== Text editions ===
August Brinkmann (ed.): Alexandri Lycopolitani contra Manichaei opiniones disputatio. Teubner, Stuttgart 1989, ISBN 3-519-01024-0 (reprint of the 1895 edition; online)

J. B. Hawkins, Treatise of Alexander, Bishop of Lycopolis, On the Tenets of the Manichaeans, in : Ante-Nicene Christian Library vol. XIV : The Writings of Methodius, etc., Edinburgh 1869, 236-266. (Based on Galland's edition, and considered unreliable)

A. Galland, Bibliotheca Veterum Patrum IV, Venice 1786, 71-88. (Reuse of Combefis' text)

F. Combefis, Bibliothecae Graecorum Patrum auctarium novissimum II, Paris 1672, 3-21. (First edition, reprinted in J.P. Migne, Patrologia Graeca XVIII, Paris 1857, 411-448).

=== Translations ===
Pieter Willem van der Horst, Jaap Mansfeld: An Alexandrian Platonist against Dualism. Alexander of Lycopolis’ Treatise “Critique of the Doctrines of Manichaeus”. Brill, Leiden 1974, ISBN 90-04-04157-5 (English translation with introduction, based on the critical edition of Brinkmann)

André Villey: Alexandre de Lycopolis: Contre la doctrine de Mani. Les Éditions du Cerf, Paris 1985, ISBN 2-204-02238-1 (French translation with introduction and extensive commentary)

A. Adam, Texte zum Manichaismus, Berlin 21969, 54-56. (Only the synopsis of Mani’s doctrines)

R. Haardt, Die Gnosis, Wesen und Zeugnisse, Salzburg 1967, 252-254. (Only the synopsis of Mani’s doctrines)

=== Studies ===
Maria Vittoria Cerutti: Il mito manicheo tra universalismo e particolarismi regionali. La testimonianza di Alessandro di Licopoli. In: Annali di Scienze Religiose 7, 2002, pp. 225–258

Francesco Chiossone: Critica al concetto manicheo di materia in Alessandro di Licopoli. In: Giornale di metafisica 28, 2006, pp. 149–166

Johannes van Oort: Alexander von Lykopolis. In: Christoph Riedweg et al. (eds.): Philosophie der Kaiserzeit und der Spätantike (= Grundriss der Geschichte der Philosophie. Die Philosophie der Antike, vol. 5/2). Schwabe, Basel 2018, ISBN 978-3-7965-3699-1, pp. 1322–1327, 1425 f.

André Villey: Alexandros de Lycopolis. In: Richard Goulet (ed.): Dictionnaire des philosophes antiques, vol. 1, CNRS, Paris 1989, ISBN 2-222-04042-6, pp. 142–144

Friedrich Wilhelm Bautz: Alexander von Lykopolis. In: Biographisch-Bibliographisches Kirchenlexikon (BBKL), vol. 1, Bautz, Hamm 1975; 2nd unchanged edition, Hamm 1990, ISBN 3-88309-013-1, col. 110.

C. Riggi, Una testimonianza del “‘kerygma” cristiano in Alessandro di Licopoli, Salesianum 31 (1969), 561-628.

== Sources ==
- Christie, Albany James (1867). "Alexander Lycopolites". In William Smith (ed.). Dictionary of Greek and Roman Biography and Mythology. Vol. 1. Boston: Little, Brown and Company. p. 118.

Attribution
