= Gender of God in Judaism =

Although the gender of God in Judaism is referred to in the Tanakh with masculine imagery and grammatical forms, traditional Jewish philosophy does not attribute the concept of sex to God. At times, Jewish aggadic literature and Jewish mysticism do treat God as having a gender.

== Biblical perspectives ==
The first words of the Tanakh are B'reshit bara Elohim—"In the beginning God created." The verb bara (he created) suggests a masculine subject. Elohim is also masculine in form. The most common phrases in the Tanakh are vayomer Elohim and vayomer YHWH—"and God said" (hundreds of occurrences).

Genesis 1:26–27 says that the elohim were male and female, and humans were made in their image.

Again, the verb vayomer (he said) is masculine; it is never vatomer, the feminine of the same verb form. The personal name of God, YHWH, is presented in Exodus 3 as if the Y (Hebrew yod) is the masculine subjective prefix to the verb to be.

In Psalms 89:26 God is referred to as Father. "He shall cry unto me, Thou art my Father, My God, and the rock of my salvation."

In Isaiah 62:5, God is compared to the bridegroom, and his people to the bride.

- "For as a young man marrieth a virgin, so shall thy sons marry thee: and as the bridegroom rejoiceth over the bride, so shall thy God rejoice over thee."

In Isaiah 63:16, God is directly addressed and called "our Father".

- "Thou, O Jehovah, art our Father; our Redeemer from everlasting is thy name." (ASV)

To God, according to Judaism, is attributed the fatherly role of protector. He is called the Father of the poor, of the orphan and the widow, their guarantor of justice. He is also called the Father of the king, as the teacher and helper over the judge of Israel.

Some literary approaches to the Tanakh have argued that parallels between Biblical stories and earlier Sumerian, Akkadian and Canaanite creation myths show a matriarchal substratum that has been overlaid by a patriarchal approach. "In the Bible, the earth is the feminine complement of God: the two combined to form man, who articulates their relationship, for example, in sacrifice."

== Rabbinical views ==
Kabbalistic Judaism often relates to various "aspects" of God (cf. Sephirot). As Rabbi Aryeh Kaplan puts it, "[E]very name and every description that we may give to God can only apply to His relationship to His creation" Although God is not generally regarded as gendered in Judaism, Benjamin Blech writes that God has both masculine and feminine aspects.

In addition, God's "presence" (Shekhinah) is a grammatically feminine word, and is often employed as a feminine aspect of God.

Many traditional rabbinic commentators, however, such as Maimonides, view any such beliefs as verging on avodah zarah (idolatry). Secondary male sexual characteristics are attributed to God in some piyuttim (religious poems). These include a description of the beard of God in Shir Hakavod (The Hymn of Glory), and similar poetic imagery in the midrash Song of the Seas Rabbah.

Traditional meforshim (rabbinic commentators) hold that these descriptions, like all physical descriptions of God, are metaphorical or symbolic.

== Philo ==
Philo refers to God as Father in several passages:

"...discovering the nature of the one God, who is alone everlasting, and the father of everything else..." Philo – A Treatise Concerning the World (1)

"...by whose intervention they might obtain a reconciliation with the Father. First of all, the merciful, and gentle, and compassionate nature of him who is invoked, who would always rather have mercy than punishment. In the second place, the holiness of all the founders of the nation, because they, with souls emancipated from the body, exhibiting a genuine and sincere obedience to the Ruler of all things, are not accustomed to offer up ineffectual prayers on behalf of their sons and daughters, since the Father has given to them, as a reward, that they shall be heard in their prayers." Philo – On Rewards And Punishments (166)

== God as transcending gender ==
Many Jewish thinkers have rejected the notion that God can be anthropomorphized. Under this assumption, one cannot qualify God in terms of gender. Although egalitarian practices didn't emerge until much later, genderless concepts of God began to develop as early on as the mid-17th century. In his time, Baruch Spinoza was a highly controversial figure in the Jewish community of Amsterdam due to the perception of his views as heretical. Instead of the classic literal vision of God as depicted by Jewish Religious text, Spinoza envisioned God as a presence that encompassed the entire universe and beyond, a view commonly known as panentheism. In his Theological-Political Treatise Spinoza states, "Some imagine God in the likeness of man, consisting of mind and body, and subject to passions. But it is clear from what has already been proved how far they stray from the true knowledge of God. These I dismiss, for all who have given any consideration to the divine nature deny that God is Corporeal". Spinoza's seemingly heretical views for his time period opened the door for differing thoughts about the nature of God in relation to gender, even though Spinoza was excommunicated from his community for these views in 1656.

Other thinkers who also thought of God as transcending gender include:

- Hermann Cohen, who viewed God as the "ultimate archetype of morality."
- Martin Buber, who viewed God in an "I:Thou" relationship with human beings.
- Mordecai Kaplan, who viewed God as part of a natural process.
  - Similarly, Zalman Schachter-Shalomi viewed God in this same way, yet also viewed God as an experience.

== Jewish feminism ==
Feminist views in Judaism often retain the traditional view that God does not have any sex but does have a gender which is male, but experiment with the use of feminine language and symbolism for God.

== God/dess in Judaism ==
Some Jewish thinkers address issues of gendered language and imagery directly. Rabbi Jill Hammer challenges the features of traditional Jewish conceptions of God by creating a relatable deity, a Goddess, for those who cannot relate to "God". The Goddess is nondual, panentheist, and earthbound. Hammer describes the Goddess as both a person and in an impersonal form of nature. While she privileges the imagelessness that allows for a God beyond gender, she honors all framings and diverse experiences and visualizations of the Goddess. Julia Watts-Belser also discusses God/dess' gender. Like Hammer, Watts-Belser celebrates diversity of experiences and conceptions of God, stating that "She was none of that and all of it", demonstrating also panentheist notions. Watts-Belser visualizes a "trans God/dess ... characterized by fluidity, a shifting nature that refuses to resolve itself into a single manifestation or gender expression." This God/dess would allow the Jewish tradition to reclaim the female divinity it was denied rather than replace God with Goddess. In order to do so, she wants to utilize the Shekhinah, God's feminine side. She concludes that God is ultimately beyond gender since gender is a social construction and therefore insignificant. However, because gender does matter so much in our society, God's gender does and should matter to us.

== See also ==
- Androgynos (Judaism)
