= Balu'a Stele =

Moabite stele

Al-Balu' Stele
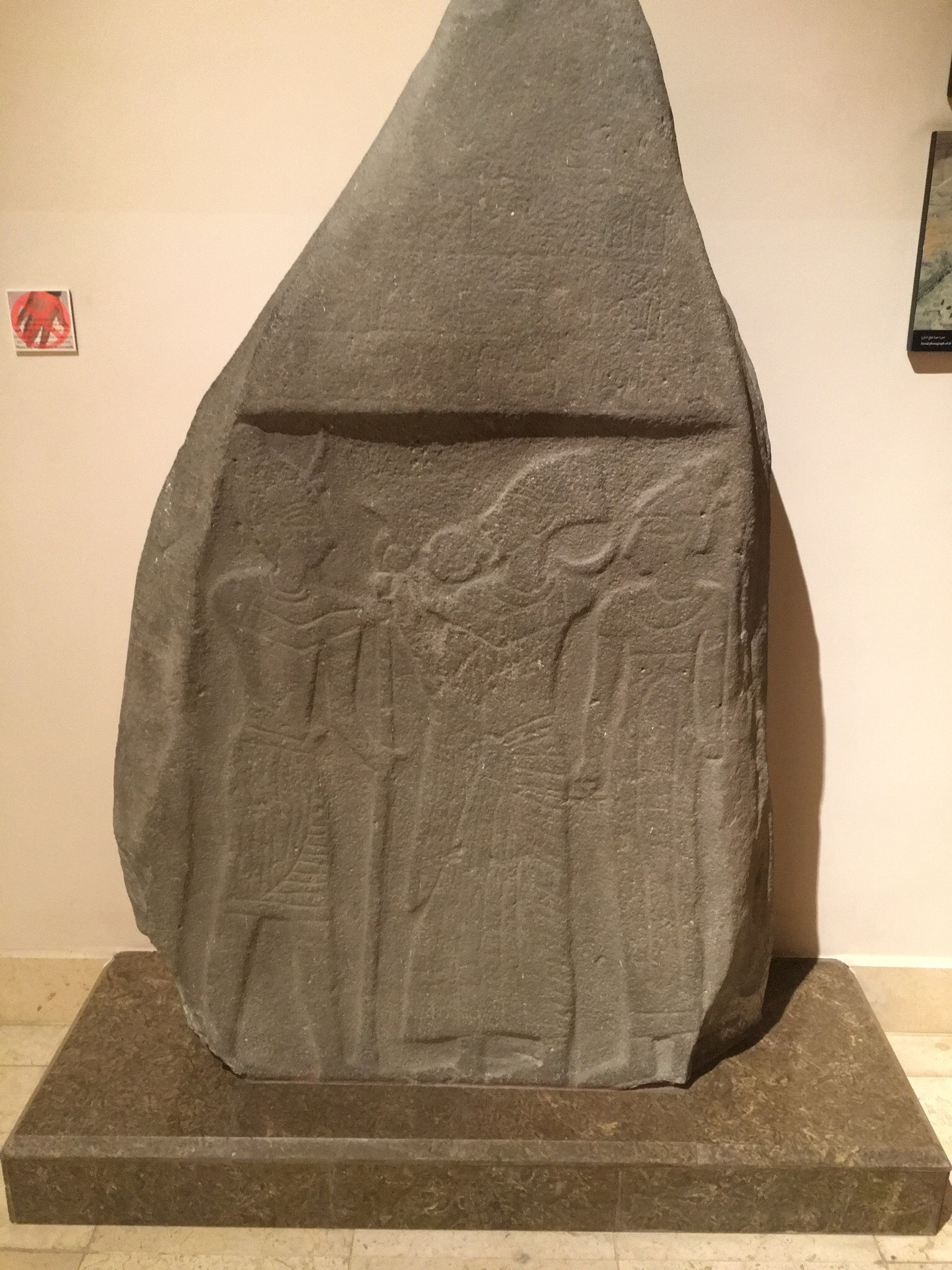
- Al-Balu' Stele on display at the Jordan Museum
- Material: Basalt
- Writing: Egyptian language
- Created: 1309–1151 BCE
- Discovered: 1930
- Present location: Jordan Museum

The Balu'a Stele is a basalt stele (inscribed stone) with a near completely unreadable Egyptian hieroglyphic inscription and relief panel. It was discovered in 1930 at the Khirbet al-Balu'a site north of the city of Karak and is thought to date to 1309–1151 BCE. The finding site is on the territory of the land of Moab, but the ethnical identity of the person who has carved it cannot be asserted. The iconography contains Canaanite elements, while the overall composition strictly conforms to Egyptian canons. It has been interpreted as representing two deities investing a Canaanite king, whom Egyptians would have seen as "Asiatic" and probably Shasu.
