= David T. Runia =

David Theunis Runia AM FAHA is a Dutch-Australian classical scholar and educational administrator who has worked in both Australia and the Netherlands.

== Early life ==
Runia was born in the Noordoostpolder, the Netherlands. At the age of four he emigrated to Australia when his father Klaas Runia took up a chair at the Reformed Theological College in Geelong. After attending Newtown State School and The Geelong College, he studied Classics at the University of Melbourne from 1969 to 1976 and was a resident of Queen's College from 1969 to 1971. In 1977 he returned to the Netherlands, where he obtained his doctorate at the Free University, Amsterdam in 1983.

== Academic career ==
In 1985 Runia was awarded a C&C Huygens Post-doctoral Fellowship by the Dutch National Research Body Z.W.O. (later N.W.O.), enabling him to be a member of the Institute for Advanced Study, Princeton in 1986–87 and a visiting fellow at the Humanities Research Centre at the Australian National University in Canberra in 1987. In 1991 he was appointed De Vogel Professor Extraordinarius at the Utrecht University, The Netherlands, a position that he held until 1999. In 1992, Runia was appointed to the Chair of Ancient and Medieval Philosophy at Leiden University. In 2002 he returned to Australia on his appointment as Master of Queen's College at the University of Melbourne, a position he held until retiring in 2016. He is currently a Professorial fellow in the School of Historical Studies in the Faculty of Arts at the University of Melbourne. In March 2017 he was appointed Director of the Institute for Religion and Critical Inquiry at the Australian Catholic University. He has also been a Professor Extraordinarius in the Department of Ancient Studies at the University of Stellenbosch, South Africa, since 2007.

Runia was elected a Fellow of the Australian Academy of the Humanities in 1999 and a Correspondent of the Royal Netherlands Academy of Arts and Sciences in 2004. He was appointed a Member of the Order of Australia in the 2025 Australia Day Honours.

Runia's scholarship research has focused on two main areas: (1) the interaction of Greek philosophy and Jewish-Christian thought, with particular attention paid to the contribution of the Hellenistic-Jewish author Philo of Alexandria and (2) the genre of ancient doxography, which gives us valuable information on the thought of early Greek philosophers.

== Publications ==
- Philo of Alexandria and the Timaeus of Plato, 1986 (dissertation).
- Philo of Alexandria: an Annotated Bibliography 1937–86, 1988 (with R. Radice)
- Exegesis and Scripture: Studies on Philo of Alexandria, 1990
- Philo in Early Christian Literature: a Survey, 1993
- Philo and the Church Fathers: a Collection of Papers, 1995
- Aëtiana: The Method and Intellectual Context of a Doxographer, Volume I: The Sources, 1997 (with Jaap Mansfeld)
- Philo of Alexandria: an Annotated Bibliography 1987–96, 2000
- Philo of Alexandria On the Creation of the Cosmos according to Moses: Translation and Commentary, 2001
- Proclus Commentary on Plato's Timaeus. Volume II Book 2: Proclus on the Causes of the Cosmos and its Creation, 2008 (with Michael Share)
- Aëtiana: The Method and Intellectual Context of a Doxographer, Volume II: The Compendium, 2009 (with J. Mansfeld)
- Aëtiana: The Method and Intellectual Context of a Doxographer, Volume III: Studies in the Doxographical Traditions of Ancient Philosophy, 2009 (with J. Mansfeld)
- Aëtiana IV: Papers of the Melbourne Colloquium on Ancient Doxography, 2018 (edited with J. Mansfeld)

Editor of −The Studia Philonica Annual , 10 volumes 1989–1998; with Gregory E. Sterling, 20 volumes 1999–2018 (excepting volume 28, which was a Festschrift in his honour, edited by Gregory E. Sterling (contains bibliography of his publications from 1977 to 2016)
