= Al-Qaryatayn, Palestine =

Biblical toponym in Palestine

Khirbet al-Qaryatayn (also spelled el-Qaryatein in the Hebron Hills) is a ruin located around 20 km south of Hebron in the West Bank of Palestine, southeast of as-Samu.

It is identified with קְרִיּוֹת (Hebrew: Qərîyyōṯ, "cities/towns") and the Biblical Kerioth in the Negev that was allotted to Judah (Joshua 15:25). Some Christian traditions interpret the epithet "Iscariot" in the name of Judas Iscariot as the "man of Kerioth"; this interpretation remains debated in scholarship.

In Arabic, the term khirbet is the conjunctive form of "ruin" (خرب, khirba, khirbeh, kharab).

== Toponymy and identification ==
The Arabic name al-Qaryatayn ("the two villages/townships") and Hebrew Qeriyyot ("towns/cities") reflect the same Semitic root (Q-R-Y), supporting the long-noted identification of Judah’s Kerioth-Hezron with Khirbet al-Qaryatayn/Tel Qeriyyot in the southern Hebron Hills.

== History of modern explorations ==
The ruin at Khirbet al-Qaryatayn/Tel Qeriyyot preserves multi-period remains including rock-cut installations, building foundations, cisterns, and tombs. Architectural remains dated to the Byzantine Palestine period have also been reported.

In 1838, Edward Robinson noted el-Kuryetein as a ruin located south of Hebron Hills. Kereiten appears on Van de Velde's map of Palestine, charted in 1851-1852, and published in 1858.

According to the 1870s Survey of Western Palestine, Khurbet el Kureitein comprised "traces of a large ruin and caves," and was "apparently a large town." The surveyors recorded ruins extending at least 180 metres in circumference, with houses, caves, cellars cut in the rock, and the remains of a Christian church. Numerous stone heaps and marked cisterns were also noted, along with the remains of a large square structure measuring 37 paces each side.

Local and regional gazetteers (e.g., Mustafa al-Dabbagh) describe ruins at the site including remains of walls, a broken column, caves and cisterns; the nearby "Khirbet Umm al-Qaryatayn" (also called Khirbet Maʿid) preserves additional foundations and enclosures.

== 1948 depopulation ==
Al-Qaryatain was depopulated and destroyed by Israeli forces as part of the widespread 1948 Palestinian expulsion and flight in the 1948 Palestine War. Survivors interviewed in later oral history projects report that Israeli tanks bulldozed the village’s houses and displaced its inhabitants, who subsequently sought refuge in nearby caves in Susya.

Subsequent decades saw limited re-use of the lands around the village as part of forestation and agricultural activities in the wider area. The Al-Qaryatain site itself remains a ruin (Arabic: khirbet), recorded in on-site photographs and satellite views documenting the remains and surroundings.

Former residents of al-Qaryatain and their descendants continue to maintain traditions of cave dwelling and agriculture, which are seen as an important part of the intangible cultural heritage of the southern Hebron Hills.

== See also ==
- As-Samu
- Hebron Hills
