= Keimpe Algra =

Dutch professor of Ancient and Medieval philosophy

Keimpe Arnoldus Algra (born 5 April 1959) is a Dutch professor of Ancient and Medieval philosophy at Utrecht University.

== Career ==
Algra was born on 5 April 1959 in Utrecht. He studied classical languages and literature at Utrecht University. In 1985 he became a university lecturer. Three years later he obtained his PhD with a dissertation on Concepts of space in classical and hellenistic greek philosophy. Between 2000 and 2003 he was Academy professor of the Royal Netherlands Academy of Arts and Sciences (KNAW) at Utrecht University. In 2001 he started as professor of Ancient and Medieval philosophy at the same university. In 2003 he gave the Alfred Edward Taylor lecture at the University of Edinburgh.

In 2004 Algra became member of the Royal Netherlands Academy of Arts and Sciences. He headed a KNAW committee which looked into the state of trust in Dutch science after a case in which Diederik Stapel had fabricated data, a report called Vertrouwen in wetenschap was published in May 2013.
