= Dictionary of Deities and Demons in the Bible =

Academic reference work on the Bible

- Genre: Religion
- Publication date: 1995

The Dictionary of Deities and Demons in the Bible (DDD) is an academic reference work edited by Karel van der Toorn, Bob Becking and Pieter W. van der Horst which contains academic articles on the named gods, angels, and demons in the books of the Hebrew Bible, Septuagint and Apocrypha, as well as the New Testament and patristic literature. Its first edition (Brill) appeared in 1995 and was chosen by Choice magazine of the American Library Association as Best Reference Work of 1996. The second extensively revised edition (Eerdmans, 960pp) appeared in 1999, under the auspices of the Faculty of Theology of Utrecht University. An electronic edition appeared in 2001. Advisors included Hans Dieter Betz, André Caquot (1923–2004), Jonas C. Greenfield (1926–1995), Erik Hornung Professor of Egyptology at Basel University, Michael E. Stone of the Hebrew University of Jerusalem, and Manfred Weipert of the University of Heidelberg.

== See also ==
- Theophory in the Bible
- Anchor Bible Dictionary
