= Klaas Runia =

Dutch theologian, churchman and journalist

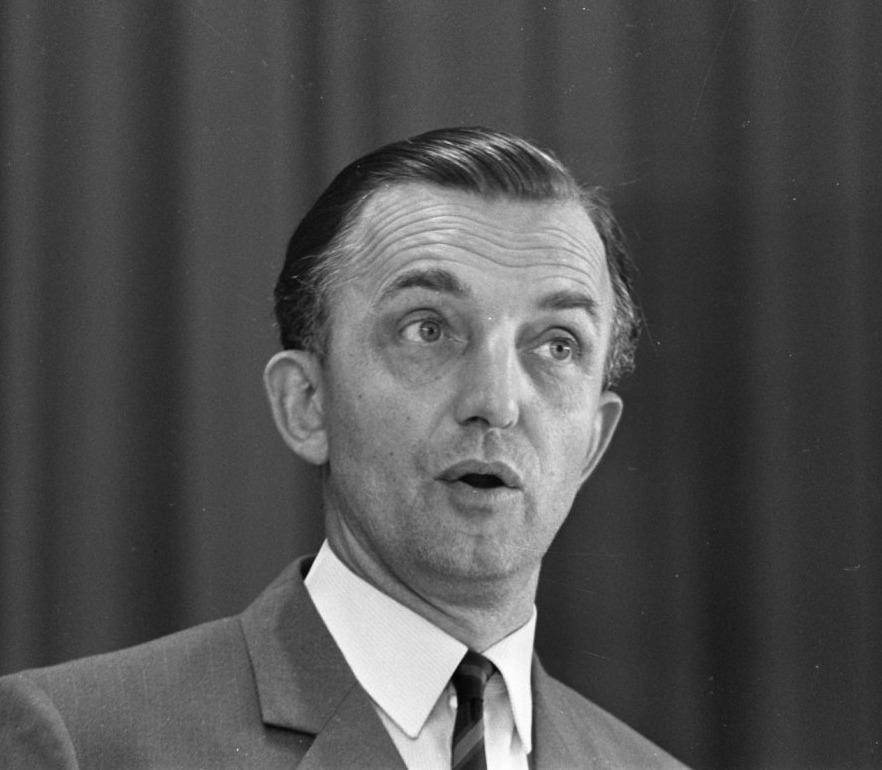
Klaas Runia in 1968

Klaas Runia (7 May 1926 in Oudeschoot – 14 October 2006 in Kampen) was a Dutch theologian, churchman and journalist. He studied at the Free University, Amsterdam and obtained his doctorate with a dissertation on the concept of theological time in Karl Barth in 1955. In 1956 he was appointed Professor of Systematic theology at the Reformed Theological College in Geelong, Australia, where he taught until his return to the Netherlands in 1971. During his time in Australia he exerted much influence on evangelical Christians, particularly at universities and theological schools. He was also elected chairman of the Reformed Ecumenical Council from 1968 to 1976. In 1971 he was appointed Professor of Practical Theology at the Kampen Theological University. During his professorship he was heavily engaged in church affairs and was regarded as a leader of the orthodox wing of the Dutch Reformed Church (Gereformeerde Kerken van Nederland), now the Protestant Church in the Netherlands. For many years he was also active as a journalist. He was editor-in-chief of Centraal Weekblad from 1972 to 1996. He also wrote many articles in the Frisian daily newspaper Friesch Dagblad. He retired in 1992, but remained active as a theologian and journalist until his death in 2006.

== Works ==
- De theologische tijd bij Karl Barth, 1955 (dissertation)
- Karl Barth's Doctrine of Holy Scripture, 1962
- I Believe in God..., 1963
- Reformation Today, 1968
- The Sermon under Attack, 1983 (1980 Moore College Lectures)
- The Present-day Christological Debate, 1984
- Wegen en doolwegen in de nieuwere theologie, 1993
- Bewerken en bewaren, 1982 (Festschrift)
- In de krachtenveld van de Geest, 1992 (Festschrift)

For a complete bibliography of all his writings see Bibliography of the Writings of Professor Klaas Runia 1926–2006, compiled, edited and introduced by David T Runia (2010).
