= Karel van der Toorn =

Dutch scholar of ancient religions (born 1956)

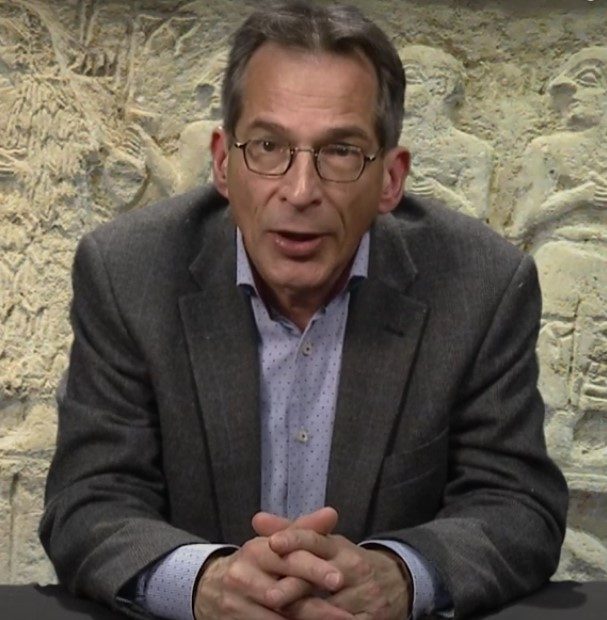
- Karel van der Toorn (2021)
- Born: 8 March 1956 (age 70); The Hague, Netherlands
- Awards: Commander of the French National Order of Merit

Academic work
- Discipline: ancient religions
- Institutions: University of Amsterdam; Utrecht University; Leiden University
- Notable works: Dictionary of Deities and Demons in the Bible

Karel van der Toorn (born 8 March 1956 in The Hague) is a Dutch scholar of ancient religions. From 2006 to 2011 he was chairman of the Board at the University of Amsterdam, where he was a professor from 1998 until he became the chairman.

Van der Toorn previously taught at Utrecht University and Leiden University. In 2012 he was made a Commander of the French National Order of Merit.

== Works ==
- Dictionary of Deities and Demons in the Bible; co-editor. 1995, 1999.
- Scribal Culture and the Making of the Hebrew Bible. Cambridge, Mass., 2007, Harvard University Press ISBN 978-0-674-03254-5
- Becoming Diaspora Jews: Behind the Story of Elephantine. New Haven, Conn., 2019, Yale University Press ISBN 978-0300243512.
