= Isaiah 20 =

Book of Isaiah, chapter 20

- ← chapter 19 chapter 21 →
- The Great Isaiah Scroll, the best preserved of the biblical scrolls found at Qumran from the second century BC, contains all the verses in this chapter.
- Book: Book of Isaiah
- Hebrew Bible part: Nevi'im
- Order in the Hebrew part: 5
- Category: Latter Prophets
- Christian Bible part: Old Testament
- Order in the Christian part: 23

Isaiah 20 is the twentieth chapter of the Book of Isaiah in the Hebrew Bible or the Old Testament of the Christian Bible. This book contains the prophecies attributed to the prophet Isaiah.

== Text ==
The original text was written in Hebrew language. This chapter is divided into 6 verses.

=== Textual witnesses ===
Some early manuscripts containing the text of this chapter in Hebrew are of the Masoretic Text tradition, which includes the Codex Cairensis (895), the Petersburg Codex of the Prophets (916), Aleppo Codex (10th century), Codex Leningradensis (1008).

There is also a translation into Koine Greek known as the Septuagint, made in the last few centuries BCE. Extant ancient manuscripts of the Septuagint version include Codex Vaticanus (B; $\mathfrak{G}$^{B}; 4th century), Codex Sinaiticus (S; BHK: $\mathfrak{G}$^{S}; 4th century), Codex Alexandrinus (A; $\mathfrak{G}$^{A}; 5th century) and Codex Marchalianus (Q; $\mathfrak{G}$^{Q}; 6th century).

== Parashot ==
The parashah sections listed here are based on the Aleppo Codex. Isaiah 20 is a part of the Prophecies about the Nations (Isaiah 13–23). {P}: open parashah; {S}: closed parashah.

{S} 20:1-2 {S} 20:3-6 {P}

== Verse 1 ==
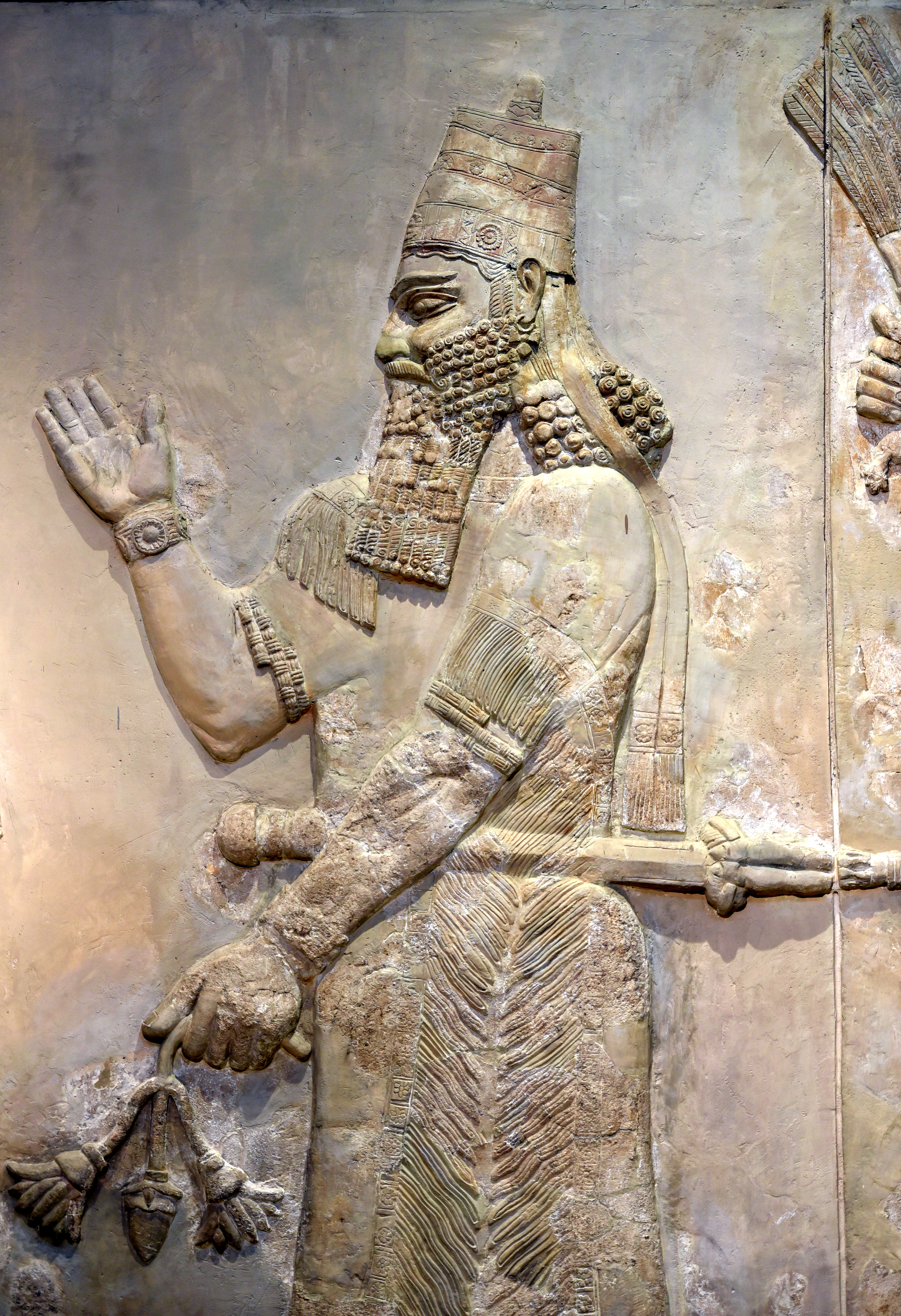
Sargon II, Iraq Museum

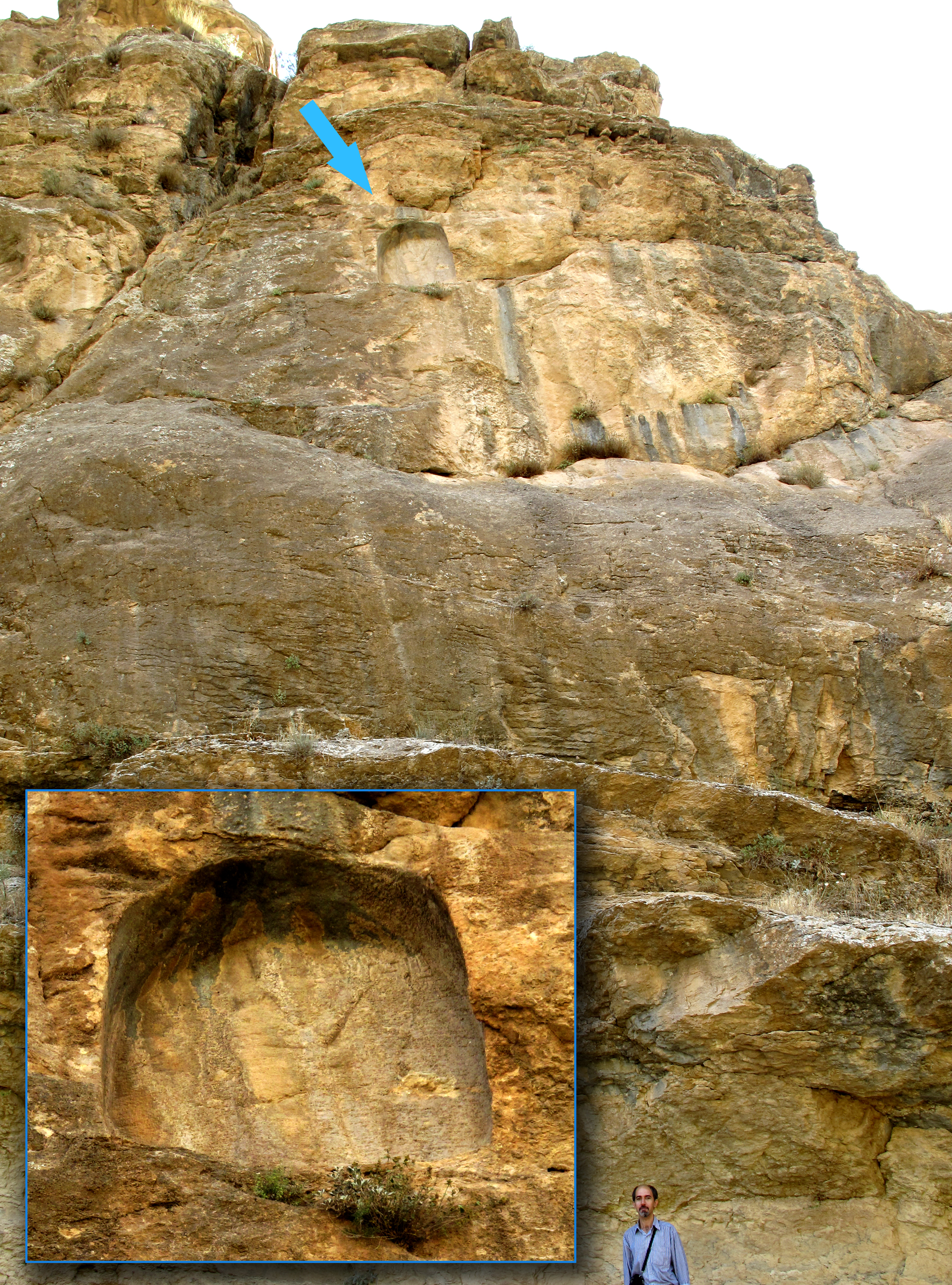
The Inscription of Sargon II at Tang-i Var pass near the village of Tang-i Var, Hawraman, Iran, mentioning the king's conquest of Ashdod.

In the year that Tartan came to Ashdod, when Sargon the king of Assyria sent him, and he fought against Ashdod and took it,

- "Sargon": refers to Sargon II, reigning 722–705 BC as the king of Assyria. His successful conquest of Ashdod in 712/711 BCE is recorded in the Nineveh Prism fragments containing Sargon's own inscriptions. He was succeeded by his son, Sennacherib. Although his name is only explicitly written in this verse in the whole Hebrew Bible, his impact is reflected in other passages such as 2 Kings 17:1–6, 24, 29–31 and in the first part of the book of Isaiah. The song of Isaiah 14:4b–21 could be secondarily applied to Sargon's death (in 705 BCE; his body was never recovered and lost in the battlefield), called in that passage as the "King of Babylon" because from 710 to 707 BCE Sargon ruled in Babylon and even reckoned his regnal year on this basis (as seen in Cyprus Stela, II. 21–22).

== Verse 2 ==
at the same time the Lord spoke by Isaiah the son of Amoz, saying,

"Go, and remove the sackcloth from your body, and take your sandals off your feet."

And he did so, walking naked and barefoot.

- "Sackcloth": refers to 'the rough garment of hair or coarse linen worn by mourners in lieu of the customary upper garment', which was also worn by prophets (2 Kings 1:8; Zechariah 13:4).

== See also ==
- Amoz
- Ashdod
- Assyria
- Egypt
- Ethiopia
- Isaiah
- Sargon
- Tartan
- Related Bible parts: 2 Kings 18, 2 Kings 19, 2 Kings 20, 2 Chronicles 29, 2 Chronicles 30, 2 Chronicles 31, Isaiah 22, Isaiah 30, Isaiah 37, Isaiah 38, Isaiah 39, Acts 8, 1 John 4

== Bibliography ==
- Würthwein, Ernst (1995). The Text of the Old Testament. Translated by Rhodes, Erroll F. Grand Rapids, MI: Wm. B. Eerdmans. ISBN 0-8028-0788-7.
