= Isaiah 18 =

Book of Isaiah, chapter 18

- ← chapter 17 chapter 19 →
- The Great Isaiah Scroll, the best preserved of the biblical scrolls found at Qumran from the second century BC, contains all the verses in this chapter.
- Book: Book of Isaiah
- Hebrew Bible part: Nevi'im
- Order in the Hebrew part: 5
- Category: Latter Prophets
- Christian Bible part: Old Testament
- Order in the Christian part: 23

Isaiah 18 is the eighteenth chapter of the Book of Isaiah in the Hebrew Bible or the Old Testament of the Christian Bible. This book contains the prophecies attributed to the prophet Isaiah, and is one of the Books of the Prophets.

== Text ==
The original text was written in Hebrew language. This chapter is divided into 7 verses.

=== Textual witnesses ===
Some early manuscripts containing the text of this chapter in Hebrew are of the Masoretic Text tradition, which includes the Codex Cairensis (895), the Petersburg Codex of the Prophets (916), Aleppo Codex (10th century), Codex Leningradensis (1008).

Fragments containing parts of this chapter were found among the Dead Sea Scrolls (3rd century BC or later):

- 1QIsa^{a}: complete
- 1QIsa^{b}: extant: verse 7
- 4QIsa^{b} (4Q56): extant: verses 8-14

There is also a translation into Koine Greek known as the Septuagint, made in the last few centuries BCE. Extant ancient manuscripts of the Septuagint version include Codex Vaticanus (B; $\mathfrak{G}$^{B}; 4th century), Codex Sinaiticus (S; BHK: $\mathfrak{G}$^{S}; 4th century), Codex Alexandrinus (A; $\mathfrak{G}$^{A}; 5th century) and Codex Marchalianus (Q; $\mathfrak{G}$^{Q}; 6th century).

== Parashot ==
The parashah sections listed here are based on the Aleppo Codex. Isaiah 18 is a part of the Prophecies about the Nations (Isaiah 13–23). {P}: open parashah; {S}: closed parashah.

{P} 18:1-3 {S} 18:4-6 {S} 18:7 {S}

== Verse 1 ==
Woe to the land shadowing with wings,

which is beyond the rivers of Ethiopia:

- "Shadowing with wings" (NKJV: "shadowed with buzzing wings"), translated from Hebrew: כנפים צלצל tsı̂letsal kenāpāı̂ym. The New Oxford Annotated Bible renders it "land of whirring wings" and interprets it as "Nubia/Ethiopia (Hebrew: "Cush") as an insect-infested land" (see Herodotus 2.95).

== Verse 2 ==
Isaiah addresses Ethiopian ambassadors who have visited Jerusalem.

== See also ==
- Ethiopia
- Mount Zion
- Related Bible parts: Acts 8

== Bibliography ==
- Würthwein, Ernst (1995). The Text of the Old Testament. Translated by Rhodes, Erroll F. Grand Rapids, MI: Wm. B. Eerdmans. ISBN 0-8028-0788-7.
