= Isaiah 22 =

Book of Isaiah, chapter 22

- ← chapter 21 chapter 23 →
- The Great Isaiah Scroll, the best preserved of the biblical scrolls found at Qumran from the second century BC, contains all the verses in this chapter.
- Book: Book of Isaiah
- Hebrew Bible part: Nevi'im
- Order in the Hebrew part: 5
- Category: Latter Prophets
- Christian Bible part: Old Testament
- Order in the Christian part: 23

Isaiah 22 is the twenty-second chapter of the Book of Isaiah in the Hebrew Bible or the Old Testament of the Christian Bible. This book contains the prophecies attributed to the prophet Isaiah, and is one of the Books of the Prophets. This chapter contains a prophecy against "untimely rejoicing in Jerusalem" and "a threefold prediction of Shebna's fall (Isaiah 22:25) and of Eliakim's elevation".

== Text ==
This text was originally written in Hebrew language. This chapter is divided into 25 verses.

=== Textual witnesses ===
Some early manuscripts containing the text of this chapter in Hebrew are the Masoretic Text tradition, which includes the Codex Cairensis (895), the Petersburg Codex of the Prophets (916), Aleppo Codex (10th century), Codex Leningradensis (1008).

Fragments containing parts of this chapter were found among the Dead Sea Scrolls (3rd century BC or later):

- 1QIsa^{a}: complete
- 1QIsa^{b}: extant: verses 9, 11‑18, 20, 24‑25
- 4QIsa^{a} (4Q55): extant: verses 13‑25
- 4QIsa^{b} (4Q56): extant: verses 24‑25
- 4QIsa^{c} (4Q57): extant: verses 10‑14
- 4QIsa^{f} (4Q60): extant: verses 15‑22, 25

There is also a translation into Koine Greek known as the Septuagint, made in the last few centuries BC. Extant ancient manuscripts of the Septuagint version include Codex Vaticanus (B; $\mathfrak{G}$^{B}; 4th century), Codex Sinaiticus (S; BHK: $\mathfrak{G}$^{S}; 4th century), Codex Alexandrinus (A; $\mathfrak{G}$^{A}; 5th century) and Codex Marchalianus (Q; $\mathfrak{G}$^{Q}; 6th century).

== Parashot ==
The parashah sections listed here are based on the Aleppo Codex. Isaiah 22 is a part of the Prophecies about the Nations (Isaiah 13–23). {P}: open parashah; {S}: closed parashah.

{S} 22:1-14 {P} 22:15-25 {P}

== Structure ==
John Skinner, in the Cambridge Bible for Schools and Colleges, refers to verses 1-14 as "the inexpiable sin of Jerusalem". Isaiah alleges that they have sinned "beyond the possibility of pardon".

== Proclamation against Jerusalem (verses 1–14) ==
=== Verse 1 ===
The burden against the Valley of Vision.

What ails you now, that you have all gone up to the housetops,

The "Valley of Vision" is also referred to as the Valley of Hinnom, from which the name Gehenna is derived. "Burden" (Hebrew: מַשָּׂ֖א mashā): "oracle, prophecy"; is a keyword in the superscriptions for a total of nine similar oracles, the others being Isaiah 13:1, 15:1, 17:1, 19:1, 21:1, 11, 13, and 23:1, similarly in Zechariah 12:1 and 14:1, and Malachi 1.

=== Verse 8 ===
He removed the protection of Judah.

You looked in that day to the armor of the House of the Forest;

- "The House of the Forest": or "The House of the Forest of Lebanon", was the name for one of the prestigious buildings established by King Solomon in Jerusalem, within his palace complex (1 Kings 7:2–5), which used a great amount of cedar wood from Lebanon for the "pillars, beams, and roofing material", thus looking like a "forest".

He built the house of the forest of Lebanon; its length was 100 cubits and its width 50 cubits and its height 30 cubits, on four rows of cedar pillars with cedar beams on the pillars.

Once it stored the royal armour in form of "300 shields of gold and vessels of gold" (1 Kings 10:17–21; 2 Chronicles 9:16).

== Judgments against Shebna (verses 15–25) ==
That steward there ...

This expression points contemptuously to the position of the minister of the court. The Jerusalem Bible distinguishes two separate oracles against Shebna: verses 15-18 and, later, verses 19–23.

=== Verse 22 ===
"The key of the house of David I will lay on his shoulder. Then he shall open, and no one shall shut. And he shall shut, and no one shall open."

This verse is cited in Revelation 3:7. "The key" may refer to a literal insignia worn by the chief administrator or symbolize the administrator's authority to grant or exclude access to the king. Eliakim is, "to a certain extent, a type of Christ; perhaps also of his faithful ministers".

=== Verse 25 ===
"'In that day,' says the Lord of hosts, 'the peg that is fastened in the secure place will be removed and be cut down and fall, and the burden that was on it will be cut off; for the Lord has spoken.'"

"The peg that is fastened in the secure place", or "the peg driven into a firm place", refers to Eliakim, who will also be removed from office in due course.

== See also ==
- Elam
- Eliakim son of Hilkiah
- Babylon
- Judah
- Kir
- Shebna
- Shebna inscription
- Related Bible parts: 1 Kings 7, 2 Kings 16, 2 Kings 18, 2 Kings 19, Isaiah 36, Isaiah 37, Revelation 3

== Sources ==
- Childs, Brevard S. (2001). Isaiah. Westminster John Knox Press. ISBN 9780664221430.
- Würthwein, Ernst (1995). The Text of the Old Testament. Translated by Rhodes, Erroll F. Grand Rapids, MI: Wm. B. Eerdmans. ISBN 0-8028-0788-7.
