= Isaiah 14 =

Book of Isaiah, chapter 14

- ← chapter 13 chapter 15 →
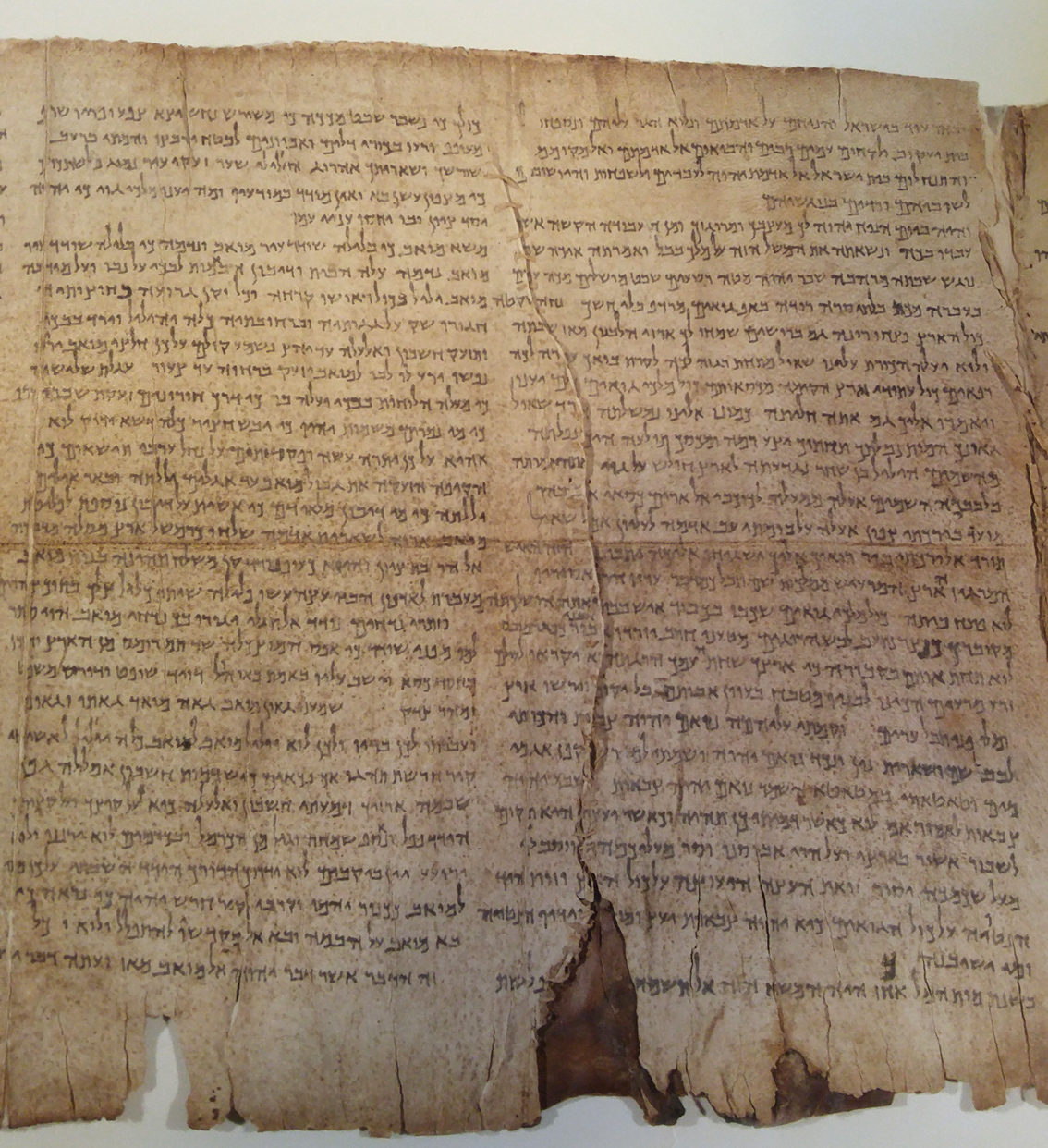
- Photo of Great Isaiah Scroll facsimile, showing columns 12-13 (Isaiah 14:1-16:14).
- Book: Book of Isaiah
- Hebrew Bible part: Nevi'im
- Order in the Hebrew part: 5
- Category: Latter Prophets
- Christian Bible part: Old Testament
- Order in the Christian part: 23

Isaiah 14 is the fourteenth chapter of the Book of Isaiah in the Hebrew Bible or the Old Testament of the Christian Bible. This book contains the prophecies attributed to the prophet Isaiah, and is one of the Books of the Prophets.

The taunt against the Babylonian king contained within the chapter, may be a stand in for any powerful tyrant and aggressor. The elements being drawn upon are recognized as having older Ugaritic patterns, that refer to the rise and fall of the morning star Venus who in Canaanite myth is personified as Athtar.

== Text ==
The original text was written in Hebrew language. In English and most other languages, this chapter is divided into 32 verses.

=== Textual witnesses ===
Some early manuscripts containing the text of this chapter in Hebrew are of the Masoretic Text tradition, which includes the Codex Cairensis (895), the Petersburg Codex of the Prophets (916), Aleppo Codex (10th century), Codex Leningradensis (1008).

Fragments containing parts of this chapter were found among the Dead Sea Scrolls (3rd century BCE or later):

- 1QIsa^{a}: complete
- 4QIsa^{c} (4Q57): extant verses 1-5, 13
- 4QIsa^{l} (4Q65): extant verses 1‑12, 21‑24
- 4QIsa^{o} (4Q68): extant verses 28‑32

There is also a translation into Koine Greek known as the Septuagint, made in the last few centuries BCE. Extant ancient manuscripts of the Septuagint version include Codex Vaticanus (B; $\mathfrak{G}$^{B}; 4th century), Codex Sinaiticus (S; BHK: $\mathfrak{G}$^{S}; 4th century), Codex Alexandrinus (A; $\mathfrak{G}$^{A}; 5th century) and Codex Marchalianus (Q; $\mathfrak{G}$^{Q}; 6th century).

== Parashot ==
The parashah sections listed here are based on the Aleppo Codex. Isaiah 14 is a part of the Prophecies about the Nations (Isaiah 13–23). {P}: open parashah; {S}: closed parashah.

[{S} 13:6-22] 14:1-2 {S} 14:3-27 {P} 14:28-32 {P}

== The restoration of Jacob (14:1–3) ==
=== Verse 1 ===
For the Lord will have mercy on Jacob, and will yet choose Israel, and set them in their own land: and the strangers shall be joined with them, and they shall cleave to the house of Jacob.

- "For": from the Hebrew word כִּי, ki, at the start of the verse as 'asseverative' ("certainly"), emphasizing the Lord's desire to restore his people as one of the reasons for Babylon's demise (Isaiah 13:22b).

=== Verse 2 ===
And the people shall take them, and bring them to their place: and the house of Israel shall possess them in the land of the LORD for servants and handmaids: and they shall take them captives, whose captives they were; and they shall rule over their oppressors.

=== Verse 3 ===
And it shall come to pass in the day that the LORD shall give thee rest from thy sorrow, and from thy fear, and from the hard bondage wherein thou wast made to serve,

== The Parable against the King of Babylon (14:4–21) ==
The mashal, or the parable against the king of Babylon is the oracle revealed to Isaiah the prophet. It is also considered a proverb. The parable is 18 verses long from verse 4 to verse 21.

=== Hebrew Text ===
The following table shows the Hebrew text of Isaiah 14:4-21 with vowels alongside an English translation based upon the JPS 1917 translation (now in the public domain).

Verse	Hebrew text	English translation (JPS 1917)
4	וְנָשָׂ֜אתָ הַמָּשָׁ֥ל הַזֶּ֛ה עַל־מֶ֥לֶךְ בָּבֶ֖ל וְאָמָ֑רְתָּ אֵ֚יךְ שָׁבַ֣ת נֹגֵ֔שׂ שָׁבְתָ֖ה מַדְהֵבָֽה׃	that thou shalt take up this parable against the king of Babylon, and say: How hath the oppressor ceased! The exactress of gold ceased!
5	שָׁבַ֥ר יְהֹוָ֖ה מַטֵּ֣ה רְשָׁעִ֑ים שֵׁ֖בֶט מֹֽשְׁלִֽים׃	The LORD hath broken the staff of the wicked, the sceptre of the rulers,
6	מַכֶּ֤ה עַמִּים֙ בְּעֶבְרָ֔ה מַכַּ֖ת בִּלְתִּ֣י סָרָ֑ה רֹדֶ֤ה בָאַף֙ גּוֹיִ֔ם מֻרְדָּ֖ף בְּלִ֥י חָשָֽׂךְ׃	That smote the peoples in wrath with an incessant stroke, that ruled the nations in anger, with a persecution that none restrained.
7	נָ֥חָה שָׁקְטָ֖ה כׇּל־הָאָ֑רֶץ פָּצְח֖וּ רִנָּֽה׃	The whole earth is at rest, and is quiet; they break forth into singing.
8	גַּם־בְּרוֹשִׁ֛ים שָׂמְח֥וּ לְךָ֖ אַרְזֵ֣י לְבָנ֑וֹן מֵאָ֣ז שָׁכַ֔בְתָּ לֹא־יַעֲלֶ֥ה הַכֹּרֵ֖ת עָלֵֽינוּ׃	Yea, the cypresses rejoice at thee, and the cedars of Lebanon: ‘Since thou art laid down, no feller is come up against us.’
9	שְׁא֗וֹל מִתַּ֛חַת רָגְזָ֥ה לְךָ֖ לִקְרַ֣את בּוֹאֶ֑ךָ עוֹרֵ֨ר לְךָ֤ רְפָאִים֙ כׇּל־עַתּ֣וּדֵי אָ֔רֶץ הֵקִים֙ מִכִּסְאוֹתָ֔ם כֹּ֖ל מַלְכֵ֥י גוֹיִֽם׃	The nether-world from beneath is moved for thee to meet thee at thy coming; the shades are stirred up for thee, even all the chief ones of the earth; all the kings of the nations are raised up from their thrones.
10	כֻּלָּ֣ם יַעֲנ֔וּ וְיֹאמְר֖וּ אֵלֶ֑יךָ גַּם־אַתָּ֛ה חֻלֵּ֥יתָ כָמ֖וֹנוּ אֵלֵ֥ינוּ נִמְשָֽׁלְתָּ׃	All they do answer And say unto thee: ‘Art thou also become weak as we? Art thou become like unto us?
11	הוּרַ֥ד שְׁא֛וֹל גְּאוֹנֶ֖ךָ הֶמְיַ֣ת נְבָלֶ֑יךָ תַּחְתֶּ֙יךָ֙ יֻצַּ֣ע רִמָּ֔ה וּמְכַסֶּ֖יךָ תּוֹלֵעָֽה׃	Thy pomp is brought down to the nether-world, And the noise of thy psalteries; the maggot is spread under thee, And the worms cover thee.’
12	אֵ֛יךְ נָפַ֥לְתָּ מִשָּׁמַ֖יִם הֵילֵ֣ל בֶּן־שָׁ֑חַר נִגְדַּ֣עְתָּ לָאָ֔רֶץ חוֹלֵ֖שׁ עַל־גּוֹיִֽם׃	How art thou fallen from heaven, O day-star, son of the morning! How art thou cut down to the ground, That didst cast lots over the nations!
13	וְאַתָּ֞ה אָמַ֤רְתָּ בִֽלְבָבְךָ֙ הַשָּׁמַ֣יִם אֶעֱלֶ֔ה מִמַּ֥עַל לְכוֹכְבֵי־אֵ֖ל אָרִ֣ים כִּסְאִ֑י וְאֵשֵׁ֥ב בְּהַר־מוֹעֵ֖ד בְּיַרְכְּתֵ֥י צָפֽוֹן׃	And thou saidst in thy heart: ‘I will ascend into heaven, Above the stars of God Will I exalt my throne, And I will sit upon the mount of meeting, In the uttermost parts of the north;
14	אֶֽעֱלֶ֖ה עַל־בָּ֣מֳתֵי עָ֑ב אֶדַּמֶּ֖ה לְעֶלְיֽוֹן׃	I will ascend above the heights of the clouds; I will be like the Most High.’
15	אַ֧ךְ אֶל־שְׁא֛וֹל תּוּרָ֖ד אֶל־יַרְכְּתֵי־בֽוֹר׃	Yet thou shalt be brought down to the nether-world, To the uttermost parts of the pit.
16	רֹאֶ֙יךָ֙ אֵלֶ֣יךָ יַשְׁגִּ֔יחוּ אֵלֶ֖יךָ יִתְבּוֹנָ֑נוּ הֲזֶ֤ה הָאִישׁ֙ מַרְגִּ֣יז הָאָ֔רֶץ מַרְעִ֖ישׁ מַמְלָכֽוֹת׃	They that saw thee do narrowly look upon thee, They gaze earnestly at thee: ‘Is this the man that made the earth to tremble, That did shake kingdoms;
17	שָׂ֥ם תֵּבֵ֛ל כַּמִּדְבָּ֖ר וְעָרָ֣יו הָרָ֑ס אֲסִירָ֖יו לֹא־פָ֥תַח בָּֽיְתָה׃	That made the world as a wilderness, And destroyed the cities thereof; That opened not the house of his prisoners?’
18	כׇּל־מַלְכֵ֥י גוֹיִ֖ם כֻּלָּ֑ם שָׁכְב֥וּ בְכָב֖וֹד אִ֥ישׁ בְּבֵיתֽוֹ׃	All the kings of the nations, all of them, sleep in glory, every one in his own house.
19	וְאַתָּ֞ה הׇשְׁלַ֤כְתָּ מִֽקִּבְרְךָ֙ כְּנֵ֣צֶר נִתְעָ֔ב לְבֻ֥שׁ הֲרֻגִ֖ים מְטֹ֣עֲנֵי חָ֑רֶב יוֹרְדֵ֥י אֶל־אַבְנֵי־ב֖וֹר כְּפֶ֥גֶר מוּבָֽס׃	But thou art cast forth away from thy grave Like an abhorred offshoot, In the raiment of the slain, that are thrust through with the sword, That go down to the pavement of the pit, As a carcass trodden under foot.
20	לֹֽא־תֵחַ֤ד אִתָּם֙ בִּקְבוּרָ֔ה כִּי־אַרְצְךָ֥ שִׁחַ֖תָּ עַמְּךָ֣ הָרָ֑גְתָּ לֹא־יִקָּרֵ֥א לְעוֹלָ֖ם זֶ֥רַע מְרֵעִֽים׃	Thou shalt not be joined with them in burial, because thou hast destroyed thy land, Thou hast slain thy people; the seed of evil-doers shall not be named for ever.
21	הָכִ֧ינוּ לְבָנָ֛יו מַטְבֵּ֖חַ בַּעֲוֺ֣ן אֲבוֹתָ֑ם בַּל־יָקֻ֙מוּ֙ וְיָ֣רְשׁוּ אָ֔רֶץ וּמָלְא֥וּ פְנֵי־תֵבֵ֖ל עָרִֽים׃	Prepare ye slaughter for his children For the iniquity of their fathers; That they rise not up, and possess the earth, And fill the face of the world with cities.

=== Trivia ===
The song in verses 4b–21 could be secondarily applied to Sargon II, who died in 705 BCE and whose body was never recovered from the battlefield and thus never buried. Here, Sargon ("King of Assyria" in Isaiah 20:1) is called the "King of Babylon" because from 710–707 BCE he ruled in Babylon and even reckoned his regnal year on this basis (as seen in Cyprus Stela, II. 21–22).

=== Verse 12 ===
"How you are fallen from heaven,

O Lucifer, son of the morning!

How you are cut down to the ground,

You who weakened the nations!"

- "Fallen from heaven": see Luke 10:15, 18 for the words of Jesus regarding the War in Heaven.
- "Lucifer" or "Daystar" (Hebrew: הילל, romanized: hēlēl, from Hebrew: הלל, romanized: hālal, "to shine"). The Septuagint renders it Ἑωσφόρος Heōsphoros, and Jerome in the Vulgate, "Lucifer, the morning star"; in the Chaldee, "How art thou fallen from high, who wert splendid among the sons of men." The New Oxford Annotated Bible suggests the correlation with "a Canaanite myth of the gods Helel and Shahar (Morning Star and Dawn), who fall from heaven as a result of rebellion."

=== Verse 19 ===
But you are cast out of your grave

Like an abominable branch,
Like the garment of those who are slain,

Thrust through with a sword,

Who go down to the stones of the pit,
Like a corpse trodden underfoot.

- "Abominable branch": "despised branch" or "like a shoot that is abhorred", where "branch" or "shoot" is from Hebrew word נֵצֶר, netser (cf. Isaiah 11:1), here may refer to 'a small shoot that is trimmed from a plant and tossed away'.
- "Thrust": "pierced"

== Destruction of Babylon, Assyria and Philistia (14:22–32) ==
=== Verse 29 ===
Do not rejoice, all you of Philistia,
Because the rod that struck you is broken;
For out of the serpent's roots will come forth a viper,
And its offspring will be a fiery flying serpent.

- "Philistia": from Hebrew: פְלֶ֙שֶׁת֙, p̄ə-le-šeṯ, KJV renders it as "Palestina", not in the wider meaning as today, but specifically as 'the country of the Philistines'.

== See also ==
- Assyria
- Babylon
- Jacob
- Lebanon
- Lucifer
- Philistia
- Rephaim
- Zion
- Related Bible parts: Isaiah 13, Isaiah 15, Luke 10, Revelation 22

== Bibliography ==
- Ulrich, Eugene, ed. (2010). The Biblical Qumran Scrolls: Transcriptions and Textual Variants. Brill.
- Würthwein, Ernst (1995). The Text of the Old Testament. Translated by Rhodes, Erroll F. Grand Rapids, MI: Wm. B. Eerdmans. ISBN 0-8028-0788-7.
