= Isaiah 17 =

Book of Isaiah, chapter 17

- ← chapter 16 chapter 18 →
- The Great Isaiah Scroll, the best preserved of the biblical scrolls found at Qumran from the second century BC, contains all the verses in this chapter.
- Book: Book of Isaiah
- Hebrew Bible part: Nevi'im
- Order in the Hebrew part: 5
- Category: Latter Prophets
- Christian Bible part: Old Testament
- Order in the Christian part: 23

Isaiah 17 is the seventeenth chapter of the Book of Isaiah in the Hebrew Bible or the Old Testament of the Christian Bible. This book contains the prophecies attributed to the prophet Isaiah, and is one of the Books of the Prophets. The New King James Version describes this chapter as a "proclamation against Syria and Israel".

== Text ==
The original text was written in Hebrew. This chapter is divided into 14 verses.

=== Textual witnesses ===
Some early manuscripts containing the text of this chapter in Hebrew are of the Masoretic Text tradition, which includes the Codex Cairensis (895), the Petersburg Codex of the Prophets (916), Aleppo Codex (10th century), Codex Leningradensis (1008).

Fragments containing parts of this chapter were found among the Dead Sea Scrolls (3rd century BC or later):

- 1QIsa^{a}: complete
- 4QIsa^{a} (4Q55): extant: verses 9-14
- 4QIsa^{b} (4Q56): extant: verses 8-14

There is also a translation into Koine Greek known as the Septuagint, made in the last few centuries BCE. Extant ancient manuscripts of the Septuagint version include Codex Vaticanus (B; $\mathfrak{G}$^{B}; 4th century), Codex Sinaiticus (S; BHK: $\mathfrak{G}$^{S}; 4th century), Codex Alexandrinus (A; $\mathfrak{G}$^{A}; 5th century) and Codex Marchalianus (Q; $\mathfrak{G}$^{Q}; 6th century).

== Parashot ==
The parashah sections listed here are based on the Aleppo Codex. Isaiah 17 is a part of the Prophecies about the Nations (Isaiah 13–23). {P}: open parashah; {S}: closed parashah.

{P} 17:1-3 {P} 17:4-8 {S} 17:9-11 {S} 17:12-14 {P}

== Verse 1 ==
The burden of Damascus.

Behold, Damascus is taken away from being a city,

and it shall be a ruinous heap.

- "Burden" (Hebrew: מַשָּׂ֖א mashā): the keyword in the superscriptions for a total of nine similar oracles; the others being: Isaiah 13:1; 15:1; 19:1; 21:1, 11, 13; 22:1; 23:1.

== Verse 2 ==
The cities of Aroer are forsaken

In the Septuagint, the wording is abandoned for ever, referring to Damascus (from verse 1), not Aroer in Moab. Anglican Bishop Robert Lowth preferred to use the Septuagint translation: "What has Aroer ... on the river Arnon, (see Deuteronomy 2:36) to do with Damascus?” Hugo Grotius, however, thought the Hebrew text was correct, and that this Aroer was a tract of ground in Syria.

A marginal note in the Masoretic Text tradition indicates that Isaiah 17:2 is the middle of the whole Nevi'im (Book of Prophets) section in Hebrew.

== See also ==
- Aroer
- Damascus
- Ephraim
- Jacob
- Rephaim
- Syria
- Related Bible parts: Mark 4

== Sources ==
- Childs, Brevard S. (2001). Isaiah. Westminster John Knox Press. ISBN 9780664221430.
- Würthwein, Ernst (1995). The Text of the Old Testament. Translated by Rhodes, Erroll F. Grand Rapids, MI: Wm. B. Eerdmans. ISBN 0-8028-0788-7.
