= Isaiah 19 =

Book of Isaiah, chapter 19

- ← chapter 18 chapter 20 →
- The Great Isaiah Scroll, the best preserved of the biblical scrolls found at Qumran from the second century BC, contains all the verses in this chapter.
- Book: Book of Isaiah
- Hebrew Bible part: Nevi'im
- Order in the Hebrew part: 5
- Category: Latter Prophets
- Christian Bible part: Old Testament
- Order in the Christian part: 23

Isaiah 19 is the nineteenth chapter of the Book of Isaiah in the Hebrew Bible or the Old Testament of the Christian Bible. This book contains the prophecies attributed to the prophet Isaiah, and is one of the Books of the Prophets. This chapter focuses on Egypt.

== Text ==
The original text was written in Hebrew. This chapter is divided into 25 verses.

=== Textual witnesses ===
Some early manuscripts containing the text of this chapter in Hebrew are of the Masoretic Text tradition, which includes the Codex Cairensis (895), the Petersburg Codex of the Prophets (916), Aleppo Codex (10th century), Codex Leningradensis (1008).

Fragments containing parts of this chapter were found among the Dead Sea Scrolls (3rd century BC or later):

- 1QIsa^{a}: complete
- 1QIsa^{b}: extant: verses 1, 7‑17, 20‑25
- 4QIsa^{a} (4Q55): extant: verses 9‑14
- 4QIsa^{b} (4Q56): complete

There is also a translation into Koine Greek known as the Septuagint, made in the last few centuries BC. Extant ancient manuscripts of the Septuagint version include Codex Vaticanus (B; $\mathfrak{G}$^{B}; 4th century), Codex Sinaiticus (S; BHK: $\mathfrak{G}$^{S}; 4th century), Codex Alexandrinus (A; $\mathfrak{G}$^{A}; 5th century) and Codex Marchalianus (Q; $\mathfrak{G}$^{Q}; 6th century).

== Parashot ==
The parashah sections listed here are based on the Aleppo Codex. Isaiah 19 is a part of the Prophecies about the Nations (Isaiah 13–23). {P}: open parashah; {S}: closed parashah.

{S} 19:1-17 {S} 19:18 {S} 19:19-22 {S} 19:23 {S} 19:24-25 {S}

== Structure ==
German theologian Franz Delitzsch regards Isaiah 19:16–17 as a connecting link between two contrasting pictures of Egypt's future: the prospect of judgment in Isaiah 19:1–15 and the remoter prospect of conversion and prosperity in Isaiah 19:18–25.

== Proclamation against Egypt ==
=== Verse 1 ===
The burden against Egypt.

Behold, the Lord rides on a swift cloud,

And will come into Egypt;

The idols of Egypt will totter at His presence,

And the heart of Egypt will melt in its midst.

- "Burden" (Hebrew: מַשָּׂ֖א mashā): "oracle, prophecy"; the keyword in the superscriptions for a total of nine similar oracles; the others being: Isaiah 13:1; 15:1; 17:1; 21:1, 11, 13; 22:1; 23:1.
- "Totter": "shake"

== Verse 13 ==
The princes of Zoan have become fools;
The princes of Noph are deceived;
They have also deluded Egypt,
Those who are the mainstay of its tribes.

- "Princes": here refer to a group of expert counselors of the Egyptian Pharaoh; despite their renowned wisdom they are mock as incapable.
- Noph (or Moph) was the Hebrew name for the ancient city of Memphis.

== Verse 15 ==
Neither shall there be any work for Egypt,

which the head or tail, branch or rush, may do.

- "the head or tail": see Isaiah 9:14–16. Isaiah 9:15 gives the following interpretation of the terms:

"The elder and honorable, he is the head;

The prophet who teaches lies, he is the tail."

== Verse 18 ==
In that day five cities in the land of Egypt will speak the language of Canaan and swear by the Lord of hosts: one will be called the City of Destruction.

Some Hebrew manuscripts, the Arabic text, the Dead Sea Scrolls, Targum, and Vulgate refer to the Sun, while the Septuagint reads Asedek (literally Righteousness). The name "City of the Sun" is used in the Revised Standard Version and New International Version. John Wycliffe used the Greek name Heliopolis.

== See also ==
- Canaan
- Egypt
- Nile
- Noph (ancient Memphis)
- Pharaoh
- Zoan
- Related Bible parts: Isaiah 9, Revelation 4, Revelation 20

== Sources ==
- Childs, Brevard S. (2001). Isaiah. Westminster John Knox Press. ISBN 9780664221430.
- Coggins, R. (2007). "22. Isaiah". In Barton, John; Muddiman, John (eds.). The Oxford Bible Commentary (first (paperback) ed.). Oxford University Press. pp. 433–486. ISBN 978-0199277186.
- Ulrich, Eugene, ed. (2010). The Biblical Qumran Scrolls: Transcriptions and Textual Variants. Brill. ISBN 9789004181830.
- Würthwein, Ernst (1995). The Text of the Old Testament. Translated by Rhodes, Erroll F. Grand Rapids, MI: Wm. B. Eerdmans. ISBN 0-8028-0788-7.
