= Shebna =

Biblical figure

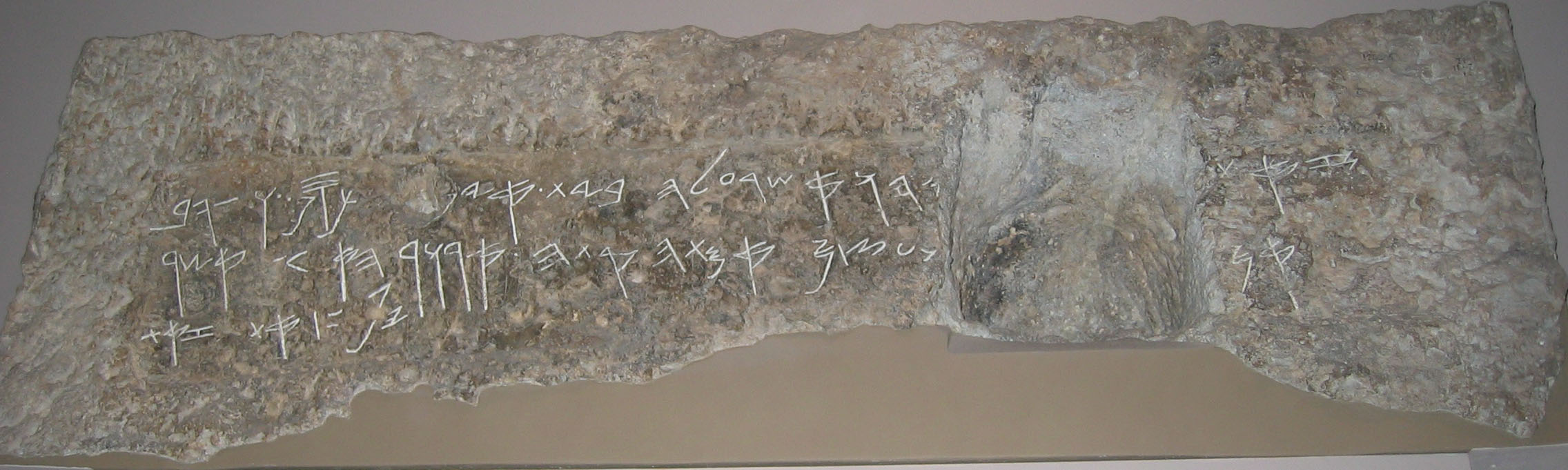
The Royal Steward inscription, a lintel of a tomb found in the village of Silwan, now in the British Museum

Shebna (Hebrew: שֶׁבְנָא, Modern: Ševna, Tiberian: Šeḇnā, "tender youth") was the royal steward (`asher `al ha-bayith, "he who is over the house"; the chief or prime minister of state) in the reign of king Hezekiah of Judah, according to the Hebrew Bible.

Because of his pride he was ejected from his office, and replaced by Eliakim the son of Hilkiah as recorded in Book of Isaiah (Isaiah 22:15–25). Shebna also appears to have been the leader of the party who favored an alliance with Egypt against Assyria.

== Biblical accounts ==
Shebna may have been the same "Shebna the scribe" who was sent by Hezekiah to confer with the Assyrian ambassador recorded in the Books of Kings (2 Kings 18:18, 26, 37; 2 Kings 19:2; parallel accounts in Isaiah 36:3, 11, 22; 37:2), although Easton's Bible Dictionary refers to them as being different people.

== Tomb and inscription ==
A royal steward's rock-cut tomb discovered in Silwan is conjectured to be Shebna's, although only the term "-yahu" remains legible on the lintel from the tomb that is now kept in the British Museum. The partially preserved inscription was deciphered to read "...yahu who is over the house". The assumption is that Shebna's name may have been pronounced 'Shebna-yahu', the missing name fitting onto the damaged portion of the inscription.

== See also ==
- Hezekiah
- Siloam Inscription
- List of artifacts significant to the Bible
- Related Bible parts: 2 Kings 18, 2 Kings 19, Isaiah 22, Isaiah 36, Isaiah 37, Nehemiah 9
