= Isaiah 21 =

Book of Isaiah, chapter 21

- ← chapter 20 chapter 22 →
- The Great Isaiah Scroll, the best preserved of the biblical scrolls found at Qumran from the second century BC, contains all the verses in this chapter.
- Book: Book of Isaiah
- Hebrew Bible part: Nevi'im
- Order in the Hebrew part: 5
- Category: Latter Prophets
- Christian Bible part: Old Testament
- Order in the Christian part: 23

Isaiah 21 is the twenty-first chapter of the Book of Isaiah in the Hebrew Bible or the Old Testament of the Christian Bible. This book contains the prophecies attributed to the prophet Isaiah, and is one of the Books of the Prophets. This chapter contains prophecies against Babylon, Edom and Arabia.

== Text ==
The original text was written in Hebrew language. This chapter is divided into 17 verses.

=== Textual witnesses ===
Some early manuscripts containing the text of this chapter in Hebrew are of the Masoretic Text tradition, which includes the Codex Cairensis (895), the Petersburg Codex of the Prophets (916), Aleppo Codex (10th century), Codex Leningradensis (1008).

Fragments containing parts of this chapter were found among the Dead Sea Scrolls (3rd century BC or later):

- 1QIsa^{a}: complete
- 4QIsa^{a} (4Q55): extant: verses 1‑2, 4‑16
- 4QIsa^{b} (4Q56): extant: verses 11‑14

There is also a translation into Koine Greek known as the Septuagint, made in the last few centuries BCE. Extant ancient manuscripts of the Septuagint version include Codex Vaticanus (B; $\mathfrak{G}$^{B}; 4th century), Codex Sinaiticus (S; BHK: $\mathfrak{G}$^{S}; 4th century), Codex Alexandrinus (A; $\mathfrak{G}$^{A}; 5th century) and Codex Marchalianus (Q; $\mathfrak{G}$^{Q}; 6th century).

== Parashot ==
The parashah sections listed here are based on the Aleppo Codex. Isaiah 21 is a part of the Prophecies about the Nations (Isaiah 13–23). {P}: open parashah; {S}: closed parashah.

{P} 21:1-5 {S} 21:6-10 {P} 21:11-12 {P} 21:13-15 {S} 21:16-17 {S}

== Proclamation against Babylon (21:1–10) ==
This part of prophecy or oracle refers clearly to Babylon, although it is not indicated by name, as understood, among others, by Coggins and Rashi.

=== Verse 1 ===
The burden against the Wilderness of the Sea

As whirlwinds in the South pass through,
So it comes from the desert, from a terrible land.

The Septuagint does not include the words "of the Sea":

As though a whirlwind should pass through the desert, coming from a desert, even from such a land, so a fearful and a grievous vision was declared to me.

The Cambridge Bible for Schools and Colleges notes the sub-heading in this verse as one (and the first) of "a series of 'enigmatic' headings", along with Isaiah 21:11, 13, and Isaiah 22:1 (cf. Isaiah 30:6). Rabbi Jonathan is quoted by Rashi to render this verse: "A harsh prophecy concerning the armies that come from the desert, as numerous as the waters of the sea."

- "Burden" (Hebrew: מַשָּׂ֖א maś-śā): the keyword in the superscriptions for a total of nine similar oracles; the others being: Isaiah 13:1; 15:1; 17:1; 19:1; Isaiah 21:11, 13; 22:1; 23:1.

=== Verse 9 ===
"And look, here comes a chariot of men with a pair of horsemen!"

Then he answered and said,

"Babylon is fallen, is fallen!
And all the carved images of her gods
He has broken to the ground."

Cross reference: Jeremiah 51:8; Isaiah 46:1

- "Babylon is fallen, is fallen": the event is prophesied in a vision.

== Proclamation against Edom (21:11–12) ==
^{11}The burden against Dumah.

He calls to me out of Seir,

"Watchman, what of the night?
Watchman, what of the night?"

^{12}The watchman said,

"The morning comes, and also the night.
If you will inquire, inquire;
Return! Come back!"

The Masoretic Text refers to Dumah, whereas the Septuagint refers to Edom, as do the NASB and NLT.

- "Burden" (Hebrew: מַשָּׂ֖א mashā): "oracle, prophecy"; the keyword in the superscriptions for a total of nine similar oracles; the others being: Isaiah 13:1; 15:1; 17:1; 19:1; Isaiah 21:1, 13; 22:1; 23:1.

== Proclamation against Arabia (21:13–17) ==
The phrase "the desert plain" may not point to an identifiable place, although the geographical area named is usually considered in Arabia. The oasis city Tema (verse 14) is located 100 miles (160 km) south of Elath and 200 miles (320 km) east of the Red Sea, known to be a caravan center. The Dedanites (verse 13) and Kedar (verse 16) were Arabian tribes. It is recorded that Kedar paid tribute in 738 BCE to the Assyrians and in 715 BCE Sargon II battled the tribes between Tema and the Gulf of Aqaba (the eastern arm of the Red Sea), then in 703 BCE Sennacherib subdued the Arabian tribes joining the rebellion of Merodach-Baladan (king of Babylon). Therefore, there is no need to consider a later date for this part of prophecy.

This passage is closely linked to the Book of Jeremiah (cf. Jeremiah 49:8).

=== Verse 13 ===
The burden against Arabia.

In the forest in Arabia you will lodge,
O you traveling companies of Dedanites.

- "Burden" (Hebrew: מַשָּׂ֖א mashā): "oracle, prophecy"; the keyword in the superscriptions for a total of nine similar oracles; the others being: Isaiah 13:1; 15:1; 17:1; 19:1; Isaiah 21:1, 11; 22:1; 23:1.

== See also ==
- Arabia
- Babylon
- Edom
- Related Bible parts: Psalm 92, Psalm 93, Isaiah 46, Revelation 14, Revelation 17, Revelation 18

== Sources ==
- Childs, Brevard S. (2001). Isaiah. Westminster John Knox Press. ISBN 9780664221430.
- Coggins, R (2007). "22. Isaiah". In Barton, John; Muddiman, John (eds.). The Oxford Bible Commentary (first (paperback) ed.). Oxford University Press. pp. 433–586. ISBN 978-0199277186.
- Motyer, J. Alec (2015). The Prophecy of Isaiah: An Introduction & Commentary. InterVarsity Press. ISBN 9780830895243.
- Ulrich, Eugene, ed. (2010). The Biblical Qumran Scrolls: Transcriptions and Textual Variants. Brill.
- Würthwein, Ernst (1995). The Text of the Old Testament. Translated by Rhodes, Erroll F. Grand Rapids, MI: Wm. B. Eerdmans. ISBN 0-8028-0788-7.
