= Royal Steward inscription =

Proto-Hebrew inscription found in the village of Silwan in 1870

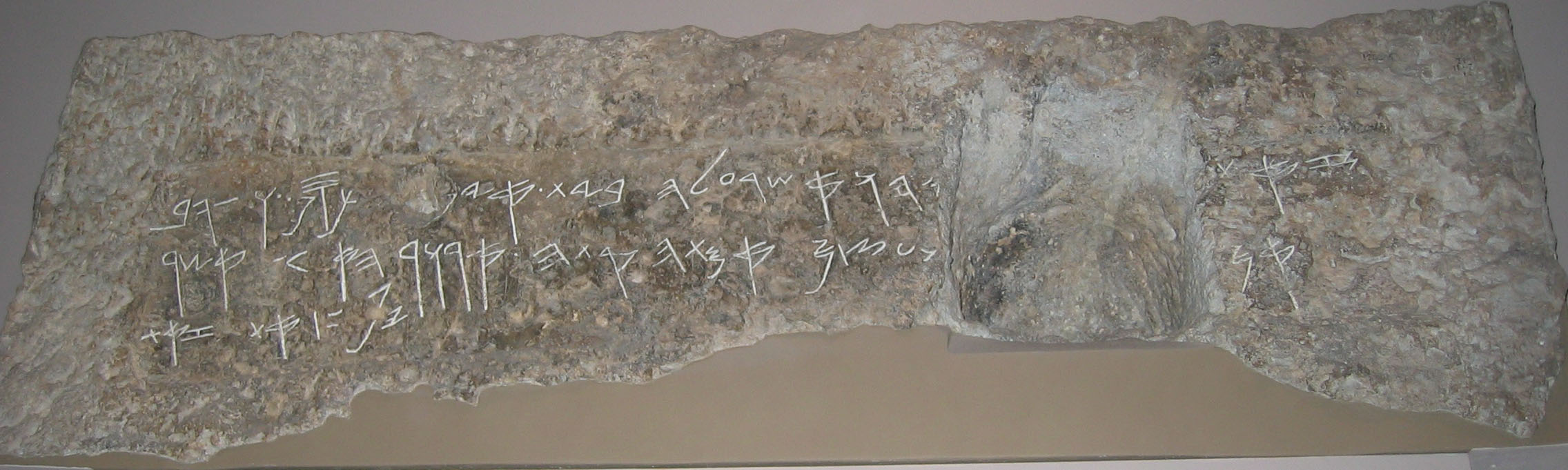
- Royal Steward inscription
- Material: Limestone
- Size: 160 cm long, 52 cm high
- Writing: Phoenician or Paleo-Hebrew script
- Created: 7th century BCE
- Discovered: 1870
- Present location: British Museum, London
- Identification: 1871,1107.1, WA 125205

The Royal Steward Inscription, known as KAI 191, is an important Proto-Hebrew inscription found in the village of Silwan outside Jerusalem in 1870. After passing through various hands, the inscription was purchased by the British Museum in 1871.

The inscription is broken at the point where the tomb's owner would have been named, but biblical scholars have conjectured a connection to Shebna, on the basis of a verse in the Bible mentioning a royal steward who was admonished for building a conspicuous tomb.

It was found by Charles Simon Clermont-Ganneau, about a decade prior to the Siloam inscription, making it the first ancient Hebrew inscription found in modern times. Clermont-Ganneau wrote about three decades later: "I may observe, by the way, that the discovery of these two texts was made long before that of the inscription in the tunnel, and therefore, though people in general do not seem to recognise this fact, it was the first which enabled us to behold an authentic specimen of Hebrew monumental epigraphy of the period of the Kings of Judah."

The text is considered to have a "remarkable" similarity to that of the Tabnit sarcophagus from Sidon.

== Discovery ==
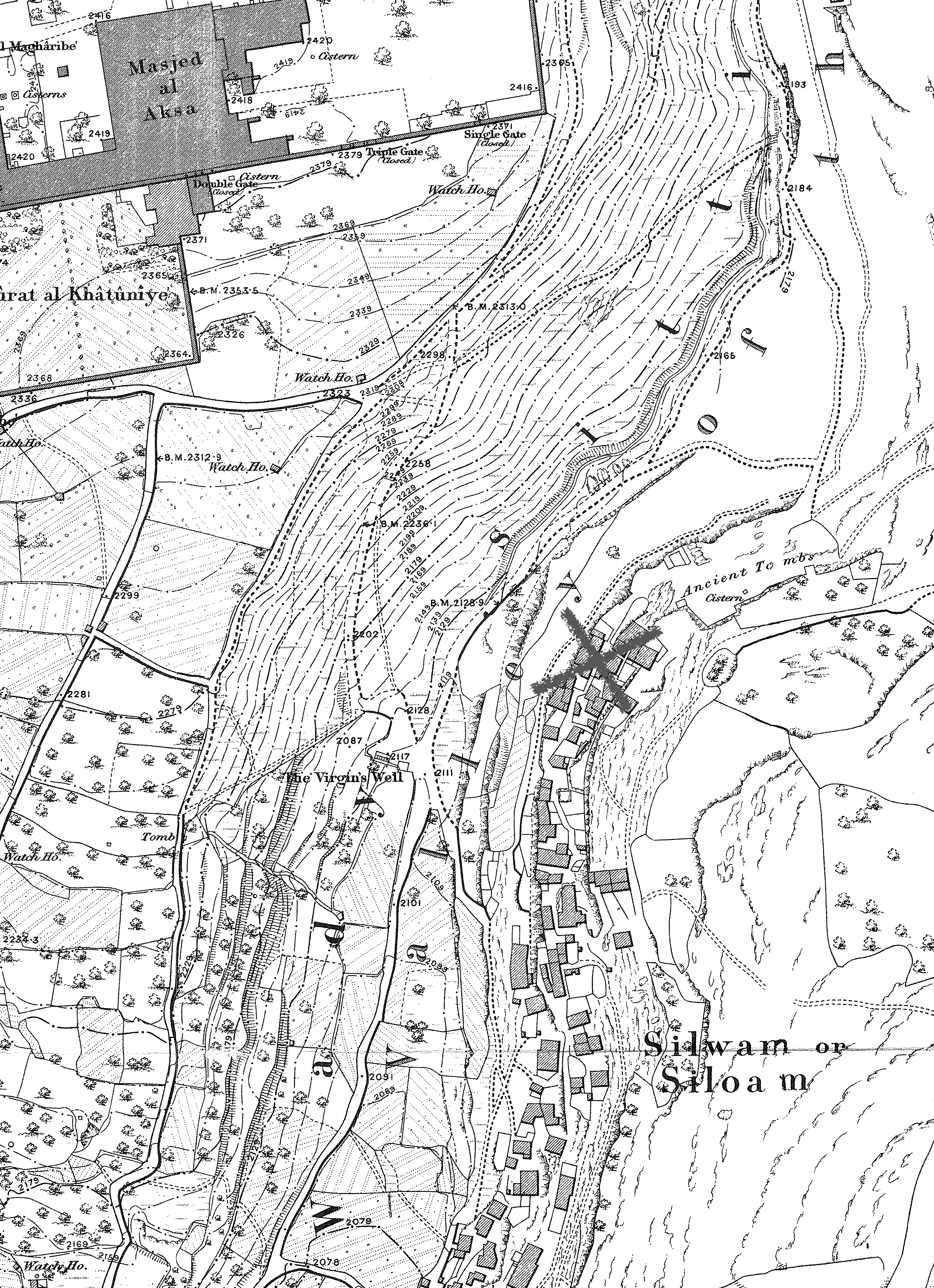
The inscription was found on a house in the village of Silwan (see the "x" mark). This map is from the Ordnance Survey of Jerusalem, published just a few years prior to the inscription's discovery.

The inscribed lintel was found by French archaeologist, Charles Simon Clermont-Ganneau in 1870 above the entrance to a home in Silwan, a village south of Jerusalem. Clermont-Ganneau first published the discovery in the Quarterly Statement of the Palestinian Exploration Fund, but with little detail:

Hebrew inscription in Phoenician characters. This inscription, discovered by myself several months ago, is the only monumental text which goes back to the time of the kings of Judah. It belongs authentically, by the very position which it occupies, to the history of Jerusalem. I cannot yet publicly point out its origin, in order not to interfere with the steps taken for its preservation. I will confine myself to saying that it has probably a religious signification, as is proved by the words beit and Baal, which are very distinctly to be read.

Clermont-Ganneau arranged for the inscription to be purchased and removed by the British Museum one year after its discovery. Almost thirty years later, in 1899, he published a detailed description of the discovery.

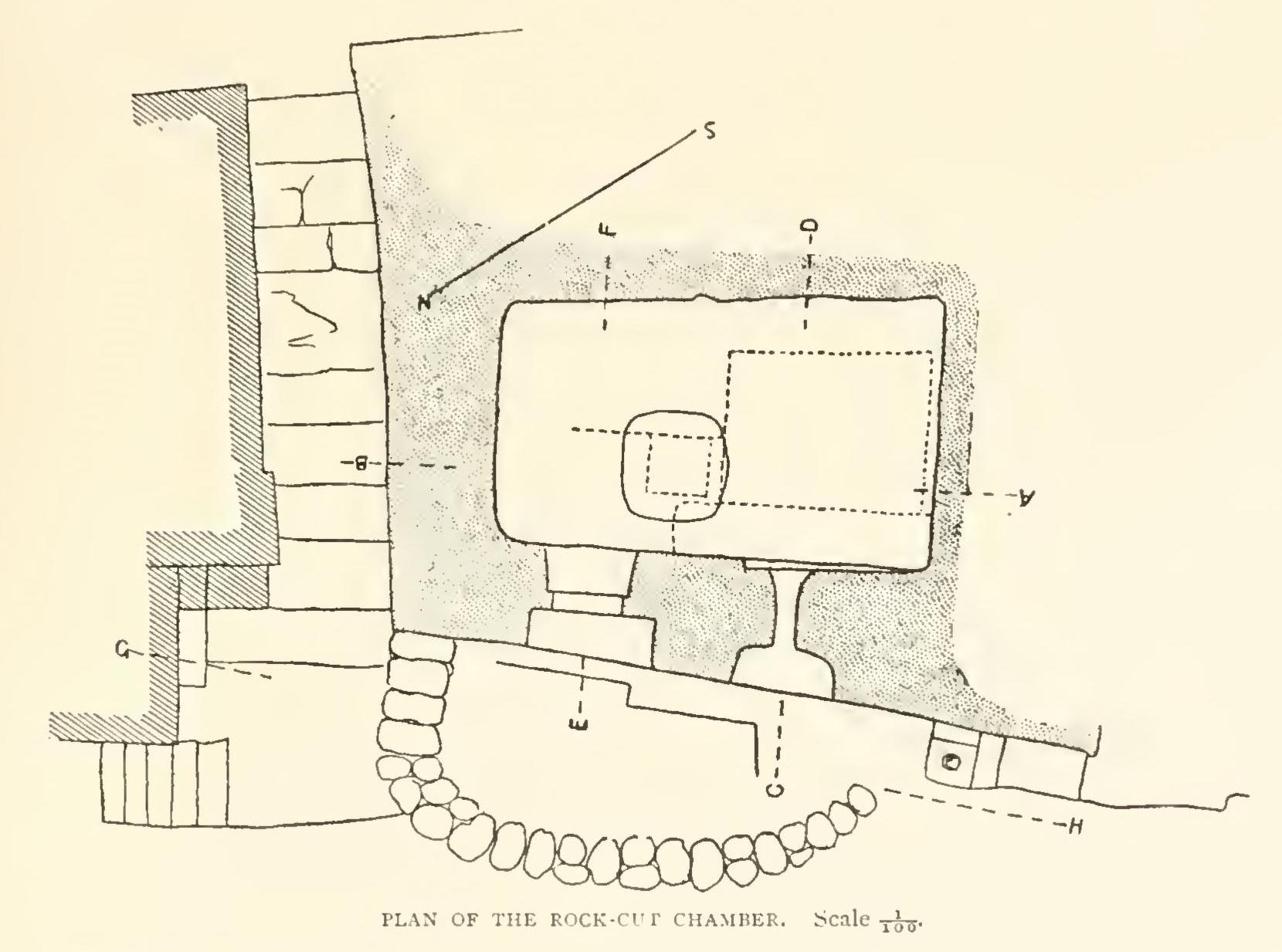
Findspot, top down view

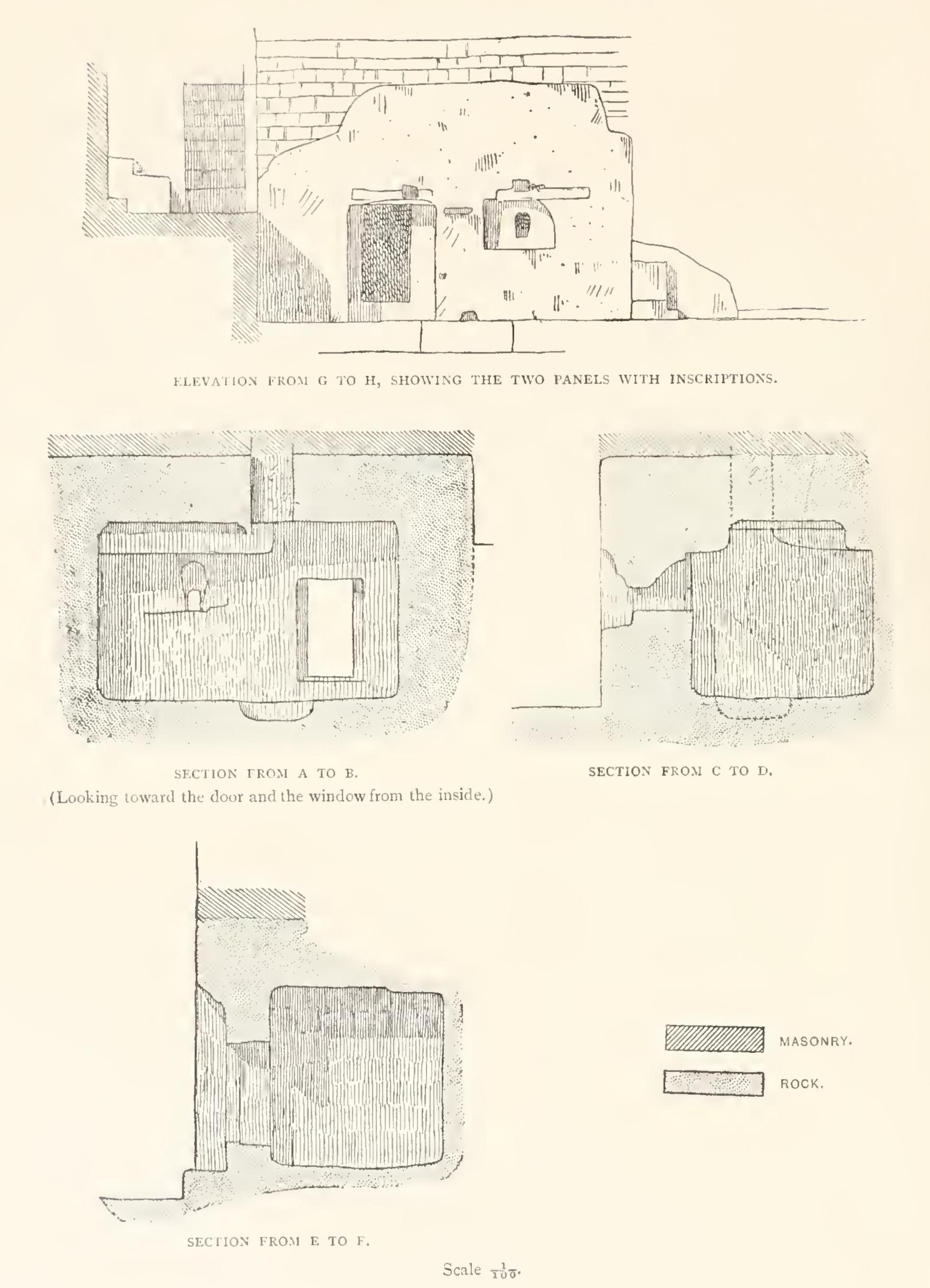
Findspot, elevations

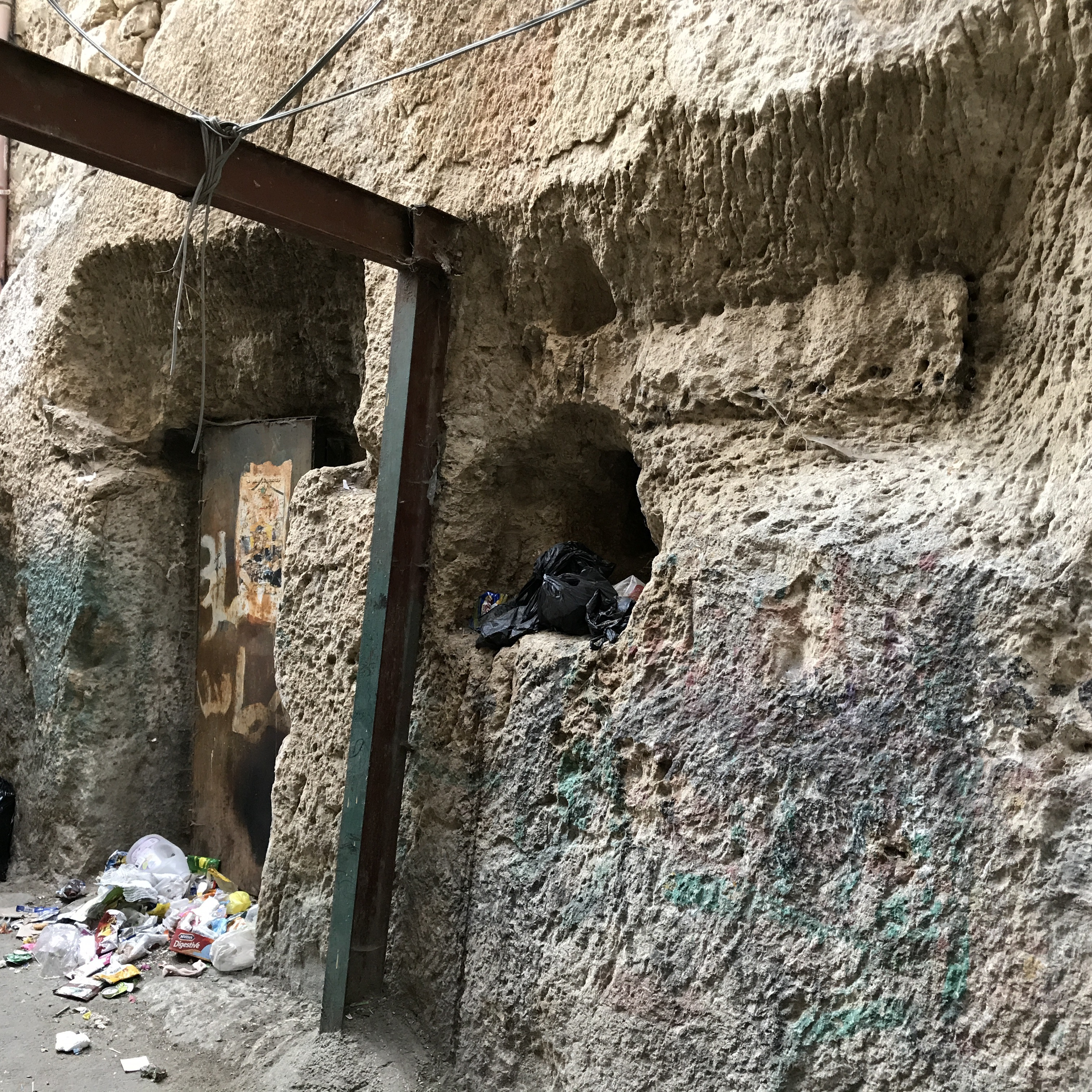
Original location of the inscription

== Inscription text ==
The limestone inscription was so severely damaged that it has not been possible to completely decipher the script. The writing is in Biblical Hebrew in the Phoenician or Paleo-Hebrew script – at the time of its discovery the script was referred to as "Phoenician letters" – and can be dated to the 7th century BCE.

| Script | 𐤆𐤀𐤕 . . . . . . . 𐤉𐤄𐤅 𐤀𐤔𐤓 𐤏𐤋𐤄 𐤁𐤉𐤕. 𐤀𐤉𐤍[ 𐤐𐤄] 𐤊𐤎𐤐. 𐤅𐤆𐤄𐤁. 𐤀𐤌 . . . . . . . 𐤅𐤏𐤑𐤌𐤅[𐤕] 𐤀𐤌𐤕𐤄 𐤀𐤕𐤄. 𐤀𐤓𐤅𐤓 𐤄𐤀[𐤃𐤌] 𐤀𐤔𐤓 𐤉𐤐[𐤕𐤇] 𐤀𐤕 𐤆𐤀𐤕 |
| Hebrew | זאת . . . . . . . יהו אשר עלה בית. אין[ פה] כסף. וזהב. אם . . . . . . . ועצמו[ת] אמתה אתה. ארור הא[דם] אשר יפ[תח] את זאת |
| Transliteration | z't . . . . . . . yhw 'šr ‘lh byt. 'y[n ph] ksp w[z]hb 'm . . . . . . . w‘ṣmw[t] 'mth '[t]h. 'rwr h'[dm] 'šr yp[tḥ] '[t] z't |
| Romanization | Zōʾt . . . . . . . -yāhū ʾăšer ʿal habayīt. ʾēy[n pō] kesef wə[zā]hāḇ. ʾīm . . . . . . . wəʿaṣm[ōt] ʾămātō ʾī[t]ō. ʾārūr hāʿā[dām] ʾăšer yīp[taḥ] ʾe[t] zōʾt |
| Translation | This . . . . . . . -iah, the royal steward. There i[s no] silver or [go]ld here only . . . . . . . and the bone[s] of his maidservant with him. Cursed be the m[an] who op[ens] this |

The three words "אשר על הבית" gave rise to the English translation "royal steward", although this is not a literal translation – the three words literally mean simply "whom/which (is) over the house", i.e. the one who oversees the house. Using parallels to biblical passages it has been variously translated "upon the house", "steward of the house" or "governor of the house".

The word אמתה ('mth), read ʾămātō, literally means "his maidservant" (Biblical אמה ʾamah), but is often translated "his concubine", due to the context of her being buried with him with honors, and consistent with the occasional Biblical usage of the word אמה implying a concubine rather than a maidservant (Hagar, Abraham's concubine who bears him his firstborn son Ishmael, is referred to as אמה).

The third person masculine possessive (amato = his amah) is spelled אמתה, instead אמתו as is usual in the Bible, consistent with early Hebrew spelling, before ו (vav) replaced ה (heh) as the mater lectionis for the "o" sound at the end of words (the Mesha Stele, in a Canaanite dialect almost identical to Hebrew, spells ארצה 𐤀𐤓𐤑𐤄 for artzo "his land" and בנה 𐤁𐤍𐤄 for bno "his son". Genesis sometimes spells אהלה instead of אהלו for ohalo "his tent").

== Shebna ==
The royal steward or court chamberlain was a powerful figure in Ancient Judah. According to the Book of Isaiah (Isaiah 22:15–16), the royal steward appointed by King Hezekiah was called Shebna and he was admonished for building himself too grandiose a tomb. Although the name of the royal steward is broken at the point where the official is named, it has been conjectured on the basis of the biblical verse that this monumental inscription originates from the tomb of Shebna.

Clermont-Ganneau speculated in 1899 that the tomb could be that of the Shebna mentioned in Isaiah, but described the idea as a "sanguine illusion". In the early 1950s, the idea was suggested again by Yigael Yadin, the Israeli Army Chief of the General Staff, who was later to become an archaeologist. Nahman Avigad assessed the proposal, based upon the similarity of the text to that of the Siloam inscription and the fact that biblical story of Shebna took place during the reign of King Hezekiah (715–687 BCE), describing it as a "highly conjectural suggestion".

== See also ==
- Isaiah 22
- Siloam inscription
- Silwan necropolis

== Bibliography ==
- Avigad, Nahman (1953). "The Epitaph of a Royal Steward from Siloam Village". Israel Exploration Journal. 3 (3). Israel Exploration Society: 137–152. ISSN 0021-2059. JSTOR 27924525.
- F. Frances (Ed), Treasures of the British Museum, London, 1972
- D. Colon, Ancient Near East Art, British Museum Press, London, 1995
