= Eliakim, son of Hilkiah =

Biblical character, son of Hilkiah

Eliakim (Hebrew: אֶלְיָקִים, romanized: Elyāqim, Greek: Ελιακιμ, Latin: Eliachim) was the son of Hilkiah. He succeeded Shebna to become royal steward or prime minister for King Hezekiah of Judah, according to the Hebrew Bible.

== Archaeology ==
Found in 1974, an unprovenanced 8th century BC bulla, allegedly coming from the Hebron district, was acquired on the antiquities market by the Israel Museum for its Hebrew seals section, and its legend reads "(Belonging to) Yehozarah, son of Hilqi[ya]hu, servant of Hizqiyahu". Garfinkel suggests that the biblical reference of Eliakim as "son" of Hilkiah may be more precisely understood in the sense of descendance, as sometimes happens in other biblical passages. Written in the paleo-Hebrew alphabet, it is part of a larger group of artifacts known as Canaanite and Aramaic seal inscriptions.

In 2019, archaeologist Yosef Garfinkel claimed to have discovered a reference to Eliakim, son of Hilkiah, in two bullae unearthed at Tel Lachish. He described the seal legends as reading "Eliakim, (son of) Yehozarah".

== Name ==
In the biblical account, he is driven "like a peg" or "like a nail" into a firm place, in wording suggesting either a tent peg or a nail on which utensils might be hung.

== In the canon ==
- Book of Kings 2 Kings 18:18, 18:26, 18:37 and 19:2
- Book of Isaiah 22:20, 36:3, 36:11, 36:22 and 37:2

== See also ==
- List of inscriptions in Biblical archaeology
