= Isaiah 13 =

Book of Isaiah, chapter 13

- ← chapter 12 chapter 14 →
- The Great Isaiah Scroll, the best preserved of the biblical scrolls found at Qumran from the second century BC, contains all the verses in this chapter.
- Book: Book of Isaiah
- Hebrew Bible part: Nevi'im
- Order in the Hebrew part: 5
- Category: Latter Prophets
- Christian Bible part: Old Testament
- Order in the Christian part: 23

Isaiah 13 is the thirteenth chapter of the Book of Isaiah in the Hebrew Bible or the Old Testament of the Christian Bible. This book contains the prophecies attributed to the prophet Isaiah, and is one of the Books of the Prophets. In the New King James Version, the chapter is sub-titled "Proclamation Against Babylon".

== Text ==
The original text was written in Hebrew language. This chapter is divided into 22 verses.

- The American Old Testament scholar Brevard Childs links this chapter with the first part of chapter 14 as one section, composed of two units: 13:2-22 and 14:4b-21, "linked editorially" by an initial superscription (13:1) and two redactional units 14:1-4a and 22-23.

=== Textual witnesses ===
Some early manuscripts containing the text of this chapter in Hebrew are of the Masoretic Text tradition, which includes the Codex Cairensis (895), the Petersburg Codex of the Prophets (916), Aleppo Codex (10th century), Codex Leningradensis (1008).

Fragments containing parts of this chapter were found among the Dead Sea Scrolls (3rd century BC or later):

- 1QIsa^{a}: complete (150-125BC)
- 1QIsa^{b}: extant: verses 2‑5, 7‑8, 16, 18‑19
- 4QIsa^{a} (4Q55): extant: verses 4‑6
- 4QIsa^{b} (4Q56): extant: verses 3-18
- 4QIsa^{l} (4Q65): extant: verses 1‑4

There is also a translation into Koine Greek known as the Septuagint, made in the last few centuries BCE. Extant ancient manuscripts of the Septuagint version include Codex Vaticanus (B; $\mathfrak{G}$^{B}; 4th century), Codex Sinaiticus (S; BHK: $\mathfrak{G}$^{S}; 4th century), Codex Alexandrinus (A; $\mathfrak{G}$^{A}; 5th century) and Codex Marchalianus (Q; $\mathfrak{G}$^{Q}; 6th century).

== Parashot ==
The parashah sections listed here are based on the Aleppo Codex. Isaiah 13 is a part of the Prophecies about the Nations (Isaiah 13–23). {P}: open parashah; {S}: closed parashah.

{S} 13:1-5 {S} 13:6-22 [14:1-2 {S}]

== Verse 1 ==
The burden against Babylon which Isaiah the son of Amoz saw.

- "Burden" (Hebrew: מַשָּׂ֖א, maś-śā): the keyword in the superscriptions for a total of nine similar oracles; the others being: Isaiah 15:1; 17:1; 19:1; 21:1, 11, 13; 22:1; 23:1.

== Verse 2 ==
Lift up a banner on the high mountain (NKJV)

The ASV refers to "the bare mountain", i.e. "i.e. one denuded of trees, so that the signal might be clearly distinguished".

== Verse 17 ==
"Behold, I will stir up the Medes against them,

Who will not regard silver;

And as for gold, they will not delight in it." (NKJV)

- Cross reference: Isaiah 21:2; Isaiah 44:28; Isaiah 45:1; Jeremiah 51:11

This verse makes clear that Babylon was to fall at the hand of the Medes, probably under the leadership of Cyrus the Great. The Medes are specified by name as the instrument of God's wrath, pointing to a historical setting in the sixth century, but according to Childs, significantly "portrayed as a still future event, and ... not to be interpreted as a late postexilic retrojection of the events in 539" BC when Medes (and Persia) actually conquered Babylon.

== Verse 21 ==
Desert animals will move into the ruined city.

Owls, ostriches and goats are identified as examples.

== See also ==
- Arabia
- Babylon
- Chaldea
- Medes
- Ophir
- Sodom and Gomorrah
- Related Bible parts: Genesis 10, Isaiah 21, Isaiah 44, Isaiah 45, Jeremiah 51, Daniel 5

== Sources ==
- Childs, Brevard S. (2001). Isaiah. Westminster John Knox Press. ISBN 9780664221430.
- Ulrich, Eugene, ed. (2010). The Biblical Qumran Scrolls: Transcriptions and Textual Variants. Brill.
- Würthwein, Ernst (1995). The Text of the Old Testament. Translated by Rhodes, Erroll F. Grand Rapids, MI: Wm. B. Eerdmans. ISBN 0-8028-0788-7.
