= Amoz =

Father of Isaiah

Amoz /ˈeɪmɒz/ (Hebrew: אָמוֹץ, Modern: ʼAmōṣ, Tiberian: ʼĀmōṣ), also known as Amotz, was the father of the prophet Isaiah, mentioned in Isaiah 1:1; 2:1 and 13:1, and in II Kings 19:2, 20; 20:1. The word "amoz" means strong.

== Rabbinical tradition ==
There is a Talmudic tradition that when the name of a prophet's father is given, the father was also a prophet, so that Amoz would have been a prophet like his son. Though it is mentioned frequently as the patronymic title of Isaiah, the name Amoz appears nowhere else in the Bible. The rabbis of the Talmud declared, based upon a rabbinic tradition, that Amoz was the brother of Amaziah (אמציה), the king of Judah at that time (and, as a result, that Isaiah himself was a member of the royal family). According to some traditions, Amoz is the "man of God" in 2 Chronicles 25:7–9 (Seder Olam Rabbah 20), who cautioned Amaziah to release the Israelite mercenaries that he had hired.
