= Isaiah 23 =

Book of Isaiah, chapter 23

- ← chapter 22 chapter 24 →
- The Great Isaiah Scroll, the best preserved of the biblical scrolls found at Qumran from the second century BC, contains all the verses in this chapter.
- Book: Book of Isaiah
- Hebrew Bible part: Nevi'im
- Order in the Hebrew part: 5
- Category: Latter Prophets
- Christian Bible part: Old Testament
- Order in the Christian part: 23

Isaiah 23 is the twenty-third chapter of the Book of Isaiah in the Hebrew Bible or the Old Testament of the Christian Bible. This book contains the prophecies attributed to the prophet Isaiah, and is one of the Books of the Prophets. This chapter foretells the destruction of Tyre due to its pride (Isaiah 23:1-14), its rising again (Isaiah 23:15-17), and its conversion to God (Isaiah 23:18).

== Text ==
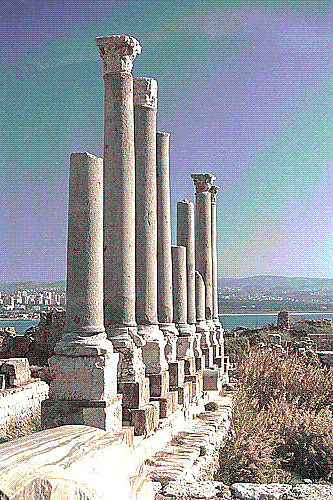
The ruins of Tyre

Map of ancient Tartessos (identified as Tarshish)

The original text was written in Hebrew language. This chapter is divided into 18 verses.

=== Textual witnesses ===
Some early manuscripts containing the text of this chapter in Hebrew are of the Masoretic Text tradition, which includes the Codex Cairensis (895), the Petersburg Codex of the Prophets (916), Aleppo Codex (10th century), Codex Leningradensis (1008).

Fragments containing parts of this chapter were found among the Dead Sea Scrolls (3rd century BC or later):

- 1QIsa^{a}: complete
- 1QIsa^{b}: extant verses 1‑5
- 4QIsa^{a} (4Q55): extant verses 1‑12
- 4QIsa^{c} (4Q57): extant verses 8‑18

There is also a translation into Koine Greek known as the Septuagint, made in the last few centuries BCE. Extant ancient manuscripts of the Septuagint version include Codex Vaticanus (B; $\mathfrak{G}$^{B}; 4th century), Codex Sinaiticus (S; BHK: $\mathfrak{G}$^{S}; 4th century), Codex Alexandrinus (A; $\mathfrak{G}$^{A}; 5th century) and Codex Marchalianus (Q; $\mathfrak{G}$^{Q}; 6th century).

== Parashot ==
The parashah sections listed here are based on the Aleppo Codex. Isaiah 23 is a part of the Prophecies about the Nations (Isaiah 13–23). {P}: open parashah; {S}: closed parashah.

{P} 23:1-14 {S} 23:15-18 {P}

== Proclamation against Tyre ==
=== Verse 1 ===
The burden of Tyre.

Howl, ye ships of Tarshish; for it is laid waste, so that there is no house, no entering in:
from the land of Chittim it is revealed to them.

- "Burden" (Hebrew: מַשָּׂ֖א mashā): the keyword in the superscriptions for a total of nine similar oracles; the others being: Isaiah 13:1; 15:1; 17:1; 19:1; 21:1, 11, 13; 22:1.
- "Tyre" (Hebrew: צֹ֑ר Tsor written צוֺר in 1 Kings 5:15; Greek: Τυρος, Tyros; Phoenician צר; Assyrian ‚urru, (also in Tel Amarna); Egyptian Da-(ï)ra, Da-ru.): famous Phoenician city, which in ancient time was built on a "rock" (the original meaning of its name) offshore in the Mediterranean Sea. The city was already prosperous in 14th century BC as a major trading port. It was strongly fortified but at the end was laid waste after it was conquered by Alexander the Great. The modern city is the continuation of ancient extension of the city in the mainland.
- "Tarshish" (Hebrew: תרשיש Tar-shîsh): a faraway port, generally identified as "Tartessos" (Greek: Ταρτησσός) in Spain, located in the mouth of Guadalquivir river, where the Phoenicians are said to establish the first anchorage grounds and deal in precious metals. Other possibilities include: Tarsus in Cilicia, Tyrseni in Etruscan/Tuscany, or Carthage in North Africa.
- "Chittim" (or "Kittim"; Hebrew: כתים Kit-tîm): "Citienses", "Cypriotes" or "Cyprians", a Phoenecian colony in Citium (=Kition), Cyprus. The term is also used in general for places beyond Cyprus, as far as Greece.

== See also ==
- Assyria
- Egypt
- Chaldea
- Chittim (=Kittim)
- Shihor
- Sidon
- Tarshish
- Tyre
- Related Bible parts: 1 Kings 5, Jeremiah 47, Ezekiel 26, Joel 3, Amos 1

== Sources ==
- Brown, Francis; Briggs, Charles A.; Driver, S. R. (1994). The Brown-Driver-Briggs Hebrew and English Lexicon (reprint ed.). Hendrickson Publishers. ISBN 978-1565632066.
- Childs, Brevard S. (2001). Isaiah. Westminster John Knox Press. ISBN 9780664221430.
- Gesenius, H. W. F. (1979). Gesenius' Hebrew and Chaldee Lexicon to the Old Testament Scriptures: Numerically Coded to Strong's Exhaustive Concordance, with an English Index. Translated by Tregelles, Samuel Prideaux (7th ed.). Baker Book House.
- Ulrich, Eugene, ed. (2010). The Biblical Qumran Scrolls: Transcriptions and Textual Variants. Brill.
- Würthwein, Ernst (1995). The Text of the Old Testament. Translated by Rhodes, Erroll F. Grand Rapids, MI: Wm. B. Eerdmans. ISBN 0-8028-0788-7.
