= Jeremiah 48 =

Book of Jeremiah, chapter 48

- ← chapter 47 chapter 49 →
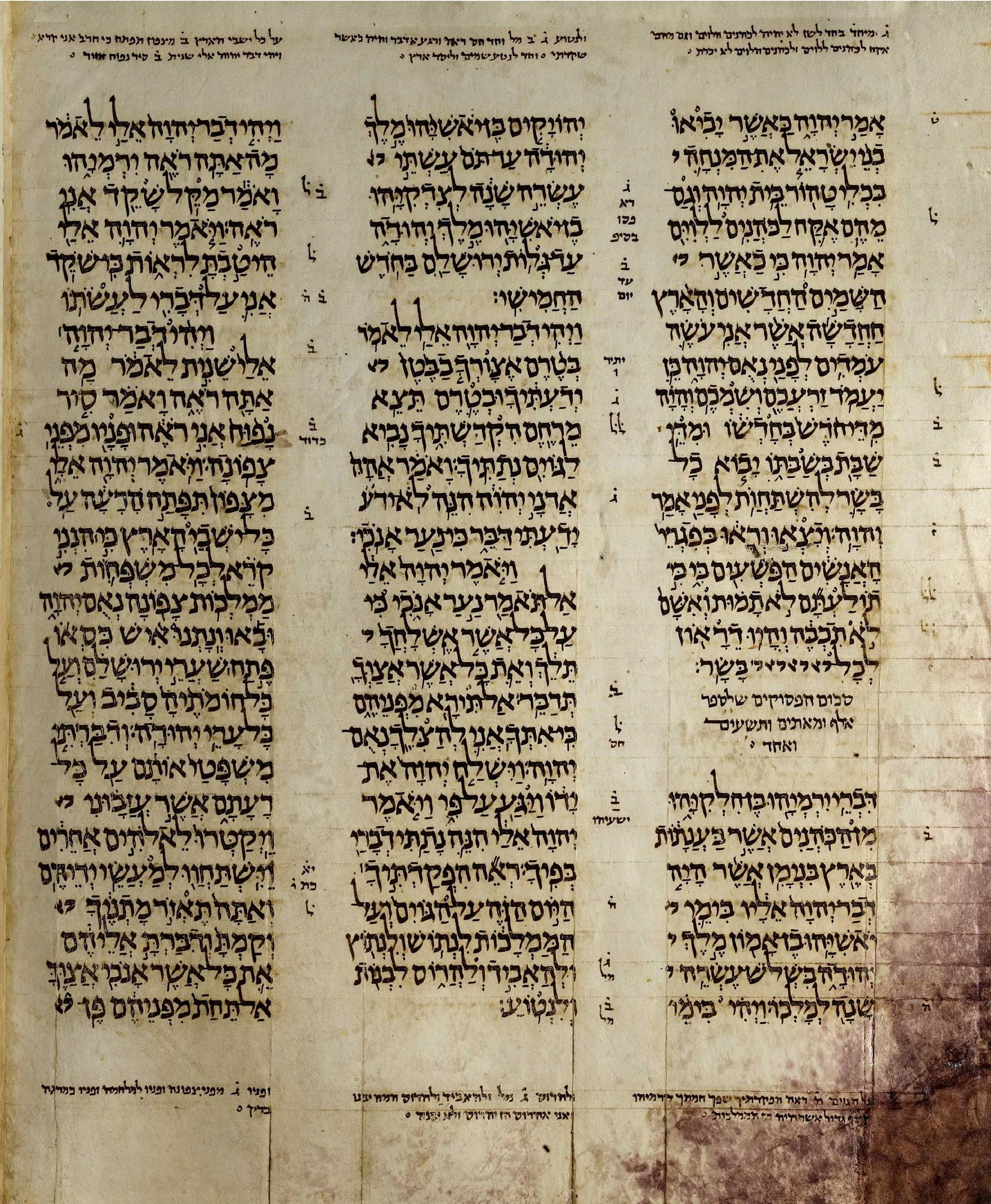
- A high resolution scan of the Aleppo Codex showing the Book of Jeremiah (the sixth book in Nevi'im).
- Book: Book of Jeremiah
- Hebrew Bible part: Nevi'im
- Order in the Hebrew part: 6
- Category: Latter Prophets
- Christian Bible part: Old Testament
- Order in the Christian part: 24

Jeremiah 48 is the forty-eighth chapter of the Book of Jeremiah in the Hebrew Bible or the Old Testament of the Christian Bible. This book contains prophecies attributed to the prophet Jeremiah, and is one of the Books of the Prophets. This chapter is part of a series of "oracles against foreign nations", consisting of chapters 46 to 51. In particular, chapters 46-49 focus on Judah's neighbors. This chapter contains the poetic oracles against Moab.

== Text ==
The original text was written in Hebrew. This chapter is divided into 47 verses.

=== Textual witnesses ===
Some early manuscripts containing the text of this chapter in Hebrew are of the Masoretic Text tradition, which includes the Codex Cairensis (895), the Petersburg Codex of the Prophets (916), Aleppo Codex (10th century), Codex Leningradensis (1008). Some fragments containing parts of this chapter were found among the Dead Sea Scrolls, i.e., 2QJer (2Q13; 1st century CE), with extant verses 2‑4, 7, 25‑39, 41‑45.

There is also a translation into Koine Greek known as the Septuagint (with a different chapter and verse numbering), made in the last few centuries BCE. Extant ancient manuscripts of the Septuagint version include Codex Vaticanus (B; $\mathfrak{G}$^{B}; 4th century), Codex Sinaiticus (S; BHK: $\mathfrak{G}$^{S}; 4th century), Codex Alexandrinus (A; $\mathfrak{G}$^{A}; 5th century) and Codex Marchalianus (Q; $\mathfrak{G}$^{Q}; 6th century). The Septuagint version doesn't contain a part which are generally known to be verses 45–46 in Christian Bibles.

== Parashot ==
The parashah sections listed here are based on the Aleppo Codex. Jeremiah 48 is a part of the prophecies in Jeremiah 46-49 in the section of Prophecies against the nations (Jeremiah 46-51). {P}: open parashah; {S}: closed parashah.

{P} 48:1-11 {S} 48:12-39 {S} 48:40-47 {S}

== Verse numbering ==
The order of chapters and verses of the Book of Jeremiah in the English Bibles, Masoretic Text (Hebrew), and Vulgate (Latin), in some places differs from that in the Septuagint (LXX, the Greek Bible used in the Eastern Orthodox Church and others) according to Rahlfs or Brenton. The following table is taken with minor adjustments from Brenton's Septuagint, page 971.

The order of Computer Assisted Tools for Septuagint/Scriptural Study (CATSS) based on Alfred Rahlfs' Septuaginta (1935) differs in some details from Joseph Ziegler's critical edition (1957) in Göttingen LXX. Swete's Introduction mostly agrees with Rahlfs' edition (=CATSS).

Hebrew, Vulgate, English	Rahlfs' LXX (CATSS)
48:1-45	31:1-45
48:45-47	n/a
41:1-18	48:1-18

== Structure ==
This chapter seems to be a sequence of three parts: verses 1–13; 14–38, and 39–45.

== Verse 1 ==
Against Moab.
Thus says the Lord of hosts, the God of Israel:

"Woe to Nebo!
For it is plundered,
Kirjathaim [is shamed] and taken;
The high stronghold is shamed and dismayed—

"Nebo" is identified with modern Khirbet Mekhayyet, 8 km (5.0 mi) southwest of Heshbon. The Septuagint omits the words 'is shamed'.

== Verse 7 ==
For because you have trusted in your works and in your treasures,

you will also be captured;

and Chemosh shall go forth into captivity

together with his priests and his officials.

- "Chemosh": was the national god of the Moabites. The downfall of Chemosh is repeated in verses 13 and 46.

== Verse 34 ==
For the waters of Nimrim also shall be desolate.

The same sentiment is expressed in Isaiah 15:16 in the prophet Isaiah's comparable oracle on Moab.

== See also ==
- Bethel
- Chemosh
- Dibon
- Elealeh
- Heshbon
- Holon
- Horonaim
- Jahaz
- Kerioth
- Luhith
- Mephaath
- Nebo
- Nimrim
- Zoar
- Related Bible part: Isaiah 15, Isaiah 16, Isaiah 24

== Bibliography ==
- Coogan, Michael David (2007). Coogan, Michael David; Brettler, Marc Zvi; Newsom, Carol Ann; Perkins, Pheme (eds.). The New Oxford Annotated Bible with the Apocryphal/Deuterocanonical Books: New Revised Standard Version, Issue 48 (Augmented 3rd ed.). Oxford University Press. ISBN 9780195288810.
- Huey, F. B. (1993). The New American Commentary - Jeremiah, Lamentations: An Exegetical and Theological Exposition of Holy Scripture, NIV Text. B&H Publishing Group. ISBN 9780805401165.
- O'Connor, Kathleen M. (2007). "23. Jeremiah". In Barton, John; Muddiman, John (eds.). The Oxford Bible Commentary (first (paperback) ed.). Oxford University Press. pp. 487–533. ISBN 978-0199277186.
- Thompson, J. A. (1980). A Book of Jeremiah. The New International Commentary on the Old Testament (illustrated, revised ed.). Wm. B. Eerdmans Publishing. ISBN 9780802825308.
- Würthwein, Ernst (1995). The Text of the Old Testament. Translated by Rhodes, Erroll F. Grand Rapids, MI: Wm. B. Eerdmans. ISBN 0-8028-0788-7.
