= Ezekiel 25 =

Book of Ezekiel, chapter 25

- ← chapter 24 chapter 26 →
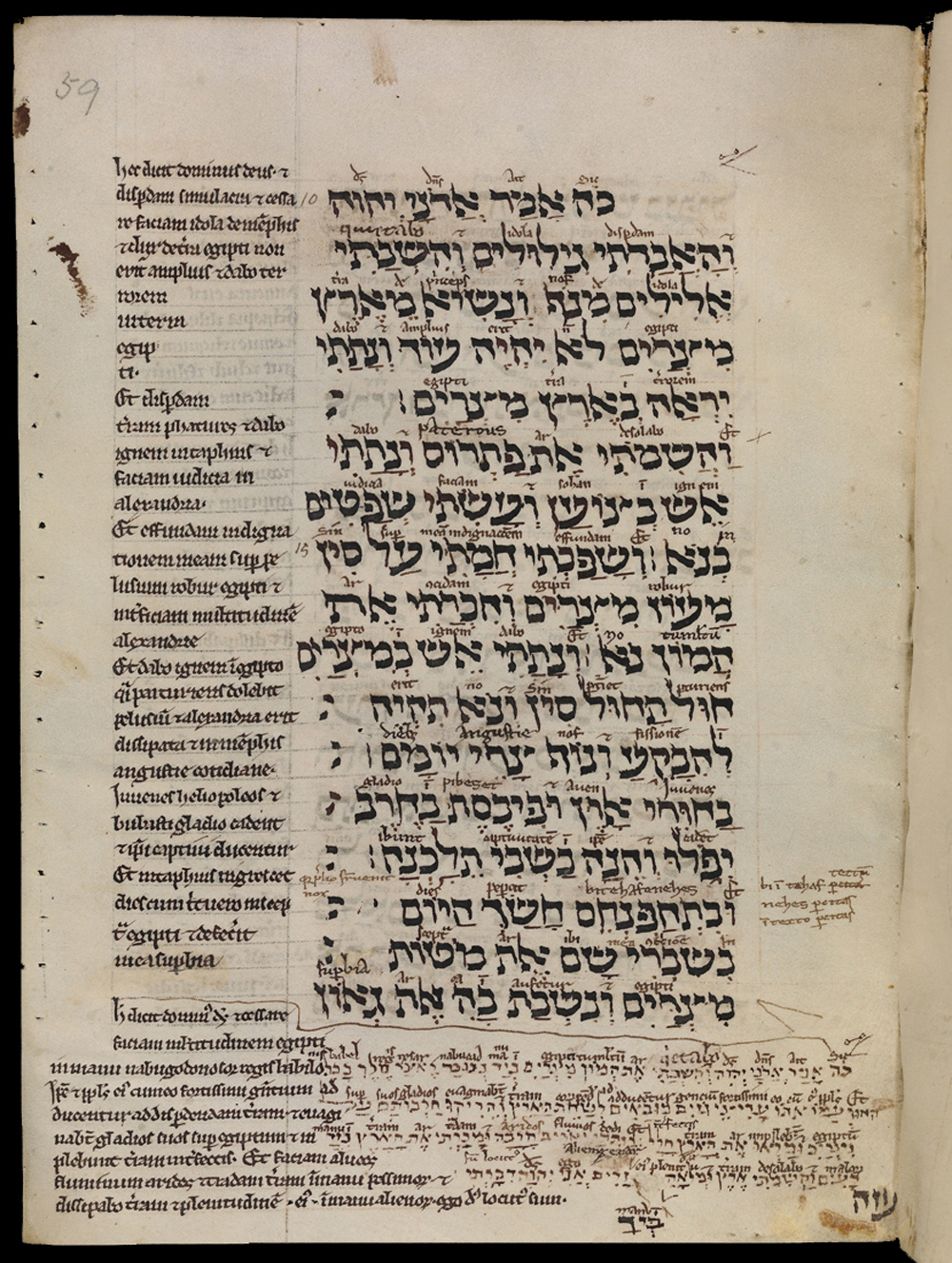
- Book of Ezekiel 30:13–18 in an English manuscript from early 13th century, MS. Bodl. Or. 62, fol. 59a. A Latin translation appears in the margins with further interlineations above the Hebrew.
- Book: Book of Ezekiel
- Hebrew Bible part: Nevi'im
- Order in the Hebrew part: 7
- Category: Latter Prophets
- Christian Bible part: Old Testament
- Order in the Christian part: 26

Ezekiel 25 is the twenty-fifth chapter of the Book of Ezekiel in the Hebrew Bible or the Old Testament of the Christian Bible. This book contains the prophecies attributed to the prophet/priest Ezekiel, and is one of the Books of the Prophets. This chapter contains the oracles against four nations: Ammon, Moab, Edom, and Philistia. The prophecies of God's vengeance against these and other foreign nations are recorded in other books of the prophets such as Isaiah (cf. Isaiah 13-23), Jeremiah (cf. Jeremiah 46-51) and Amos (cf. Amos 1-2).

== Text ==
The original text of this chapter was written in the Hebrew language. This chapter is divided into 17 verses.

Kingdoms around Israel and Judah, showing Ammon, Moab, Edom, and Philistia ("Philistine states").

=== Textual witnesses ===
Some early manuscripts containing the text of this chapter in Hebrew are of the Masoretic Text tradition, which includes the Codex Cairensis (895), the Petersburg Codex of the Prophets (916), Aleppo Codex (10th century), Codex Leningradensis (1008).

There is also a translation into Koine Greek known as the Septuagint, made in the last few centuries BC. Extant ancient manuscripts of the Septuagint version include Codex Vaticanus (B; $\mathfrak{G}$^{B}; 4th century), Codex Alexandrinus (A; $\mathfrak{G}$^{A}; 5th century) and Codex Marchalianus (Q; $\mathfrak{G}$^{Q}; 6th century). (Note: Ezekiel is missing from the extant Codex Sinaiticus.)

== Against Ammon (25:1-7) ==
The Ammonites were punished for gloating "maliciously" when Judah fell (Lamentations 2:15–16), and the land would be occupied by nomadic Arab tribes ("sons of the east" or "people of the east" in Ezekiel 25:4; cf. Isaiah 11:14). This is the longest oracle and the only one spoken in the second person form among the other prophecies in this chapter (cf. Ezekiel 21:28–29 or 21:33-34 in Hebrew texts.

=== Verse 2 ===
"Son of man, set your face against the Ammonites,

and prophesy against them." (NKJV)

Cross reference: Ezekiel 21:28; Amos 1:13–15; Jeremiah 49:1–6

- "Son of man" (Hebrew: בן־אדם, ben adam): this phrase is used 93 times to address Ezekiel.

There are two parts to the oracle against Ammon: verses 3-5 and 6–7, both for the malicious glee when the temple in Jerusalem was destroyed and when the people of Judah went into exile.

== Against Moab (25:8-11) ==
Moab is punished for gloating and stating that Judah is "like all other nations" (Ezekiel 25:8), which is considered an insult to Yahweh (cf. Ezekiel 36:20). Therefore, similar to Ammon, the land of Moab would be given to the "people of the east" (cf. Jeremiah 48).

== Against Edom (25:12-14) ==
Edom's punishment is harsh and may be singled out for betraying the agreement with Judah to fight against Babylon (Jeremiah 27:3; committing "grievous offense" in Ezekiel 25:12), but instead became a Babylonian ally, taking Judean lands in the Negeb (cf. Jeremiah 49:7–22, Obadiah 1–14).

== Against Philistia (25:15-17) ==
The Philistines (in the land of Philistia) are said to have come originally from the islands of the Aegean Sea, including Crete (cf. 1 Samuel 30:14; Amos 9:7; Zephaniah 2:5; Jeremiah 47:4), so they are called Cherethites (interpreted as Cretans). They are punished because of their vicious treatment against Judah (cf. Jeremiah 47).

=== Verse 17 ===
I will execute great vengeance upon them with furious rebukes. And they shall know that I am the Lord when I lay My vengeance upon them.

In the 1994 film Pulp Fiction, character Jules Winnfield ritually recites what is stated as Ezekiel 25:17 before he executes someone. The passage is heard three times during the film. The final two sentences of Jules' speech are similar to the actual cited passage, which is based on the King James Version, but the first two are fabricated from various biblical phrases. The primary inspiration for the speech was the work of Japanese martial arts star Sonny Chiba, particularly in the film Karate Kiba (The Bodyguard; 1976). In the 1980s television series Kage no Gundan (Shadow Warriors), Chiba's character would lecture the villain-of-the-week about how the world must be rid of evil before killing him. A killer delivers a similar biblical rant in Modesty Blaise, a 1965 novel which is shown in two scenes of Pulp Fiction.

== See also ==
- Ammon
- Baal Meon
- Cherethites
- Dedan
- Edom
- Israel
- Judah
- Kirjathaim
- Moab
- Philistines
- Rabbah
- Seir
- Teman
- Related Bible parts: Isaiah 16, Jeremiah 47, Jeremiah 48, Jeremiah 49, Ezekiel 21

== Sources ==
- Bromiley, Geoffrey W. (1995). International Standard Bible Encyclopedia: vol. iv, Q-Z. Eerdmans. ISBN 9780802837844.
- Clements, Ronald E (1996). Ezekiel. Westminster John Knox Press. ISBN 9780664252724.
- Conard, Mark T. (2006). "Symbolism, Meaning, and Nihilism in Pulp Fiction", in The Philosophy of Film Noir, ed. Mark T. Conard (Lexington: University Press of Kentucky). ISBN 0-8131-2377-1
- Coogan, Michael David (2007). Coogan, Michael David; Brettler, Marc Zvi; Newsom, Carol Ann; Perkins, Pheme (eds.). The New Oxford Annotated Bible with the Apocryphal/Deuterocanonical Books: New Revised Standard Version, Issue 48 (Augmented 3rd ed.). Oxford University Press. ISBN 9780195288810.
- Galambush, J. (2007). "25. Ezekiel". In Barton, John; Muddiman, John (eds.). The Oxford Bible Commentary (first (paperback) ed.). Oxford University Press. pp. 533–562. ISBN 978-0199277186.
- Joyce, Paul M. (2009). Ezekiel: A Commentary. Continuum. ISBN 9780567483614.
- Reinhartz, Adele (2003). Scripture on the Silver Screen (Louisville, Ky.: Westminster John Knox Press). ISBN 0-664-22359-1
- Thomas, Brian (2003). VideoHound's Dragon: Asian Action & Cult Flicks (Canton, Mich.: Visible Ink Press). ISBN 1-57859-141-4
- Würthwein, Ernst (1995). The Text of the Old Testament. Translated by Rhodes, Erroll F. Grand Rapids, MI: Wm. B. Eerdmans. ISBN 0-8028-0788-7.
