= Isaiah 15 =

Book of Isaiah, chapter 15

- ← chapter 14 chapter 16 →
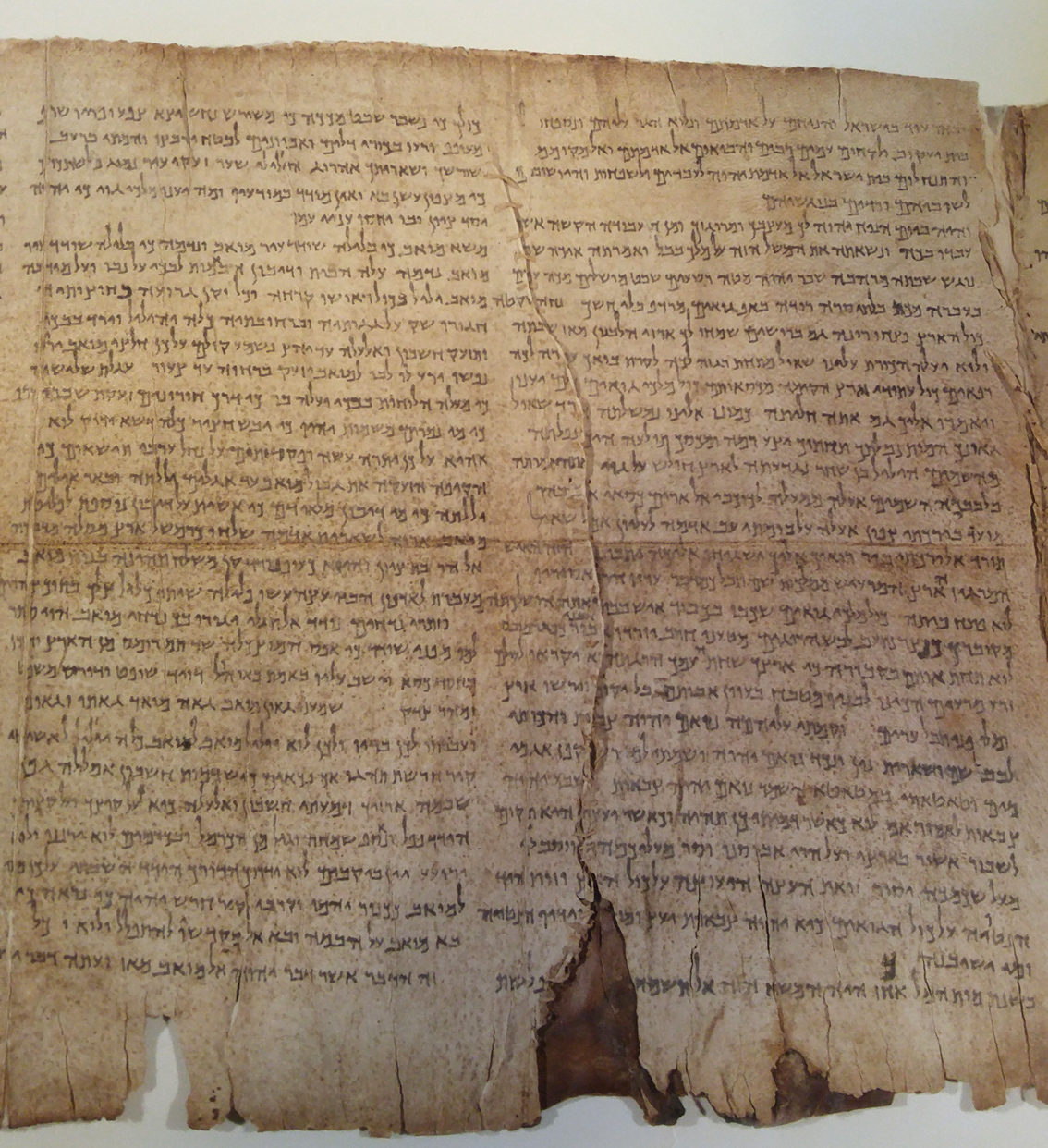
- Photo of Great Isaiah Scroll facsimile, showing columns 12-13 (Isaiah 14:1-16:14).
- Book: Book of Isaiah
- Hebrew Bible part: Nevi'im
- Order in the Hebrew part: 5
- Category: Latter Prophets
- Christian Bible part: Old Testament
- Order in the Christian part: 23

Isaiah 15 is the fifteenth chapter of the Book of Isaiah in the Hebrew Bible or the Old Testament of the Christian Bible. This book contains the prophecies attributed to the prophet Isaiah, and is one of the Books of the Prophets. This chapter and the following chapter deal with the forthcoming history of Moab.

== Text ==
The original text was written in Hebrew language. This chapter is divided into 9 verses.

=== Textual witnesses ===
Some early manuscripts containing the text of this chapter in Hebrew are of the Masoretic Text tradition, which includes the Codex Cairensis (895), the Petersburg Codex of the Prophets (916), Aleppo Codex (10th century), Codex Leningradensis (1008).

Fragments containing parts of this chapter were found among the Dead Sea Scrolls (3rd century BCE or later):

- 1QIsa^{a}: complete
- 1QIsa^{b}: extant verses 2-9
- 4QIsa^{o} (4Q68): extant verse 1

Extant ancient manuscripts of a translation into Koine Greek known as the Septuagint, made in the last few centuries BCE, include Codex Vaticanus (B; $\mathfrak{G}$^{B}; 4th century), Codex Sinaiticus (S; BHK: $\mathfrak{G}$^{S}; 4th century), Codex Alexandrinus (A; $\mathfrak{G}$^{A}; 5th century) and Codex Marchalianus (Q; $\mathfrak{G}$^{Q}; 6th century).

== Parashot ==
The parashah sections listed here are based on the Aleppo Codex. Isaiah 15 is a part of the Prophecies about the Nations (Isaiah 13–23). {P}: open parashah; {S}: closed parashah.

{P} 15:1-9 [16:1-4 {S}]

== Verse 1 ==
The burden against Moab.

Because in the night Ar of Moab is laid waste

And destroyed,

Because in the night Kir of Moab is laid waste

And destroyed,

- "Burden" (Hebrew: מַשָּׂ֖א mashā): the keyword in the superscriptions for a total of nine similar oracles; the others being: Isaiah 13:1; 17:1; 19:1; 21:1, 11, 13; 22:1; 23:1.

== Verse 5 ==
My heart will cry out for Moab

Isaiah records his sympathy with Moab.

== See also ==
- Ar-Moab
- Ascent of Luhith
- Beer Elim
- Dibon
- Dimon
- Eglaim
- Elealeh
- Heshbon
- Horonaim
- Jahaz
- Kir-Moab
- Medeba
- Moab
- Nebo
- Nimrim
- Zoar
- Related Bible parts: 2 Kings 3, 2 Kings 13, Isaiah 13, Isaiah 14, Isaiah 16, Isaiah 25, Jeremiah 48, Ezekiel 25

== Sources ==
- Childs, Brevard S. (2001). Isaiah. Westminster John Knox Press. ISBN 9780664221430.
- Ulrich, Eugene, ed. (2010). The Biblical Qumran Scrolls: Transcriptions and Textual Variants. Brill.
- Würthwein, Ernst (1995). The Text of the Old Testament. Translated by Rhodes, Erroll F. Grand Rapids, MI: Wm. B. Eerdmans. ISBN 0-8028-0788-7.
