= Jeremiah 50 =

Book of Jeremiah, chapter 50

- ← chapter 49 chapter 51 →
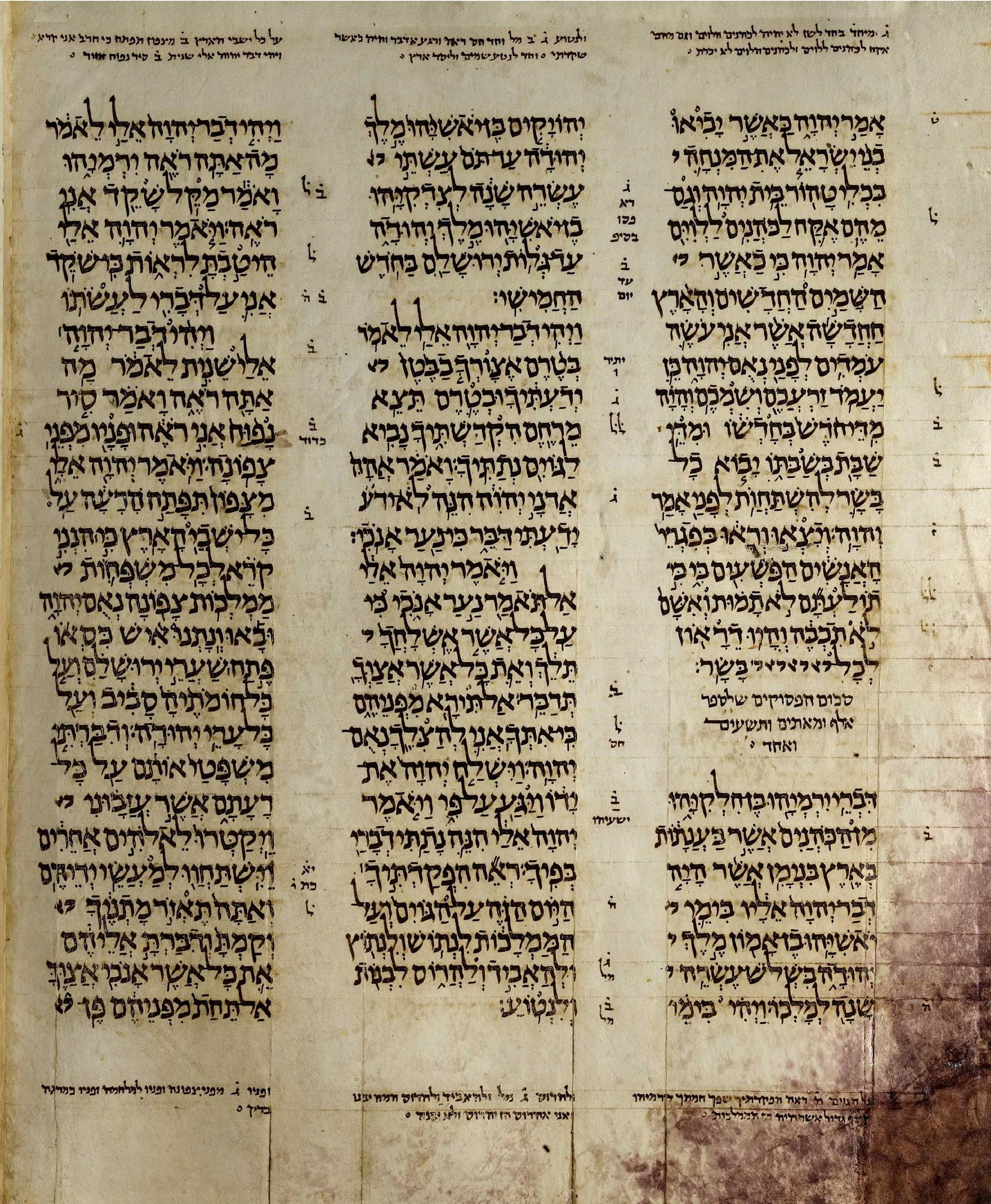
- A high resolution scan of the Aleppo Codex showing the Book of Jeremiah (the sixth book in Nevi'im).
- Book: Book of Jeremiah
- Hebrew Bible part: Nevi'im
- Order in the Hebrew part: 6
- Category: Latter Prophets
- Christian Bible part: Old Testament
- Order in the Christian part: 24

Jeremiah 50 is the fiftieth chapter of the Book of Jeremiah in the Hebrew Bible or the Old Testament of the Christian Bible. This book contains prophecies attributed to the prophet Jeremiah, and is one of the Books of the Prophets. This chapter is part of a series of "oracles against foreign nations", consisting of chapters 46 to 51. Chapters 50 and 51 focus on Babylon. The New American Bible (Revised Edition) denotes chapter 50 as "the first oracle against Babylon" and chapter 51 as "the second oracle". An unnamed "enemy from the North" is predicted to reduce imperial Babylon "to a wasteland".

== Text ==
The original text was written in Hebrew. This chapter is divided into 46 verses.

=== Textual witnesses ===
Some early manuscripts containing the text of this chapter in Hebrew are of the Masoretic Text tradition, which includes the Codex Cairensis (895), the Petersburg Codex of the Prophets (916), Aleppo Codex (10th century), Codex Leningradensis (1008). Some fragments containing parts of this chapter were found among the Dead Sea Scrolls, i.e., 4QJer^{e} (4Q72b; mid 2nd century BCE), with extant verses 4-6

There is also a translation into Koine Greek known as the Septuagint (with a different chapter and verse numbering), made in the last few centuries BCE. Extant ancient manuscripts of the Septuagint version include Codex Vaticanus (B; $\mathfrak{G}$^{B}; 4th century), Codex Sinaiticus (S; BHK: $\mathfrak{G}$^{S}; 4th century), Codex Alexandrinus (A; $\mathfrak{G}$^{A}; 5th century) and Codex Marchalianus (Q; $\mathfrak{G}$^{Q}; 6th century).

=== Verse numbering ===
The order of chapters and verses of the Book of Jeremiah in the English Bibles, Masoretic Text (Hebrew), and Vulgate (Latin), in some places differs from that in the Septuagint (LXX, the Greek Bible used in the Eastern Orthodox Church and others) according to Rahlfs or Brenton. The following table is taken with minor adjustments from Brenton's Septuagint, page 971.

The order of Computer Assisted Tools for Septuagint/Scriptural Study (CATSS) based on Alfred Rahlfs' Septuaginta (1935) differs in some details from Joseph Ziegler's critical edition (1957) in Göttingen LXX. Swete's Introduction mostly agrees with Rahlfs' edition (=CATSS).

Hebrew, Vulgate, English	Rahlfs' LXX (CATSS)
50:1-46	27:1-46
43:1-13	50:1-13

== Parashot ==
The parashah sections listed here are based on the Aleppo Codex. Jeremiah 50 is a part of the prophecies "Against Babylon" in the section of Prophecies against the nations (Jeremiah 46-51). {P}: open parashah; {S}: closed parashah.

{P} 50:1-7 {S} 50:8-16 {S} 50:17 {P} 50:18-20 {P} 50:21 {S} 50:22-27 {S} 50:28-30 {P} 50:31-32 {S} 50:33-46 {S}

== Verse 1 ==
The word that the Lord spoke against Babylon and against the land of the Chaldeans by Jeremiah the prophet.

- "By Jeremiah the prophet": lit. "by the hand of Jeremiah the prophet" (cf. Haggai 1:1; Malachi 1:1; contrast to Jeremiah 46:1; 49:34).

== Verse 3 ==
For out of the north a nation comes up against her [Babylon],
Which shall make her land desolate,
And no one shall dwell therein.
They shall move, they shall depart,
Both man and beast.

"They shall move" may alternatively read as "they shall wander". It is "characteristic of Jeremiah" that threatened calamity should come from the north: "first the Scythians and then the Babylonians, whereas the Persians are here meant", or the Medes. See, for example, Jeremiah 1:14, 4:6, 6:1, 6:22, 10:22, 13:20 and 46:20.

== See also ==
- Babylon
- Bel
- Chaldea
- Merathaim
- Merodach
- Zion
- Related Bible part: Ezekiel 27

== Sources ==
- Coogan, Michael David (2007). Coogan, Michael David; Brettler, Marc Zvi; Newsom, Carol Ann; Perkins, Pheme (eds.). The New Oxford Annotated Bible with the Apocryphal/Deuterocanonical Books: New Revised Standard Version, Issue 48 (Augmented 3rd ed.). Oxford University Press. ISBN 9780195288810.
- Huey, F. B. (1993). The New American Commentary - Jeremiah, Lamentations: An Exegetical and Theological Exposition of Holy Scripture, NIV Text. B&H Publishing Group. ISBN 9780805401165.
- O'Connor, Kathleen M. (2007). "23. Jeremiah". In Barton, John; Muddiman, John (eds.). The Oxford Bible Commentary (first (paperback) ed.). Oxford University Press. pp. 487–533. ISBN 978-0199277186.
- Thompson, J. A. (1980). A Book of Jeremiah. The New International Commentary on the Old Testament (illustrated, revised ed.). Wm. B. Eerdmans Publishing. ISBN 9780802825308.
- Würthwein, Ernst (1995). The Text of the Old Testament. Translated by Rhodes, Erroll F. Grand Rapids, MI: Wm. B. Eerdmans. ISBN 0-8028-0788-7.
