= Sodomy =

Anal or oral sex with people, any sex with an animal, non-procreative sex

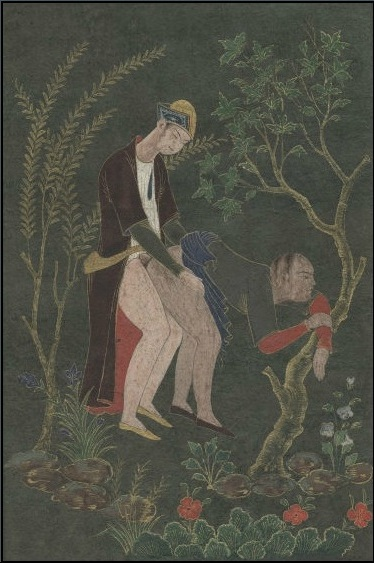
Men engaging in anal sex, Persian Safavid painting

Sodomy (/ˈsɒd.ə.mi/), also called buggery in British English, principally refers to either anal sex (but occasionally also oral sex) between people, or any sexual activity between a human and another animal (bestiality). It may also mean any non-procreative sexual activity (including manual sex). Originally the term sodomy, which is derived from the story of Sodom and Gomorrah in the Book of Genesis, was commonly restricted to homosexual anal sex. Sodomy laws in many countries criminalized the behavior. In the Western world, many of these laws have been overturned or are routinely not enforced. A person who practices sodomy is sometimes referred to as a sodomite, a pejorative term.

== Terminology ==
The term is derived from the Ecclesiastical Latin peccatum Sodomiticum, "sin of Sodom", which in turn comes from the Ancient Greek word Σόδομα (Sódoma). Genesis (chapters 18–20) tells how God destroyed the sinful cities of Sodom and Gomorrah. Two angels sent to the cities are invited by Lot to take refuge with his family for the night. The men of Sodom surround Lot's house and demand that he bring out the strangers so that they may "know" them (a euphemism for sexual intercourse). Lot protests that the messengers are his guests and offers the Sodomites his virgin daughters instead, but then they threaten to "do worse" with Lot than they would with his guests. Then the angels strike the Sodomites blind, "so that they wearied themselves to find the door". (Genesis 19:4–11, KJV)

=== In modern English ===
In current usage the term is particularly used in law. Laws prohibiting sodomy were seen frequently in past Jewish, Christian, and Islamic civilizations, but the term has little modern usage outside Africa, Asia, and the United States.

These laws in the United States have been challenged and have sometimes been found unconstitutional or been replaced with different legislation.

The word sod, a noun or verb (to "sod off") used as an insult, is derived from sodomite. It is a general-purpose insult term for anyone the speaker dislikes without specific reference to their sexual behaviour. Sod is used as slang in the United Kingdom and the Commonwealth and is considered mildly offensive. (The word 'sod' also has a meaning of "(clump of) earth" with an unrelated etymology, in which sense it is rare but not offensive.)

=== Cognates in other languages ===
Many cognates in other languages, such as French sodomie (verb sodomiser), Spanish sodomía (verb sodomizar) and Portuguese sodomia (verb sodomizar), have been used exclusively for penetrative anal sex since at least the early 19th century. In those languages the term is also often current vernacular (not just legal, unlike in other cultures) and a formal way of referring to any practice of anal penetration; the word sex is commonly associated with consent and pleasure with regard to all involved parties and often avoids directly mentioning two common aspects of social taboo – human sexuality and the anus – without a shunning or archaic connotation to its use.

In modern German the word Sodomie has no connotation of anal or oral sex and specifically refers to bestiality. The same goes for the Polish sodomia. The Norwegian word sodomi carries both senses. In Danish, sodomi is rendered as "unnatural carnal knowledge with someone of the same sex or (now) with animals".

In Arabic and Persian, the word for sodomy, لواط (Arabic pronunciation: liwāṭ; Persian pronunciation lavât), is derived from the same source as in Western culture, with much the same connotations as English (referring to most sexual acts prohibited by the Qur'an). Its direct reference is to Lot (لوط Lūṭ in Arabic) and a more literal interpretation of the word is "the practice of Lot", but more accurately it means "the practice of Lot's people" (the Sodomites) rather than Lot himself.

=== Religious and legal interpretation ===
While religion and the law have had a fundamental role in the historical definition and punishment of sodomy, sodomitical texts present considerable opportunities for ambiguity and interpretation. Sodomy is both a real occurrence and an imagined category. In the course of the eighteenth century, what is identifiable as sodomy often becomes identified with effeminacy, for example, or in opposition to a discourse of manliness.

In this regard Ian McCormick has argued that

an adequate and imaginative reading involves a series of intertextual interventions in which histories become stories, fabrications and reconstructions in lively debate with, and around, 'dominant' heterosexualities ... Deconstructing what we think we see may well involve reconstructing ourselves in surprising and unanticipated ways.

=== Buggery ===
The modern English word "bugger" is derived from the French term bougre, which evolved from the Latin Bulgarus or "Bulgarian". The word was used to describe members of the Bogomils, a heretical sect originating in 10th century Bulgaria, as well as the related French Albigenses.

The first use of the word buggery appears in Middle English in 1330, where it is associated with "abominable heresy", though the sexual sense of "bugger" is not recorded until 1555. The Oxford Dictionary of English Etymology quotes a similar form: "bowgard" (and "bouguer") but claims that the Bulgarians were heretics "as belonging to the Greek Church, sp. Albigensian". Webster's Third New International Dictionary gives the only meaning of the word "bugger" as a sodomite "from the adherence of the Bulgarians to the Eastern Church considered heretical".

Bugger is still commonly used in modern British English as an exclamation, while "buggery" is synonymous with the act of sodomy.

== History ==
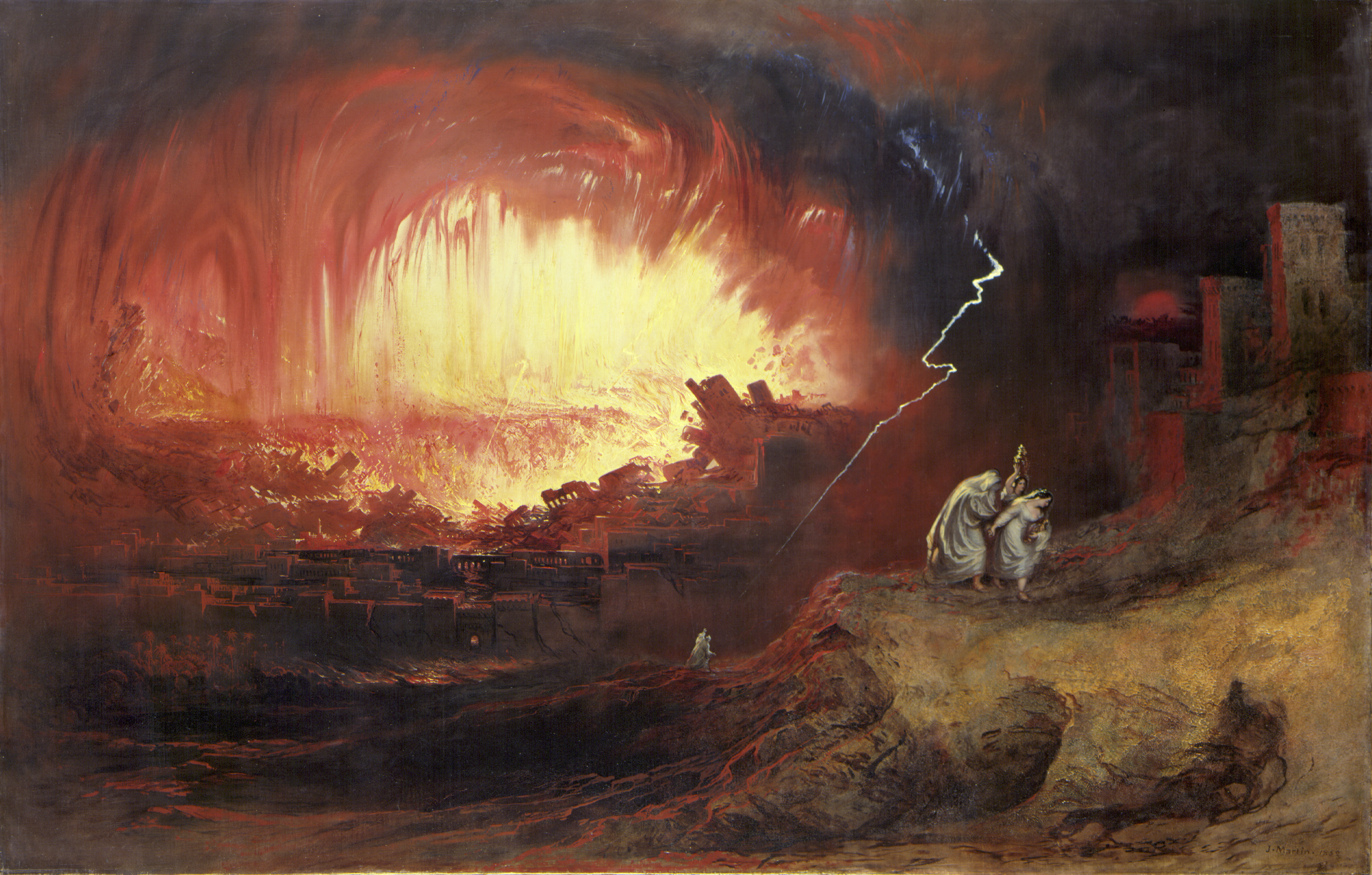
The Destruction of Sodom and Gomorrah, John Martin, 1852

=== Hebrew Bible ===
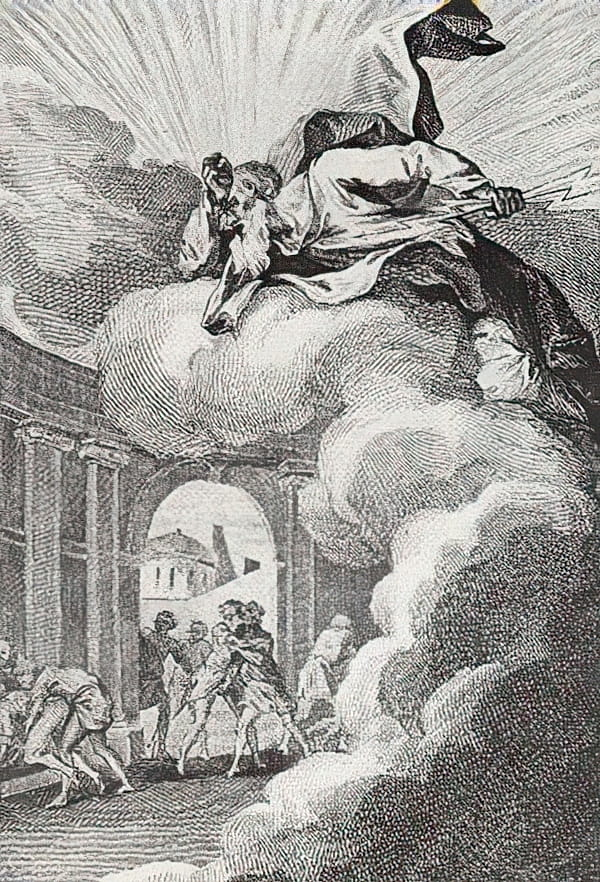
François Elluin, Sodomites provoking the wrath of God, from Le Pot-Pourri de Loth, 1781

In the Hebrew Bible, Sodom was a city destroyed by God because of the evil of its inhabitants. No specific sin is given as the reason for God's great wrath. The story of Sodom's destruction – and of Abraham's failed attempt to intercede with God and prevent that destruction – appears in Genesis 18–19. The connection between Sodom and homosexuality is derived from the described attempt by a mob of the city's people to rape Lot's male guests. Some suggest the sinfulness for which Sodom was destroyed might have consisted mainly in the violation of obligations of hospitality, which were important for the original writers of the Biblical account. In Judges 19–21, there is an account, similar in many ways, where Gibeah, a city of the Benjamin tribe, is destroyed by the other tribes of Israel in revenge for a mob of its inhabitants raping and killing a woman.

Many times in the Pentateuch and Prophets, writers use God's destruction of Sodom to demonstrate His awesome power. This happens in Deuteronomy 29; Isaiah 1, 3, and 13; Jeremiah 49 and 50; Lamentations 4; Amos 4.11; and Zephaniah 2.9. Deuteronomy 32, Jeremiah 23.14, and Lamentations 4 reference the sinfulness of Sodom, but do not specify any particular sin.

Specific sins which Sodom is linked to by the prophets of the Hebrew Bible are adultery and lying (Jeremiah 23:14).

In Ezekiel 16, a long comparison is made between Sodom and the kingdom of Judah: "Yet you have not merely walked in their ways or done according to their abominations; but, as if that were too little, you acted more corruptly in all your conduct than they." (v. 47, NASB) "Behold, this was the guilt of your sister Sodom: she and her daughters had arrogance, abundant food and careless ease, but she did not help the poor and needy. Thus they were haughty and committed abominations before Me." (vss. 49–50, NASB) (The Hebrew for the word "thus" is the conjunction "ו" which is usually translated "and", therefore KJV, NIV, and CEV omit the word entirely.)

There is no explicit mention of any sexual sin in Ezekiel's summation and "abomination" is used to describe many sins.

The Authorized King James Version translates Deuteronomy 23:17 as: "There shall be no whore of the daughters of Israel, nor a sodomite of the sons of Israel," but the word corresponding to "sodomite" in the Hebrew original, Qadesh (Hebrew:קדש), does not refer to Sodom, and has been translated in the New International Version as "shrine prostitute"; male shrine prostitutes may have served barren women in fertility rites rather than engaging in homosexual acts; this also applies to other instances of the word sodomite in the King James Version.

The Book of Wisdom, which is included in the Biblical canon by Orthodox and Catholic Christians, makes reference to the story of Sodom, further emphasizing that their sin had been failing to practice hospitality:

And punishments came upon the sinners not without former signs by the force of thunders: for they suffered justly according to their own wickedness, insomuch as they used a more hard and hateful behavior toward strangers.

For the Sodomites did not receive those, whom they knew not when they came: but these brought friends into bondage, that had well deserved of them. (KJV)

=== Philo ===
The Hellenistic Jewish philosopher, Philo (20 BCE – 50 CE), described the inhabitants of Sodom in an extra-biblical account:

As men, being unable to bear discreetly a satiety of these things, get restive like cattle, and become stiff-necked, and discard the laws of nature, pursuing a great and intemperate indulgence of gluttony, and drinking, and unlawful connections; for not only did they go mad after other women, and defile the marriage bed of others, but also those who were men lusted after one another, doing unseemly things, and not regarding or respecting their common nature, and though eager for children, they were convicted by having only an abortive offspring; but the conviction produced no advantage, since they were overcome by violent desire; and so by degrees, the men became accustomed to be treated like women, and in this way engendered among themselves the disease of females, and intolerable evil; for they not only, as to effeminacy and delicacy, became like women in their persons, but they also made their souls most ignoble, corrupting in this way the whole race of men, as far as depended on them.

— 133–35; ET Jonge 422–23

=== New Testament ===
The New Testament, like the Old Testament, refers to Sodom as a place where God's anger against sin was displayed, but the Epistle of Jude provides a certain class of sin as causing its destruction, the meaning of which is disputed.

I will therefore put you in remembrance, though ye once knew this, how that the Lord, having saved the people out of the land of Egypt, afterward destroyed them that believed not. And the angels which kept not their first estate, but left their own habitation, he hath reserved in everlasting chains under darkness unto the judgment of the great day. Even as Sodom and Gomorrha, and the cities about them in like manner, giving themselves over to fornication, and going after strange flesh, are set forth for an example, suffering the vengeance of eternal fire.

— Jude 1:5 KJV
Compare Jude 1:7 in multiple versions

The Greek word in the New Testament from which the phrase is translated "giving themselves over to fornication" is ekporneuō (ek and porneuō). As one word it is not used elsewhere in the New Testament but occurs in the Septuagint to denote whoredom (Genesis 38:24 and Exodus 34:15). Some modern translations such as the NIV render it as "sexual immorality".

The Greek words for "strange flesh" are heteros, which almost always basically denotes "another/other", and sarx, a common word for "flesh", and usually refers to the physical body or the nature of man or of an ordinance.

In the Christian expansion of the prophets, they further linked Sodom to the sins of impenitence (Matthew 11:23), careless living (Luke 17:28), fornication (Jude 1:7 KJV), and an overall "filthy" lifestyle (2 Peter 2:7), which word (aselgeiais) elsewhere is rendered in the KJV as lasciviousness (Mark 7:22; 2 Corinthians 12:21; Ephesians 4:19; 1 Peter 4:3; Jude 1:4) or wantonness (Romans 13:13; 2 Peter 2:18).

==== Epistle of Jude ====
The Epistle of Jude in the New Testament echoes the Genesis narrative and potentially adds the sexually immoral aspects of Sodom's sins: "just as Sodom and Gomorrah and the surrounding cities, which likewise indulged in sexual immorality and pursued unnatural desire, serve as an example by undergoing a punishment of eternal fire" (v. 7, English Standard Version). The phrase rendered "sexual immorality and unnatural desire" is translated "strange flesh" or "false flesh", but it is not entirely clear what it refers to.

One theory is that it is just a reference to the "strange flesh" of the intended rape victims, who were angels, not men. Countering this is traditional interpretation, which notes that the angels were sent to investigate an ongoing regional problem (Gn. 18) of fornication, and, extraordinarily so, that of a homosexual nature, "out of the order of nature". "Strange" is understood to mean "outside the moral law", (Romans 7:3; Galatians 1:6) while it is doubted that either Lot or the men of Sodom understood that the strangers were angels at the time.

=== Josephus ===
The Jewish historian Josephus used the term "Sodomites" in summarizing the Genesis narrative: "About this time the Sodomites grew proud, on account of their riches and great wealth; they became unjust towards men, and impious towards God, in so much that they did not call to mind the advantages they received from him: they hated strangers, and abused themselves with Sodomitical practices" "Now when the Sodomites saw the young men to be of beautiful countenances, and this to an extraordinary degree, and that they took up their lodgings with Lot, they resolved themselves to enjoy these beautiful boys by force and violence; and when Lot exhorted them to sobriety, and not to offer anything immodest to the strangers, but to have regard to their lodging in his house; and promised that if their inclinations could not be governed, he would expose his daughters to their lust, instead of these strangers; neither thus were they made ashamed." (Antiquities 1.11.1,3 – c. 96CE). His assessment goes beyond the Biblical data, though it is seen by conservatives as defining what manner of fornication (Jude 1:7) Sodom was given to.

=== Medieval Christendom ===
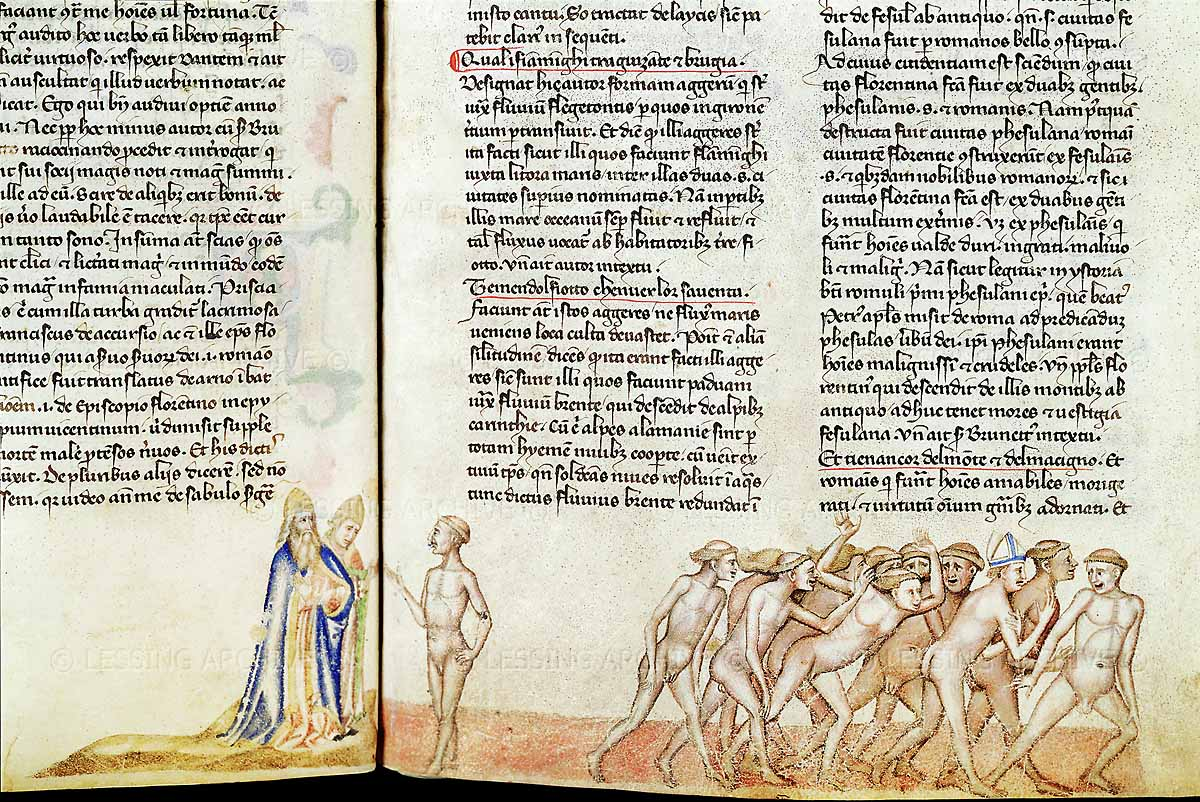
Dante and Virgil interview the sodomites, from Guido da Pisa's commentary on the Commedia, c. 1345

Homosexual intercourse between males was possibly denounced in pre-6th century Jewish and Christian writings, such as the Epistle to the Romans and John Chrysostom's fourth homily on Romans and attributed to Sodom by the Jewish philosopher Philo (20 BCE – 50 CE) and the Christian bishop Methodius of Olympus (260–311) and possible by Flavius Josephus (37–100) Augustine of Hippo, (354–430) and some pseudepigraphacal texts. The first attested applications of the word "sodomy" to male homosexual intercourse were Emperor Justinian I's amendments to his Corpus iuris civilis; novels no. 77 (dating 538) and no. 141 (dating 559) declared that Sodom's sin had been specifically same-sex activities and desire for them. He also linked "famines, earthquakes, and pestilences" upon cities as being due to "such crimes," during a time of recent earthquakes and other disasters (see Extreme weather events of 535–536). While adhering to the death penalty by beheading as punishment for homosexuality or adultery, Justinian's legal novels heralded a change in Roman legal paradigm in that he introduced a concept of not only secular but also divine punishment for homosexual behavior.

Justinian's usage of the term was taken up around 850 CE by the Pseudo-Isidorian fabrications. Three Carolingian capitularies, fabricated under the pseudonym Benedictus Levita, referred to sodomy:

- XXI. De diversis malorum flagitiis. ("No. 21: On manifold disgraceful wrongs")
- CXLIII. De sceleribus nefandis ob quae regna percussa sunt, ut penitus caveantur. ("No. 143: On sinful vices due to which empires have crumbled, so that we shall do our best to beware of them")
- CLX. De patratoribus diversorum malorum. ("No. 160: On the perpetrators of manifold evil deeds")

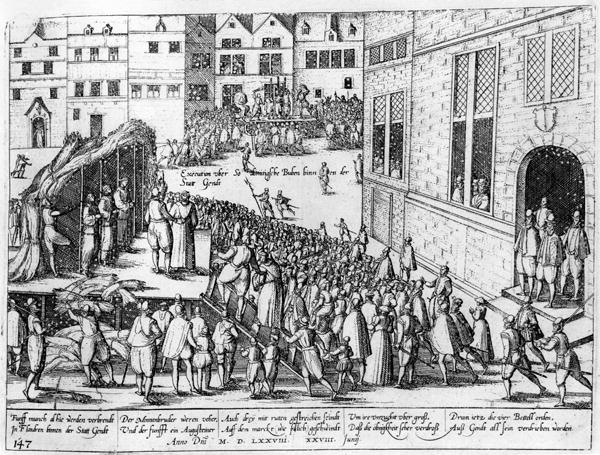
Monks accused of sodomy burned at the stake, Ghent 1578

Benedictus Levita broadened the meaning for sodomy to all sexual acts not related to procreation that were therefore deemed counter nature (so for instance, even solitary masturbation and anal intercourse between a male and a female were covered), while among these, he still emphasized all interpersonal acts not taking place between human men and women, especially homosexuality.

Benedictus Levita prescribed capital punishment for sodomy. Burning had been part of the standard penalty for homosexual behavior, particularly common in Germanic protohistory (as according to Germanic folklore, sexual deviance and especially same-sex desire were caused by a form of malevolence or spiritual evil called nith, rendering those people characterized by it as non-human fiends, as nithings). Benedictus Levita's rationale was that the punishment of such acts was to protect all Christendom from divine punishments, such as natural disasters for carnal sins committed by individuals, but also for heresy, superstition, and paganism. Because his crucial demands for capital punishment had been so unheard of in ecclesiastical history previously, based upon the humane Christian concept of forgiveness and mercy, it took several centuries before Benedictus Levita's demands for legal reform began to take tangible shape within larger ecclesiastical initiatives.

During the Medieval Inquisition, sects like the Cathars and Waldensians were not only persecuted for their heterodox beliefs, but were increasingly accused of fornication and sodomy. In 1307, accusations of sodomy and homosexuality were major charges levelled during the Trial of the Knights Templar. Some of these charges were specifically directed at the Grand Master of the order, Jacques de Molay. The Adamites were a libertine sect also accused of sodomy.

The early-modern witch hunts were also largely connoted with sodomy.

Persecution of Cathars and the Bogomiles in Bulgaria led to the use of a term closely related to sodomy: buggery derives from French bouggerie, meaning "of Bulgaria". The association of sodomy with hereticism, satanism, and witchcraft was supported by the Inquisition trials.

=== Sodomy laws in 18th-century Europe ===
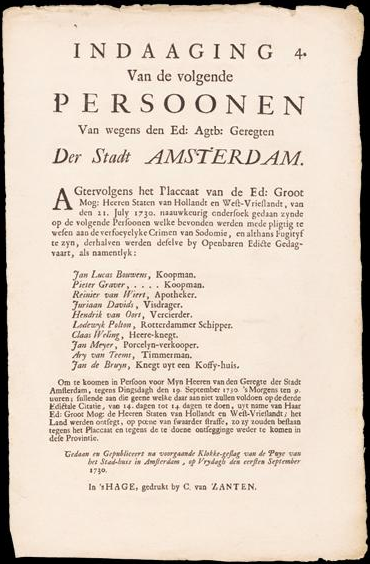
A wanted poster, published in the city of Amsterdam in 1730, accusing ten men of "the abominable crime of sodomy" (de verfoeyelyke Crimen van Sodomie)

An examination of trials for rape and sodomy during the 18th century at the Old Bailey in London shows that the treatment of rape was often lenient, while the treatment of sodomy was often severe. However, the difficulty of proving that penetration and ejaculation had occurred meant that men were often convicted of the lesser charge of "assault with sodomitical intent", which was not a capital offence. Sodomy crimes in England could mean "sexually assaulting a young child", and could result in a sentence of death recorded, i.e., not an actual death sentence at all.

In 18th century France sodomy was still theoretically a capital crime, and there are a handful of cases where sodomites were executed. However in several of these other crimes were involved as well. Records from the Bastille and the police lieutenant d'Argenson, as well as other sources, show that many who were arrested were exiled, sent to a regiment, or imprisoned in places (generally the hospital) associated with moral crimes (such as prostitution). Of these, a number were involved in prostitution or had approached children or otherwise gone beyond merely having homosexual relations. Ravaisson (a 19th-century writer who edited the Bastille records) suggested that the authorities preferred to handle these cases discreetly, lest public punishments in effect publicize "this vice".

Periodicals of the time sometimes casually named known sodomites, and at one point even suggested that sodomy was increasingly popular. This does not imply that sodomites necessarily lived in security – specific police agents, for instance, watched the Tuileries, even then a known "cruising area". But, as with much sexual behaviour under the Old Regime, discretion was a key concern on all sides (especially since members of prominent families were sometimes implicated); the law seemed most concerned with those who were the least discreet.

In 1730 there was a wave of sodomy trials in the Netherlands: some 250 men were summoned before the authorities; 91 faced decrees of exile for not appearing. At least 60 men were sentenced to death.

The last two Englishmen hanged for sodomy were executed in 1835. James Pratt and John Smith died in front of Newgate Prison in London on 27 November 1835 or 8 April 1835. They had been prosecuted under the Offences against the Person Act 1828, which had replaced the 1533 Buggery Act.

== Modern sodomy laws ==
Laws criminalizing sodomy rarely spell out precise sexual acts but are typically understood by courts to include any sexual act deemed to be unnatural or immoral. Sodomy typically includes anal sex, oral sex and bestiality. In practice, sodomy laws have rarely been enforced against heterosexual couples, and have mostly been used to target homosexuals.

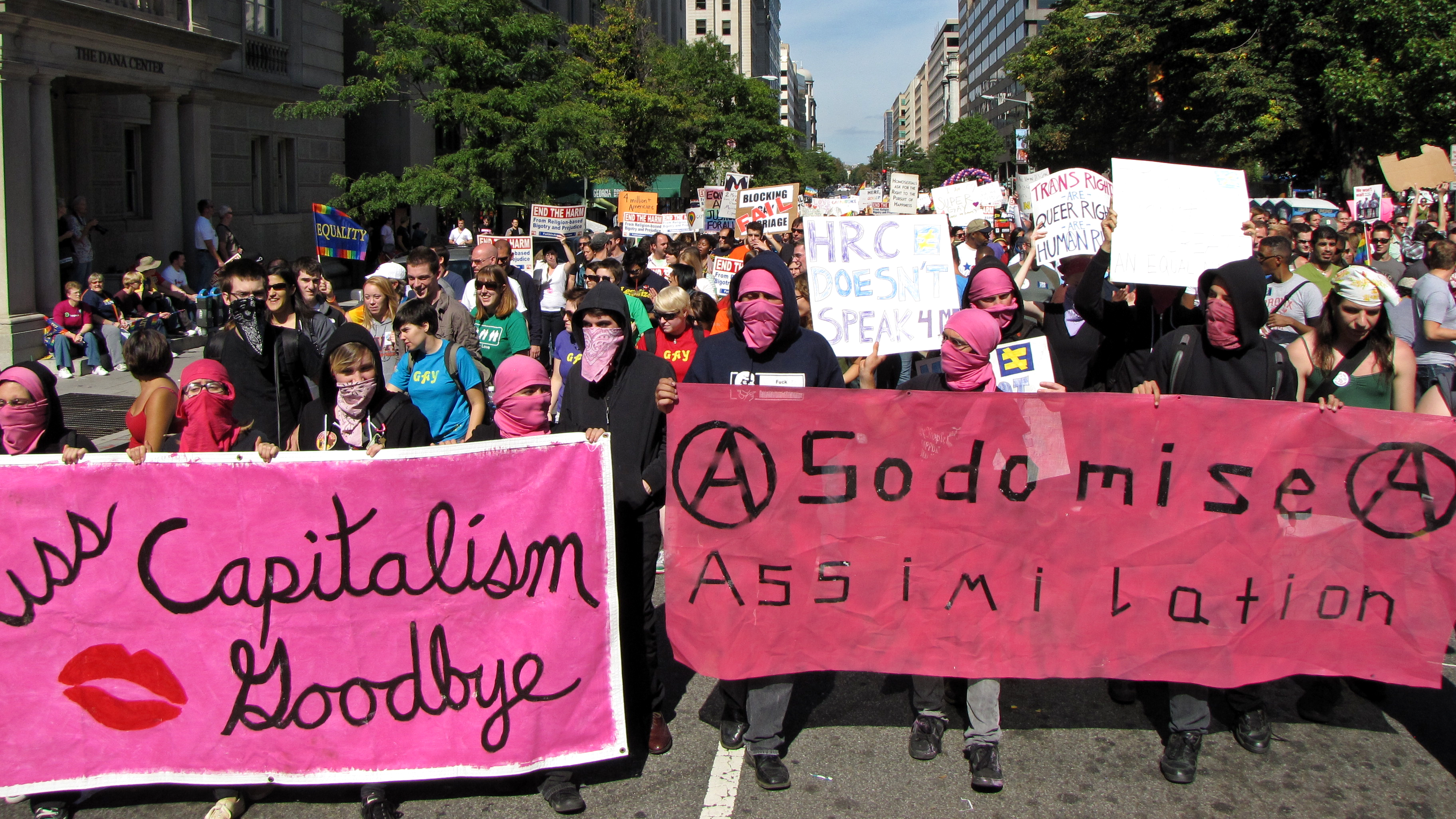
Queer anarchists protesting against homophobia, with a banner reading "Sodomize Assimilation", on 11 October 2009 in Washington DC

As of February 2024, 66 countries as well as three sub-national jurisdictions (Note: These sub-national jurisdictions are: the province of Aceh (Indonesia), Gaza (Palestine) and Chechnya (Russia).) have laws criminalizing homosexuality. In 2006 that number was 92. Of these 66 countries, 44 of them criminalize not only male homosexuality but also female homosexuality. In 11 of them homosexuality is punished with the death penalty.

== Abrahamic religions ==
Abrahamic religions (namely Judaism, Samaritanism, Christianity, the Baháʼí Faith, and Islam) have traditionally affirmed and endorsed a patriarchal and heteronormative approach towards human sexuality, favouring exclusively penetrative vaginal intercourse between men and women within the boundaries of marriage over all other forms of human sexual activity. At various times, acts including autoeroticism, masturbation, oral sex, manual sex, non-penetrative and non-heterosexual sexual intercourse have been labeled as "sodomy", believing and teaching that such behaviors are forbidden because they are considered sinful, and further compared to or derived from the behavior of the alleged residents of Sodom and Gomorrah. However, the status of LGBT people in early Christianity and early Islam is debated.

=== Judaism ===
Behold, this was the iniquity of thy sister Sodom, pride, fullness of bread, and abundance of idleness was in her and in her daughters, neither did she strengthen the hand of the poor and needy. And they were haughty, and committed abomination before me: therefore I took them away as I saw good.

— Ezekiel 16:49–50 (KJV)

Classical Jewish texts are seen by many as not stressing the homosexual aspect of the attitude of the inhabitants of Sodom as much as their cruelty and lack of hospitality to the "stranger". The 13th-century Jewish scholar, Nachmanides, wrote: "According to our sages, they were notorious for every evil, but their fate was sealed for their persistence in not supporting the poor and the needy." His contemporary, Rabbenu Yonah, expresses the same view: "Scripture attributes their annihilation to their failure to practice tzedakah [charity or justice]." Prohibitions on same-sex activities among men (#157) and bestiality (#155–156) are among the 613 commandments as listed by Maimonides in the 12th century; however, their source in Leviticus 18 does not contain the word sodomy. The idea that homosexual intercourse was involved as at least a part of the evil of Sodom arises from the story in Genesis 19 (KJV):

And they called unto Lot, and said unto him, Where are the men which came in to thee this night? bring them out unto us, that we may know them.

— Genesis 19:4–7 (KJV)

The verb "know" is understood to be a euphemism for sex (see discussion in the section below), which some translations (e.g. the New International Version) make more explicit.

=== Christianity ===
The traditional interpretation sees the primary sin of Sodom as being homosexual intercourse, connecting the Sodom narrative with Leviticus 18, which lists various sexual crimes that according to verses 27 and 28 would result in the land being "defiled":

for the inhabitants of the land, who were before you, committed all of these abominations, and the land became defiled; otherwise the land will vomit you out for defiling it, as it vomited out the nation that was before you.

Some scholars, such as Per-Axel Sverker, align this passage with the traditional interpretation, claiming that the word "abomination" refers to sexual misconduct, and that while homosexual acts were not the only reason Sodom and Gomorrah were condemned it was a significant part of the picture.

Others, the earliest of whom was Derrick Sherwin Bailey, claim that this passage contradicts the traditional interpretation altogether. In their view, the sins of Sodom were related more to violation of hospitality laws than sexual sins. This also coincides with traditional Jewish interpretations of these texts.

The primary word in contention is the Hebrew word yada, used for know in the Hebrew Bible. Biblical scholars disagree on what "know" in this instance refers to, but most of conservative Christianity interprets it to mean "sexual intercourse", while the opposing position interprets it to mean "interrogate". Lot's offering of his two virgins has been interpreted to mean that Lot is offering a compromise to assure the crowd that the two men have no untoward intentions in town, or that he is offering his virgins as a substitute for the men to "know" by sexual intercourse.

Those who oppose the interpretation of sexual intent toward Lot's guests point out that there are over 930 occurrences of the Hebrew word (yâda‛) for "know" in the Hebrew Bible, and its use to denote sexual intercourse only occurs about a dozen times, and in the Septuagint it is not rendered sexually. Countering this is the argument that most of the uses of yâda‛ denoting sex is in Genesis (including once for premarital sex: Genesis 38:26), and in verse 8, sex is the obvious meaning. Its use in the parallel story in Judges 19 is also invoked in support of this meaning, with it otherwise providing the only instance of "knowing" someone by violence.

Thomas Aquinas gave a definition of the word "sodomy" in his Summa Theologica. He wrote:

by copulation with an undue sex, male with male, or female with female, as the Apostle states (Romans 1:27): and this is called the "vice of sodomy".

=== Islam ===
While the Quran clearly disapproves of the sexual practices of the "people of Lot" ("What, of all creatures do ye come unto the males, and leave the wives your Lord created for you?"), only one passage has occasionally been interpreted as taking a particular legal position towards such activities:

And as for those who are guilty of an indecency from among your women, call to witnesses against them four (witnesses) from among you; then if they bear witness confine them to the houses until death takes them away or Allah opens some way for them (15). And as for the two who are guilty of indecency from among you, give them both a punishment; then if they repent and amend, turn aside from them; surely Allah is oft-returning (to mercy), the Merciful. (16)^{[4:15–16 (Translated by Shakir)]}

Most exegetes hold that these verses refer to illicit heterosexual relationships, although a minority view attributed to the Mu'tazilite scholar, Abu Muslim al-Isfahani, interpreted them as referring to homosexual relations. This view was widely rejected by medieval scholars, but has found some acceptance in modern times.

Hadith (reports of Muhammad's sayings and deeds from those close to him in his lifetime) on the subject are inconsistent, with different writers interpreting the Prophet in different ways. Shariah (Islamic law) defines sodomy outside marriage as adultery or fornication or both, and it thus attracts the same penalties as those crimes (flogging or death), although the exact punishment varies with schools and scholars. In practice, few modern Muslim countries have legal systems based fully on Shariah, and an increasing number of Muslims do not look to shariah but to the Quran itself for moral guidance. For sodomy within marriage, the majority of Shiite interpreters hold that: (1) anal intercourse, while strongly disliked, is not haram (forbidden) provided the wife agrees; and (2) if the wife does not agree, then it is preferable to refrain.

Despite the formal disapproval of religious authority, gender segregation in Muslim societies and the strong emphasis on virility leads some adolescents and unmarried young men to seek alternative sexual outlets to women, especially with males younger than themselves. Not all sodomy is homosexual – for some young men, heterosexual sodomy is considered better than vaginal penetration, and female prostitutes report demand for anal penetration from their male clients.

== See also ==
- Ayoni
- The Bible and homosexuality
- Female sodomy
- Homosexuality and Christianity
- Prison rape
- Religion and sexuality
