= Nimrim =

Nimrim, in Moab, is mentioned twice in scripture in the Tanakh and Bible, in Isaiah 15:6 and in Jeremiah 48:34.

Little is known of Nimrim other than it was in Moab. It is mentioned in connection with several cities that were under Moabite control at that time (around 626BC - 586BC) such as Heshbon, Zoar and Horonaim. Scholars are not in agreement of whether Nimrim was a river, or a lake, or a city.

== See also ==
- Isaiah 15

== Resources ==
- Matthew Poole Commentary Vol. 2 page 629, ISBN 978-0-917006-28-9
