= Isaiah 16 =

Book of Isaiah, chapter 16

- ← chapter 15 chapter 17 →
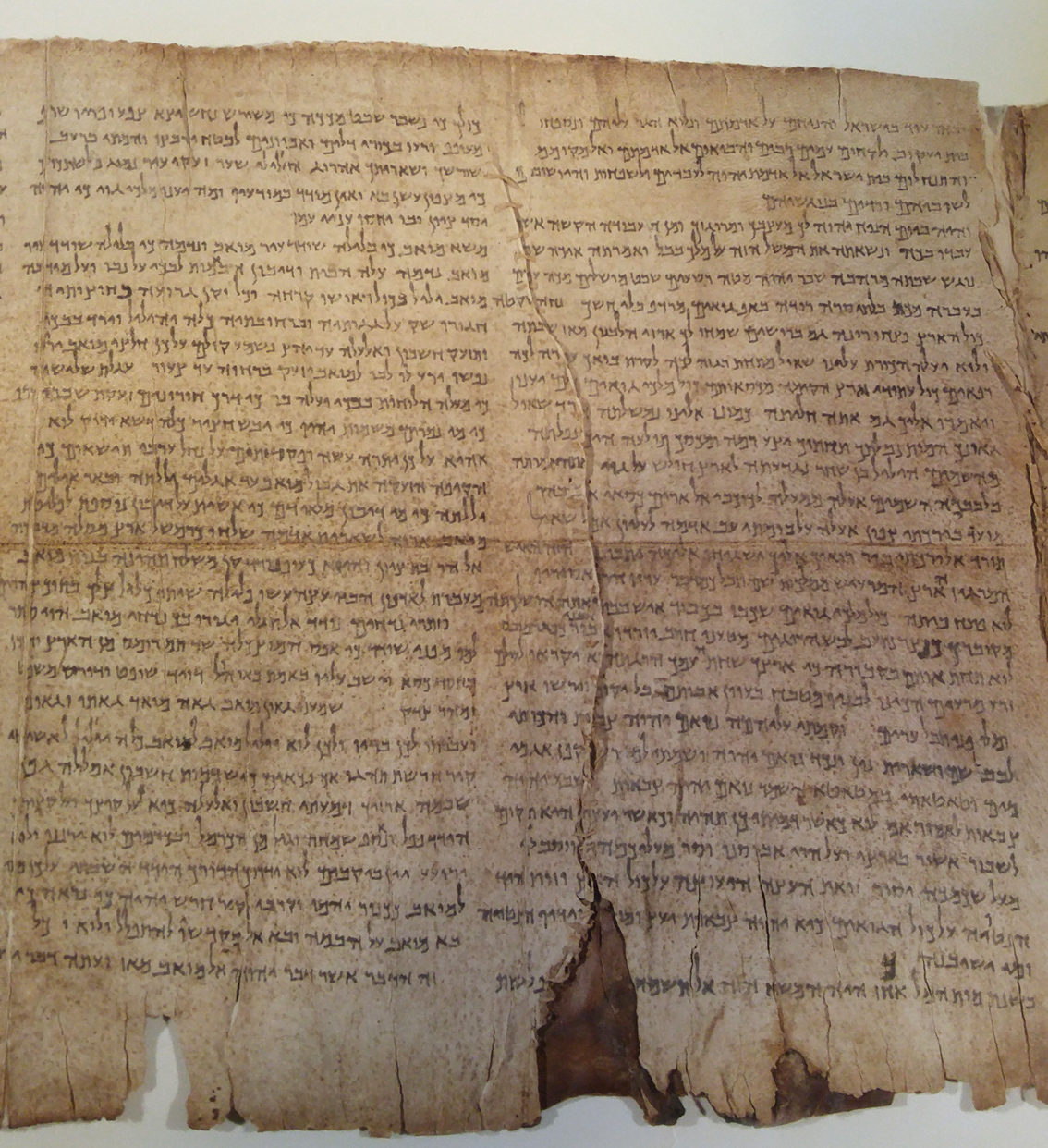
- Photo of Great Isaiah Scroll facsimile, showing columns 12-13 (Isaiah 14:1-16:14).
- Book: Book of Isaiah
- Hebrew Bible part: Nevi'im
- Order in the Hebrew part: 5
- Category: Latter Prophets
- Christian Bible part: Old Testament
- Order in the Christian part: 23

Isaiah 16 is the sixteenth chapter of the Book of Isaiah in the Hebrew Bible or the Old Testament of the Christian Bible. This book contains the prophecies attributed to the prophet Isaiah, and is one of the Books of the Prophets. This chapter continues the proclamation concerning Moab commenced in the previous chapter.

== Text ==
The original text was written in Hebrew language. This chapter is divided into 14 verses.

=== Textual witnesses ===
Some early manuscripts containing the text of this chapter in Hebrew are of the Masoretic Text tradition, which includes the Codex Cairensis (895), the Petersburg Codex of the Prophets (916), Aleppo Codex (10th century), Codex Leningradensis (1008).

Fragments containing parts of this chapter were found among the Dead Sea Scrolls (3rd century BCE or later):

- 1QIsa^{a}: complete
- 1QIsa^{b}: extant verses 2-9
- 4QIsa^{o} (4Q68): extant verse 1

Extant ancient manuscripts of a translation into Koine Greek known as the Septuagint, made in the last few centuries BCE, include Codex Vaticanus (B; $\mathfrak{G}$^{B}; 4th century), Codex Sinaiticus (S; BHK: $\mathfrak{G}$^{S}; 4th century), Codex Alexandrinus (A; $\mathfrak{G}$^{A}; 5th century) and Codex Marchalianus (Q; $\mathfrak{G}$^{Q}; 6th century).

== Parashot ==
The parashah sections listed here are based on the Aleppo Codex. Isaiah 16 is a part of the Prophecies about the Nations (Isaiah 13–23). {P}: open parashah; {S}: closed parashah.

[{P} 15:1-9] 16:1-4 {S} 16:5-12 {S} 16:13-14 {P}

== Verse 1 ==
There are varied translations of the opening words of this chapter:

Send the lamb to the ruler of the land
Send lambs as tribute to the ruler of the land
Send lambs to the king of the country
I will send forth the son of the ruler of the land
The people of Moab send a lamb as a present to the one who rules in Jerusalem

2 Kings 3:4 states that:

Mesha king of Moab was a sheepbreeder, and he regularly paid the king of Israel one hundred thousand lambs and the wool of one hundred thousand rams. But it happened, when Ahab died, that the king of Moab rebelled against the king of Israel.

== Verse 14 ==
But now the Lord has spoken, saying,

“Within three years, as the years of a hired man, the glory of Moab will be despised with all that great multitude, and the remnant will be very small and feeble.”

"Within three years" may refer to the attack of Sargon II "in 715 BC" to put down a rebellion in Moab.

== See also ==
- Arnon
- David
- Elealeh
- Heshbon
- Moab
- Jazer
- Kir Hareseth
- Kir Heres
- Sela
- Sibmah
- Zion
- Related Bible parts: 2 Kings 3, 2 Kings 13, Isaiah 13, Isaiah 14, Isaiah 15, Isaiah 25, Ezekiel 25

== Bibliography ==
- Ulrich, Eugene, ed. (2010). The Biblical Qumran Scrolls: Transcriptions and Textual Variants. Brill.
- Würthwein, Ernst (1995). The Text of the Old Testament. Translated by Rhodes, Erroll F. Grand Rapids, MI: Wm. B. Eerdmans. ISBN 0-8028-0788-7.
