= Kir of Moab =

Biblical stronghold

Kir of Moab is mentioned in the Hebrew Bible as one of the two main strongholds of Moab, the other being Ar. It is probably the same as the city called Kir-haresh (Isaiah 16:11, KJV), Kir-hareseth (Hebrew: קִיר-חֲרֶשֶׂת; Isa 16:7), and Kir-heres (Hebrew: קִיר חָרֶשׂ; Isa 16:11; Jer 48:31, 48:36). The word Kir alludes to a wall or fortress. By the 5th century BC, the city name had been adapted to the common language of the time, Aramaic, becoming Karak in Moab, and later the Roman and Byzantine periods, Charachmoba (H. E. Mayer pp. 119-120). The Arabic name until today is al-Karak.

According to the second Book of Kings, after the death of Ahab, king of Israel, Mesha, the king of Moab (see Mesha Stele), threw off the allegiance to the king of Israel. Ahab's successor, Jehoram, in seeking to regain his supremacy over Moab, entered into an alliance with Jehoshaphat of Judah and with the king of Edom. The three kings led their armies against Mesha, who was driven back to seek refuge in Kir-haraseth. When the situation became desperate for the Moabites, Mesha took his eldest son, who would have inherited his crown, and sacrificed him as a burnt-offering on the wall of the fortress in full sight of the besieging armies. "There was great indignation against Israel: and they departed from him, and returned to their own land(s)." The invaders evacuated from the land of Moab, and Mesha achieved the independence of his country (2 Kings 3:20-3:27). Josephus explained the withdrawal with the pity the kings felt with the Moabite monarch who had felt compelled to offer up his own son.

== Kir of the Arameans ==
Kir is also the name of another place in the Hebrew Bible, to which Tiglath-Pileser carried the Aramean captives after he had taken the city of Damascus (2 Kings 16:9; Amos 1:5). It is also the location from which the Arameans are said to have originated from 9:7). Isaiah 22:6 mentions it along with Elam. Some scholars have supposed that Kir is a variant of Cush (Susiana), on the south of Elam.

== See also ==
- Isaiah 15, prophecy against Kir and Moab
