= Ezekiel 26 =

Book of Ezekiel, chapter 26

- ← chapter 25 chapter 27 →
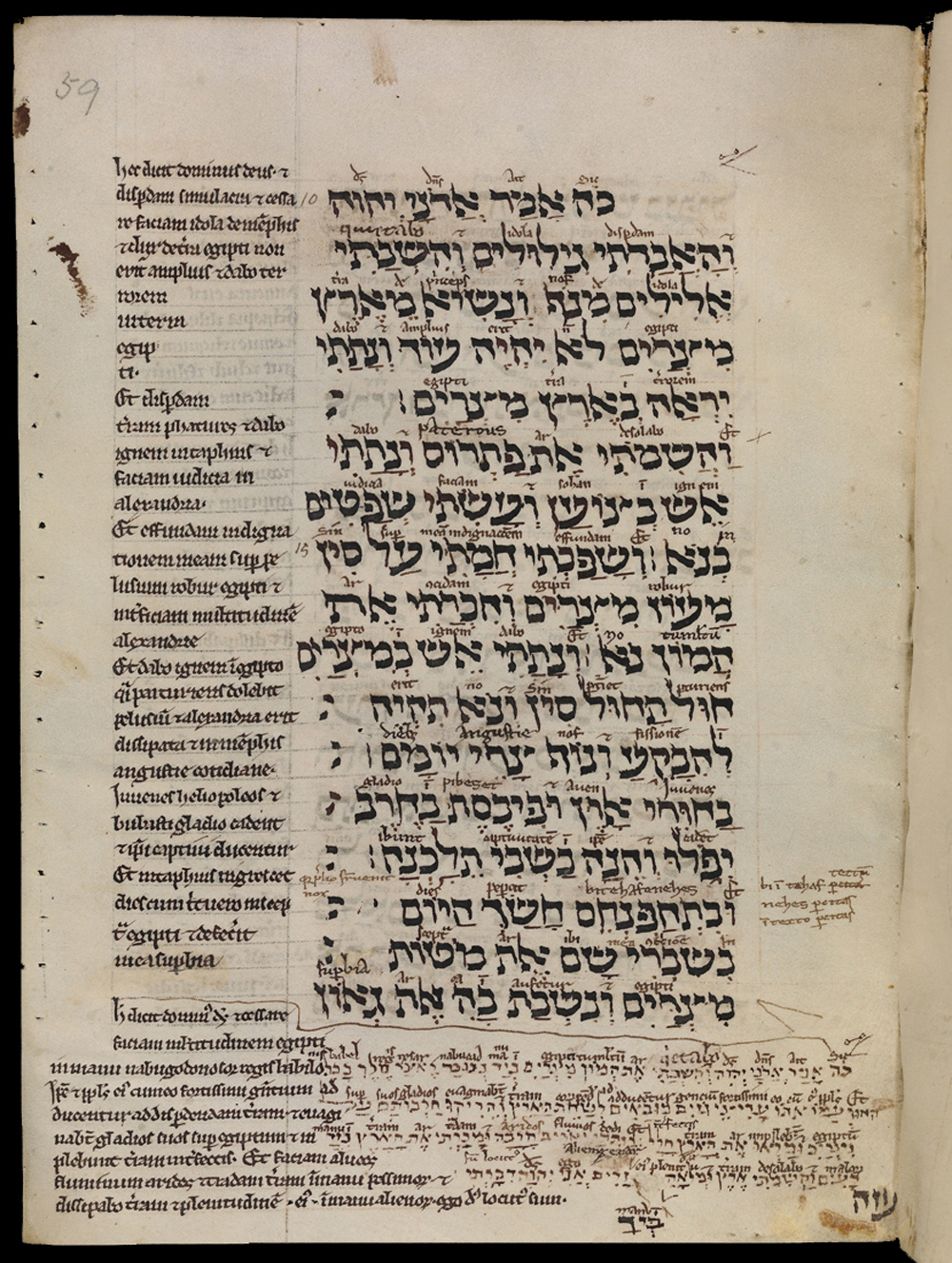
- Book of Ezekiel 30:13–18 in an English manuscript from the early 13th century, MS. Bodl. Or. 62, fol. 59a. A Latin translation appears in the margins with further interlineations above the Hebrew.
- Book: Book of Ezekiel
- Hebrew Bible part: Nevi'im
- Order in the Hebrew part: 7
- Category: Latter Prophets
- Christian Bible part: Old Testament
- Order in the Christian part: 26

Ezekiel 26 is the twenty-sixth chapter of the Book of Ezekiel in the Hebrew Bible or the Old Testament of the Christian Bible. This book contains the prophecies attributed to the prophet/priest Ezekiel, and is one of the Books of the Prophets.

This chapter contains a "Proclamation against Tyre".

== Text ==
The original text was written in the Hebrew language. This chapter is divided into 21 verses.

=== Textual witnesses ===
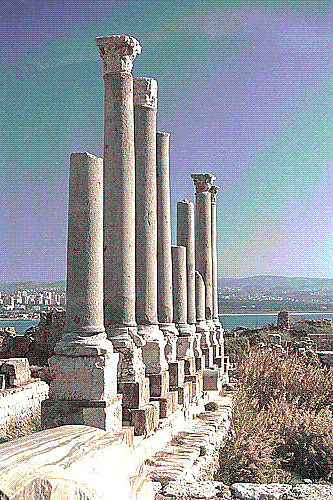
The ruins of Tyre

Some early manuscripts containing the text of this chapter in Hebrew are of the Masoretic Text tradition, which includes the Codex Cairensis (895), the Petersburg Codex of the Prophets (916), Aleppo Codex (10th century), Codex Leningradensis (1008).

There is also a translation into Koine Greek known as the Septuagint, made in the last few centuries BC. Extant ancient manuscripts of the Septuagint version include Codex Vaticanus (B; $\mathfrak{G}$^{B}; 4th century), Codex Alexandrinus (A; $\mathfrak{G}$^{A}; 5th century) and Codex Marchalianus (Q; $\mathfrak{G}$^{Q}; 6th century). (Note: Ezekiel is missing from the extant Codex Sinaiticus.)

== Verse 1 ==
And it came to pass in the eleventh year, on the first day of the month, that the word of the Lord came to me, saying,

The date corresponds to the year 586 or 585 BCE based on the analysis by German theologian Bernhard Lang.

A marginal note in the Masoretic Text tradition indicates that this is the middle verse of the Book of Ezekiel in Hebrew.

== Verse 2 ==
"Son of man, because Tyre has said against Jerusalem, 'Aha! She is broken who was the gateway of the peoples; now she is turned over to me; I shall be filled; she is laid waste.'"

- "Son of man" (Hebrew: בן־אדם ḇen-’ā-ḏām): this phrase is used 93 times to address Ezekiel.
- "Aha" (Hebrew: הֶאָ֔ח, he-’āḥ) is an interjection to express joy or "satisfaction over the misfortune of an enemy or rival" as in Isaiah 44:16, Psalm 35:21, 25, and Psalm 40:16, rendered "Good!" in the Holman Christian Standard Bible. Ezekiel 25:3 similarly reports that the Ammonites said "Aha!" over God's sanctuary in Jerusalem when it was profaned.
- Tyre, a Phoenician major seaport and leading city, received judgment for gloating when Jerusalem fell. Chapters 27 and 28 also lament the fall of Tyre.

== Verses 17-18 ==
And they will take up a lamentation for you, and say to you:

“How you have perished,
O one inhabited by seafaring men,
O renowned city,
Who was strong at sea,
She and her inhabitants,
Who caused their terror to be on all her inhabitants!
Now the coastlands tremble on the day of your fall;
Yes, the coastlands by the sea are troubled at your departure.”

A qinah or lamentation.

== Verse 21 ==
"I will make you a terror, and you shall be no more; though you are sought for, you will never be found again", says the Lord God.

Protestant theologian Heinrich Ewald translates, "To sudden death will I bring thee", which corresponds with the margin of the Revised Version, I will make thee a destruction.

== See also ==
- Babylon
- Jerusalem
- Nebuchadnezzar
- Tyre
- Related Bible parts: Psalm 35, Psalm 40, Isaiah 23, Isaiah 44, Ezekiel 25

== Bibliography ==
- Bromiley, Geoffrey W. (1995). International Standard Bible Encyclopedia: vol. iv, Q-Z. Eerdmans. ISBN 9780802837844.
- Brown, Francis; Briggs, Charles A.; Driver, S. R. (1994). The Brown-Driver-Briggs Hebrew and English Lexicon (reprint ed.). Hendrickson Publishers. ISBN 978-1565632066.
- Clements, Ronald E (1996). Ezekiel. Westminster John Knox Press. ISBN 9780664252724.
- Gesenius, H. W. F. (1979). Gesenius' Hebrew and Chaldee Lexicon to the Old Testament Scriptures: Numerically Coded to Strong's Exhaustive Concordance, with an English Index. Translated by Tregelles, Samuel Prideaux (7th ed.). Baker Book House.
- Joyce, Paul M. (2009). Ezekiel: A Commentary. Continuum. ISBN 9780567483614.
- Kee, Howard Clark; Meyers, Eric M.; Rogerson, John; Levine, Amy-Jill; Saldarini, Anthony J. (2008). Chilton, Bruce (ed.). The Cambridge Companion to the Bible (2, revised ed.). Cambridge University Press. ISBN 9780521691406.
- Würthwein, Ernst (1995). The Text of the Old Testament. Translated by Rhodes, Erroll F. Grand Rapids, MI: Wm. B. Eerdmans. ISBN 0-8028-0788-7.
