= Ar (city) =

Ar is mentioned in the Hebrew Bible several times as a city of ancient Moab (Numbers 21:15). While the exact location is unknown, it is likely to have been in the southern part of the Arnon Valley, which is the present day Wadi Mujib gorge in Jordan. The city was one of Moab's most prominent, being listed by the prophet Isaiah in his denunciation of the Moabite nation (Isaiah 15:1). Matthew Poole suggested that "the city was seated in an island in the middle of the river".

The Bible speaks of Ar as being captured by the Amorite King Sihon (Numbers 21:28).

Modern scholars believe that the word "Ar" likely meant "city".

== See also ==
- Isaiah 15, prophecy against Ar and Moab
