= Wells in the Bible =

For reasons of climate in ancient Israel, references to water wells in the Bible are numerous and often significant.

== River water sources ==
The River Litani and the River Jordan are the only rivers of any size in the vicinity of the land of Canaan. Perennial brooks are very scarce and the wadis, or streambeds, while numerous and impetuous in the rainy season, are dry during the rest of the year. Job 6:16-17 compares faithless friends to these torrent-beds, swollen in the spring, but vanishing in the hot weather. Ben Sira twice enumerates water as the first among the "principal things necessary for the life of man".

== Wells ==
Many springs, wells and fountains were landmarks in the topography of the ancient near-east. Abraham dug a well near Gerar. An angel found Hagar, his concubine, at a well in the Sinai, Beer-lahai-roi. Abraham's servant, visiting Nahor to seek a wife for Isaac, waiting by a well in the evening, "the time when women go down to draw water". Edward Robinson observed in 1841 that in the evening, "now as then, women and girls are in the habit of fetching the water required for the house". Jesus, sitting on the brim of Jacob's Well, spoke with a Samaritan woman, asking her for water and promising his own "water of life".

To own a well and to possess the surrounding country were synonymous terms (Proverbs 5:15-17). On the other hand, so serious might be the disputes arising out of the use or claim of a well that the sword was appealed to as the sole arbiter (Genesis 26:21; Exodus 2:17; Numbers 20:17). If the approach of an enemy was feared, his progress might be seriously hampered, if not altogether frustrated, by stopping or destroying the wells along his route.

"Wells of water" speak of access and supply, and much more in the Bible. When Israel traveled to a place where God had miraculously provided water in the past, they sang, "Spring up, O well! All of you sing to it ..." God's people recognized that God was the One who had provided the water before, and that God would do so again.

== Springs ==
A spring is the "eye of the landscape", the natural burst of living water, flowing all year or drying up at certain seasons. In contrast to the "troubled waters" of wells and rivers (Jeremiah 2:18), there gushes forth from it "living water", to which Jesus compared the grace of the Holy Spirit (John 4:10; 7:38; compare Isaiah 12:3; 44:3).

Towns and hamlets bear names compounded with the word Ain (En), Hebrew for a well or spring. For example, Endor (spring of Dor), Engannin (spring of gardens), Engaddi (spring of the kid), Rogel or En-rogel (spring of the foot), Ensemes (spring of the sun), etc. But springs were comparatively rare; biblical language distinguishes the natural springs from the wells, which are water pits bored under the rocky surface and having no outlet. They belonged to and were named by the person who dug them. Many names of places, too, are compounded with B'er (the Hebrew word "well"), such as Bersable, Beroth, and Beer Elim.

== Cisterns ==
Cisterns are subterranean reservoirs, sometimes covering as much as an acre of land, in which the rainwater is gathered during the spring. Jerusalem was so well supplied with them that in all the sieges no one within its walls ever suffered from want of water. Cisterns were hewed into the native rock and then lined with impervious masonry and cement. Their construction involved great labour; Yahweh promised to the children of Israel, when coming out of Egypt, the possession of cisterns dug by others as a special mark of favour (Deuteronomy 6:11; 2 Esdras 9:25).

If the cement of the cistern gave way, the reservoir became useless and was abandoned. It was then one of the "broken cisterns, that could hold no water" (Jeremiah 2:13). The mouth of wells and cisterns was generally surrounded by a curb or low wall and closed with a stone, both to prevent accidents and to keep away strangers. If the owner neglected to cover the cistern, and a domestic animal fell into it, the Mosaic law obliged him to pay the price of the animal (Exodus 21:33-34; compare Luke 14:5). Sometimes the stone placed on the orifice was so heavy that one man was unable to remove it (Genesis 29:3). When dry, cisterns were used as dungeons, because, narrowed at the top, like "huge bottles", they left no avenue open for escape (Genesis 37:24; Jeremiah 38:6; 1 Maccabees 7:19). They also offered convenient places for hiding a person from his pursuers (1 Samuel 13:6; 2 Samuel 17:18).

== See also ==
- Abraham's well
