= Merathaim =

Biblical term

Merathaim is a biblical term found in Jeremiah meaning two things: double bitterness and double rebellion. Some scholars hold the idea that the dual expression is merely the intensity of the Lord while others say that it is an actual place because of the context: Attack the land of Merathaim.

According to J. Andrew Dearman, the term "Merathaim" is a sarcastic pun used as a reference to Babylon.
