= Ezekiel 27 =

Book of Ezekiel, chapter 27

- ← chapter 26 chapter 28 →
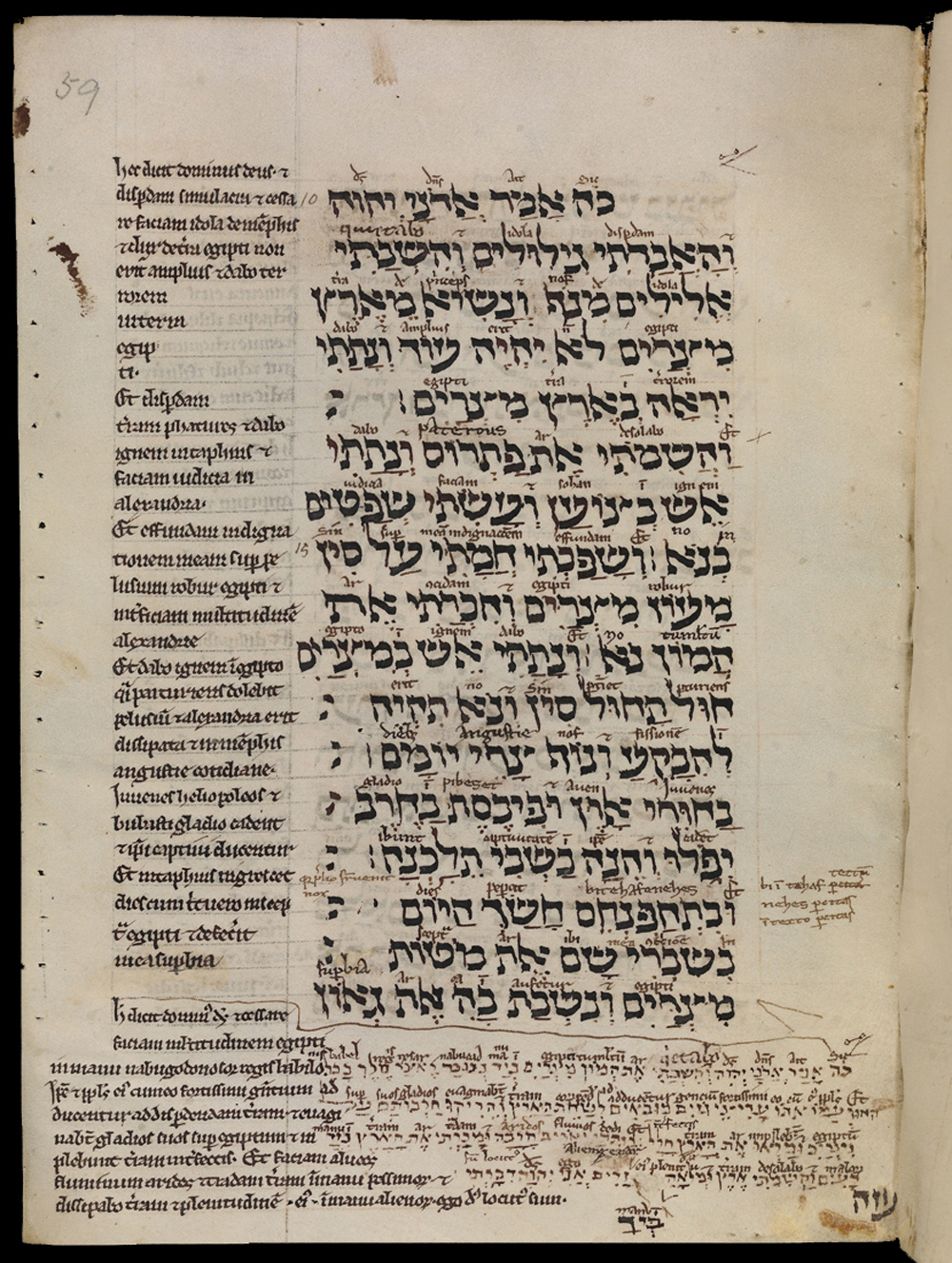
- Book of Ezekiel 30:13–18 in an English manuscript from the early 13th century, MS. Bodl. Or. 62, fol. 59a. A Latin translation appears in the margins with further interlineations above the Hebrew.
- Book: Book of Ezekiel
- Hebrew Bible part: Nevi'im
- Order in the Hebrew part: 7
- Category: Latter Prophets
- Christian Bible part: Old Testament
- Order in the Christian part: 26

Ezekiel 27 is the twenty-seventh chapter of the Book of Ezekiel in the Hebrew Bible or the Old Testament of the Christian Bible. This book contains the prophecies attributed to the prophet/priest Ezekiel, and is one of the Books of the Prophets. This chapter contains a lamentation for the fallen city of Tyre.

== Text ==
The original text was written in the Hebrew language. This chapter is divided into 36 verses.

=== Textual witnesses ===
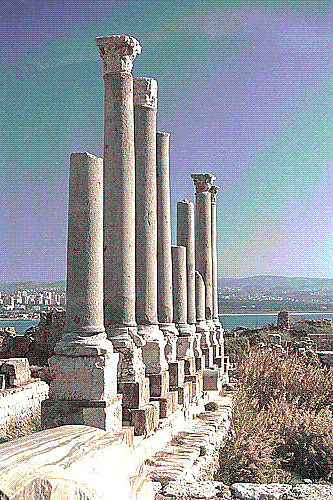
The ruins of Tyre

Some early manuscripts containing the text of this chapter in Hebrew are of the Masoretic Text tradition, which includes the Codex Cairensis (895), the Petersburg Codex of the Prophets (916), Aleppo Codex (10th century), Codex Leningradensis (1008).

There is also a translation into Koine Greek known as the Septuagint, made in the last few centuries BC. Extant ancient manuscripts of the Septuagint version include Codex Vaticanus (B; $\mathfrak{G}$^{B}; 4th century), Codex Alexandrinus (A; $\mathfrak{G}$^{A}; 5th century) and Codex Marchalianus (Q; $\mathfrak{G}$^{Q}; 6th century). (Note: Ezekiel is missing from the extant Codex Sinaiticus.)

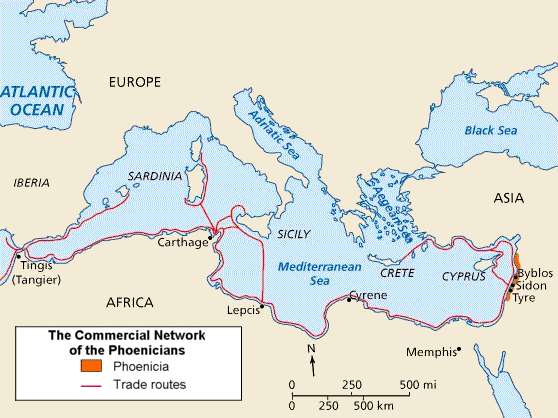
Map of trading ports related to the Phoenicians.

== Verse 2 ==
"“Now, son of man, take up a lamentation for Tyre" (NKJV)

- "Son of man" (Hebrew: בן־אדם ḇen-’ā-ḏām): this phrase is used 93 times to address Ezekiel.
- "Lamentation" (Hebrew: קינה qî-nāh; plural: קִינִים in Ezekiel 2:10 or קִּינֽוֹת in 2 Chronicles 35:25): the Hebrew word has a meaning of "elegy, dirge", "a mournful song", a funeral song in the New Living Translation.

The people of Tyre, seeing themselves as the great merchants, will have a great downfall despite their past glory. A similarly worded lament for Babylon the Great appears in the New Testament in Revelation 18:11–16.

== Verse 3a ==
and say to Tyre, which sits at the entrance to the sea, merchant of the peoples on many coastlands ...

The word for "entrance" or "gateway" is literally "entries" (plural), "reference possibly being to the two harbours of Tyre, one of which was to the north east of the island, called the Sidonian harbour, because looking towards Sidon, and the other on the south or south-east of the island, the exact position of which is uncertain owing to the silting which has taken place". Ancient Tyre was on an island, which is now connected to the mainland by a causeway.

== See also ==
- Arabia
- Arvad
- Ashurites
- Assyria
- Bashan
- Canneh
- Cyprus
- Damascus
- Dan
- Dedan
- Eden
- Egypt
- Elishah
- Gebal
- Haran
- Helbon
- Israel
- Javan
- Jerusalem
- Judah
- Kedar
- Libya
- Lydia
- Meshech
- Persia
- Raamah
- Senir
- Sheba
- Sidon
- Syria
- Tarshish
- Togarmah
- Tubal
- Tyre
- Related Bible parts: Genesis 10, Joshua 13, Isaiah 23, Ezekiel 26, Revelation 18

== Bibliography ==
- Bromiley, Geoffrey W. (1995). International Standard Bible Encyclopedia: vol. iv, Q-Z. Eerdmans. ISBN 9780802837844.
- Brown, Francis; Briggs, Charles A.; Driver, S. R. (1994). The Brown-Driver-Briggs Hebrew and English Lexicon (reprint ed.). Hendrickson Publishers. ISBN 978-1565632066.
- Clements, Ronald E (1996). Ezekiel. Westminster John Knox Press. ISBN 9780664252724.
- Gesenius, H. W. F. (1979). Gesenius' Hebrew and Chaldee Lexicon to the Old Testament Scriptures: Numerically Coded to Strong's Exhaustive Concordance, with an English Index. Translated by Tregelles, Samuel Prideaux (7th ed.). Baker Book House.
- Joyce, Paul M. (2009). Ezekiel: A Commentary. Continuum. ISBN 9780567483614.
- Würthwein, Ernst (1995). The Text of the Old Testament. Translated by Rhodes, Erroll F. Grand Rapids, MI: Wm. B. Eerdmans. ISBN 0-8028-0788-7.
