= Jeremiah 49 =

Book of Jeremiah, chapter 49

- ← chapter 48 chapter 50 →
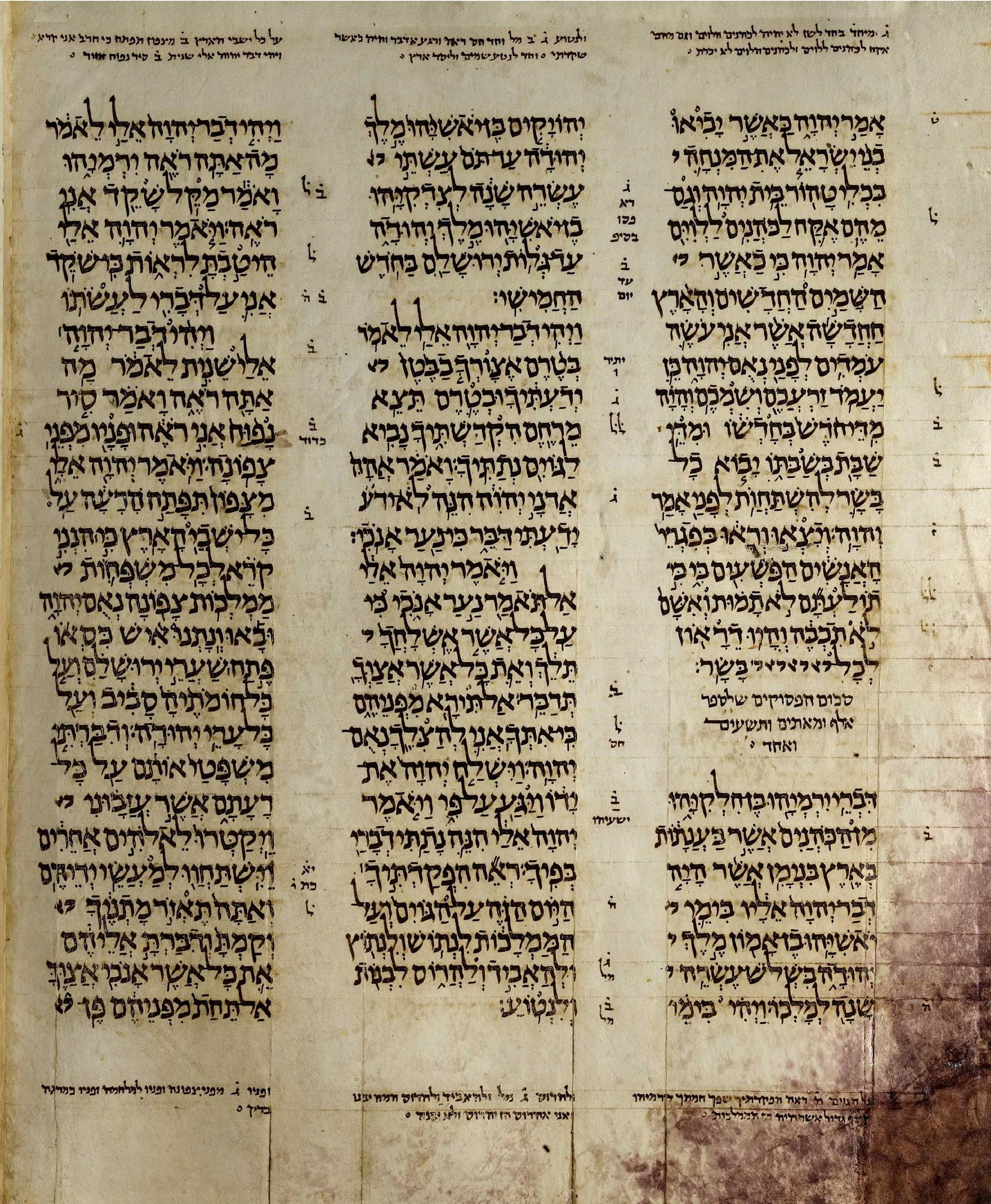
- A high resolution scan of the Aleppo Codex showing the Book of Jeremiah (the sixth book in Nevi'im).
- Book: Book of Jeremiah
- Hebrew Bible part: Nevi'im
- Order in the Hebrew part: 6
- Category: Latter Prophets
- Christian Bible part: Old Testament
- Order in the Christian part: 24

Jeremiah 49 is the forty-ninth chapter of the Book of Jeremiah in the Hebrew Bible or the Old Testament of the Christian Bible. This book contains prophecies attributed to the prophet Jeremiah, and is one of the Books of the Prophets. This chapter is part of a series of "oracles against foreign nations", consisting of chapters 46 to 51. In particular, chapters 46-49 focus on Judah's neighbors.

This chapter contains the poetic oracles against Ammon, Edom, Damascus, Kedar, Hazo, and Elam.

== Text ==
The original text was written in Hebrew. This chapter is divided into 39 verses.

=== Textual witnesses ===
Some early manuscripts containing the text of this chapter in Hebrew are of the Masoretic Text tradition, which includes the Codex Cairensis (895), the Petersburg Codex of the Prophets (916), Aleppo Codex (10th century), Codex Leningradensis (1008). Some fragments containing parts of this chapter were found among the Dead Sea Scrolls, i.e., 2QJer (2Q13; 1st century CE), with extant verses 10.

There is also a translation into Koine Greek known as the Septuagint (with a different chapter and verse numbering), made in the last few centuries BCE. Extant ancient manuscripts of the Septuagint version include Codex Vaticanus (B; $\mathfrak{G}$^{B}; 4th century), Codex Sinaiticus (S; BHK: $\mathfrak{G}$^{S}; 4th century), Codex Alexandrinus (A; $\mathfrak{G}$^{A}; 5th century) and Codex Marchalianus (Q; $\mathfrak{G}$^{Q}; 6th century).

=== Verse numbering ===
The order of chapters and verses of the Book of Jeremiah in the English Bibles, Masoretic Text (Hebrew), and Vulgate (Latin), in some places differs from that in the Septuagint (LXX, the Greek Bible used in the Eastern Orthodox Church and others) according to Rahlfs or Brenton. The following table is taken with minor adjustments from Brenton's Septuagint, page 971.

The order of Computer Assisted Tools for Septuagint/Scriptural Study (CATSS) based on Alfred Rahlfs' Septuaginta (1935) differs in some details from Joseph Ziegler's critical edition (1957) in Göttingen LXX. Swete's Introduction mostly agrees with Rahlfs' edition (=CATSS).

Hebrew, Vulgate, English	Rahlfs' LXX (CATSS)	Brenton's LXX
49:1-5,23-27,28-33	30:1-5,29-33,23-28	30:1-5,23-27,28-33
49:7-22	n/a	29:7b-22
49:34	25:20	26:1
49:35-39	25:15-19	25:35-39
42:1-22	49:1-22	

== Parashot ==
The parashah sections listed here are based on the Aleppo Codex. Jeremiah 49 is a part of the prophecies in Jeremiah 46-49 in the section of Prophecies against the nations (Jeremiah 46-51). {P}: open parashah; {S}: closed parashah.

{S} 49:1-6 {P} 49:7-11 {S} 49:12-19 {S} 49:20-22 {P} 49:23-27 {P} 49:28-33 {S} 49:34-39 {P}

== Structure ==
This chapter is divided as follows:

- Jeremiah 49:1–6: Against Ammon
- Jeremiah 49:7–22: Against Edom
- Jeremiah 49:23–27: Against Damascus
- Jeremiah 49:28–33: Against Kedar and Hazor
- Jeremiah 49:34–39: Against Elam

== Proclamation against the Ammonites (49:1–6) ==
The land belonging to the tribe of Gad (green) in the Trans-Jordan bordering the land of the Ammonites ("Amon") to the east.

The punishment of the Ammonites is mainly due to land-grabbing or wrongful land-acquisition, as if Israel is without heir. Therefore, Yahweh will destroy Rabbah, Ammon's capital city, and give the annexed land back to Israel.

=== Verse 1 ===
Against the Ammonites.
Thus says the Lord:

"Has Israel no sons?
Has he no heir?
Why then does Milcom inherit Gad,
And his people dwell in its cities?

- "Milcom": Hebrew: "Malcam", lit. "their king"; an Ammonite god (1 Kings 11:5); or "Molech" (Leviticus 18:21).

== Proclamation against Edom (49:7-22) ==
Two poems (verses 7-11 and 14-16) and two prose comments (verses 12-13 and 17-22) are addressed to Edom. The Jerusalem Bible dates this oracle to around 605 BCE. Like the section against Ammon (verse 1), these oracles begin with a series of rhetorical questions:

=== Verse 7 ===
Is wisdom no more in Teman?
Has counsel perished from the prudent?
Has their wisdom vanished?

The reference to wisdom is "perhaps a reference to Edom (Esau)'s ancestral connection with Jacob".

=== Verse 8 ===
Flee, turn back, dwell in the depths, O inhabitants of Dedan!
For I will bring the calamity of Esau upon him,
The time that I will punish him.

Eventually Yahweh is the one to punish the Edomites.

Verses 14-16 announce in poetry the sending of an unnamed messenger among the nations (including Edom). O'Connor argues that "by implication, Jeremiah is the messenger", although Obadiah 1:1 has very similar wording attributed to the prophet Obadiah:

Thus says the Lord God concerning Edom:

We have heard a report from the Lord,
And a messenger has been sent among the nations, saying,
“Arise, and let us rise up against her for battle”.

== Proclamation against Damascus (49:23-27) ==
Location of Damascus, Hamath and Arpad in Syria

Hamath and Arpad are shamed
For they have heard bad news.
They are fainthearted;
There is trouble on the sea;
It cannot be quiet.

These cities are "worried and troubled" in the Good News Translation. The reference is to the northern cities of the kingdom of Damascus: Hamath is located 213 km (132 mi) and Arpad 396 km (246 mi) north of Damascus. As they are all inland cities, biblical commentator A. W. Streane argues that the wording There is trouble [or anxiety] on the sea "is quite unsuitable topographically to this context", preferring to translate this line as "because of care, like the sea, they cannot rest" (S. R. Driver's translation). Similarly, the Good News Translation has "anxiety rolls over them like a sea, and they cannot rest".

== Proclamation against Kedar and against the kingdoms of Hazor (49:28-33) ==
=== Verse 28 ===
"Arise, go up to Kedar,

And devastate the men of the East!"

=== Verse 30 ===
"Flee, get far away! Dwell in the depths,

O inhabitants of Hazor!"

Nebuchadrezzar is the addressee of the poem's command to attack. The attack would be directed at the Arab tribes: Kedar signifies the Bedouin who lived in tents: "Take their tents and their flocks". The kingdoms of Hazor were likely to have been a confederation of Arab tribes "who have never been attacked, and therefore live securely without walls or ramparts for their defence". Hazor is not the city called Hazor mentioned in Joshua 11:10, "which was in the land of Canaan, whereas the kingdoms of Hazor, here mentioned, were evidently in Arabia, in the neighbourhood, at least, of Kedar". O'Connor notes that "no reasons for their fate appear in the poem, unless being at ease (verse 31) implies a profligate arrogance."

== Proclamation against Elam (49:34–38) ==
The word of the Lord that came to Jeremiah the prophet against Elam, in the beginning of the reign of Zedekiah king of Judah, saying ...

Behold, I will break the bow of Elam,
The foremost of their might.

Zedekiah was installed by Nebuchadnezzar as the king of Judah when Jehoiachin was deposed in March 597 BCE. Nebuchadnezzar evidently attacked Elam (east of Babylon), in the winter of 596 BCE; it may have been a fulfillment of this prophecy. Elam's devastation is described in cosmic and meteorological terms. Susa, the ancient capital of Elam, now Shush, is 1,566 kilometres (973 miles) east of Jerusalem on modern roads, a measure of the vast dimensions of the "international turmoil created by Babylon's imperialism".

== Elam restored (49:39) ==
'But it shall come to pass in the latter days:

"I will bring back the captives of Elam", says the Lord.

Streane (1913) notes that '"Elamites" are mentioned among the persons present on the great "day of Pentecost" (Acts 2:9). His opinion is that "both in the narrative in the Acts and in this prophecy, the Elamites are chiefly mentioned as representatives of the distant and less civilized Gentile nations".

== See also ==
- Ai
- Ammon
- Bozrah
- Dedan
- Edom
- Elam
- Esau
- Hazor
- Heshbon
- Judah
- Kedar
- Milcom
- Nebuchadrezzar
- Rabbah
- Red Sea
- Sodom and Gomorrah
- Teman
- Zedekiah
- Related Bible part: Isaiah 21, Book of Obadiah, Acts 2

== Sources ==
- Coogan, Michael David (2007). Coogan, Michael David; Brettler, Marc Zvi; Newsom, Carol Ann; Perkins, Pheme (eds.). The New Oxford Annotated Bible with the Apocryphal/Deuterocanonical Books: New Revised Standard Version, Issue 48 (Augmented 3rd ed.). Oxford University Press. ISBN 9780195288810.
- Huey, F. B. (1993). The New American Commentary - Jeremiah, Lamentations: An Exegetical and Theological Exposition of Holy Scripture, NIV Text. B&H Publishing Group. ISBN 9780805401165.
- O'Connor, Kathleen M. (2007). "23. Jeremiah". In Barton, John; Muddiman, John (eds.). The Oxford Bible Commentary (first (paperback) ed.). Oxford University Press. pp. 487–528. ISBN 978-0199277186.
- Thompson, J. A. (1980). A Book of Jeremiah. The New International Commentary on the Old Testament (illustrated, revised ed.). Wm. B. Eerdmans Publishing. ISBN 9780802825308.
- Würthwein, Ernst (1995). The Text of the Old Testament. Translated by Rhodes, Erroll F. Grand Rapids, MI: Wm. B. Eerdmans. ISBN 0-8028-0788-7.
