= Horonaim =

Moabite city mentioned in the Hebrew Bible

Horonaim (Hebrew: חוֹרֹנַיִם Ḥōrōnayīm) is a city in Moab, mentioned in two Hebrew Bible oracles against the nation of Moab: in the Book of Jeremiah (48), and in the Book of Isaiah, (15). In 2 Samuel (13:34), an addition from the Septuagint text (ὁδοῦ τῆς ῾Ωρωνῆν) is sometimes translated as Horonaim (in e.g. NIV, ISV), although it possibly derives from as little as a preposition.

There is some reason to identify Horonaim with the city Horonan (Moabite: 𐤇𐤅𐤓𐤍𐤍 *Ḥawrānān), named in the Mesha Stele (lines 31 and 32). The name may derive from the god Horon, or from Western Semitic words for cave, cavern, hollow or valley.

== See also ==
- Isaiah 15
