= Jeremiah 51 =

Book of Jeremiah, chapter 51

- ← chapter 50 chapter 52 →
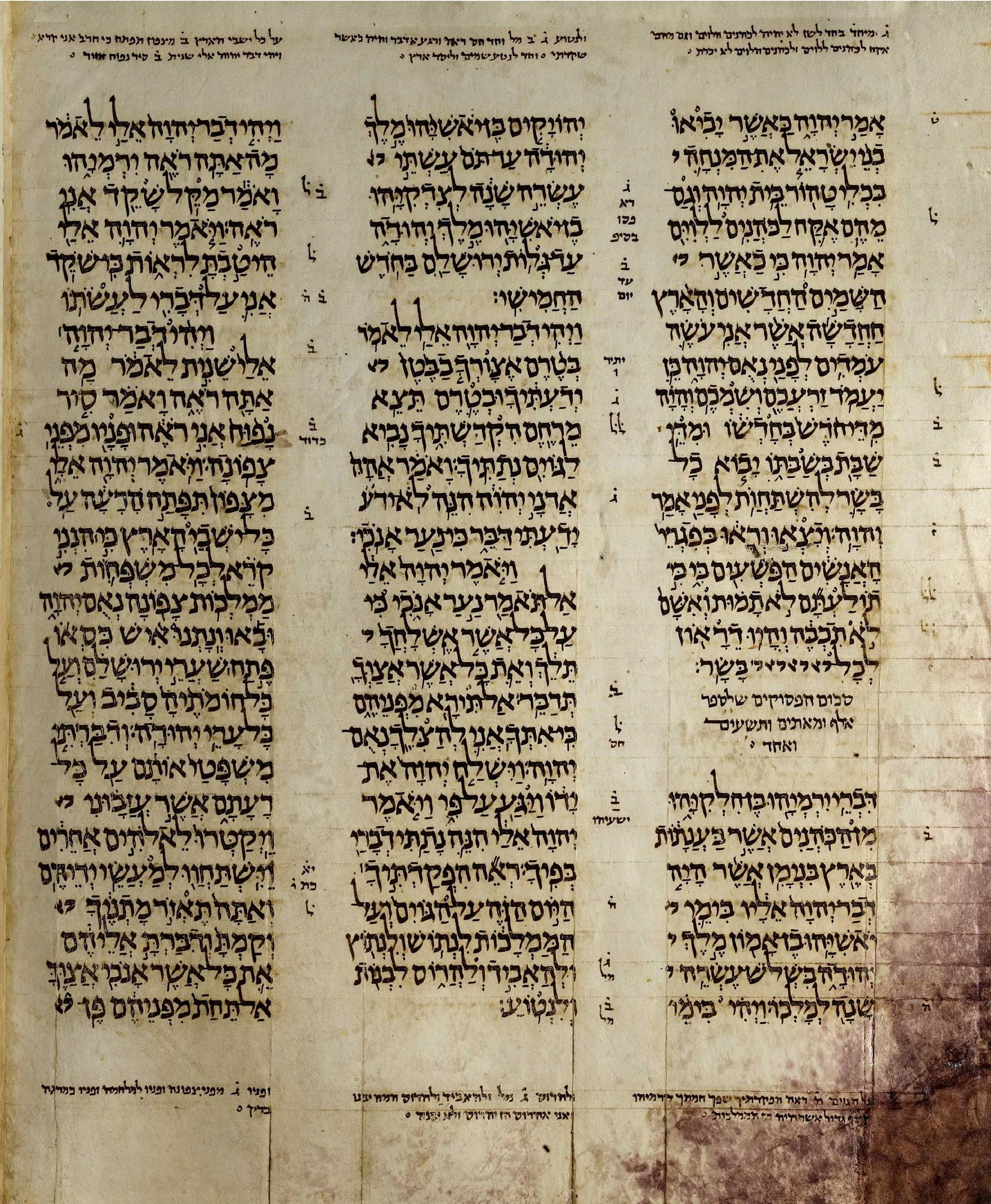
- A high resolution scan of the Aleppo Codex showing the Book of Jeremiah (the sixth book in Nevi'im).
- Book: Book of Jeremiah
- Hebrew Bible part: Nevi'im
- Order in the Hebrew part: 6
- Category: Latter Prophets
- Christian Bible part: Old Testament
- Order in the Christian part: 24

Jeremiah 51 is the fifty-first chapter of the Book of Jeremiah in the Hebrew Bible or the Old Testament of the Christian Bible. This book contains prophecies attributed to the prophet Jeremiah, and is one of the Books of the Prophets. This chapter contains the last of a series of "oracles against foreign nations" which commences in chapter 46. Chapters 50 and 51 focus on Babylon. The New American Bible (Revised Edition) denotes this chapter as "the second oracle against Babylon", following on from "the first oracle" contained in chapter 50.

== Text ==
The original text was written in Hebrew. This chapter is divided into 64 verses.

=== Textual witnesses ===
Some early manuscripts containing the text of this chapter in Hebrew are of the Masoretic Text tradition, which includes the Codex Cairensis (895), the Petersburg Codex of the Prophets (916), Aleppo Codex (10th century), Codex Leningradensis (1008).

There is also a translation into Koine Greek known as the Septuagint (with a different chapter and verse numbering), made in the last few centuries BCE. Extant ancient manuscripts of the Septuagint version include Codex Vaticanus (B; $\mathfrak{G}$^{B}; 4th century), Codex Sinaiticus (S; BHK: $\mathfrak{G}$^{S}; 4th century), Codex Alexandrinus (A; $\mathfrak{G}$^{A}; 5th century) and Codex Marchalianus (Q; $\mathfrak{G}$^{Q}; 6th century). The Septuagint version doesn't contain a part which are generally known to be verses 44d-49a in Christian Bibles.

=== Verse numbering ===
The order of chapters and verses of the Book of Jeremiah in the English Bibles, Masoretic Text (Hebrew), and Vulgate (Latin), in some places differs from that in the Septuagint (LXX, the Greek Bible used in the Eastern Orthodox Church and others) according to Rahlfs or Brenton. The following table is taken with minor adjustments from Brenton's Septuagint, page 971.

The order of Computer Assisted Tools for Septuagint/Scriptural Study (CATSS) based on Rahlfs' Septuaginta (1935) differs in some details from Joseph Ziegler's critical edition (1957) in Göttingen LXX. Swete's Introduction mostly agrees with Rahlfs' edition (=CATSS).

| Hebrew, Vulgate, English | Rahlfs' LXX (CATSS) |
|---|---|
| 51:1-64 | 28:1-64 |
| 44:1-30; 45:1-5 | 51:1-30; 51:31-35 |

== Parashot ==
The parashah sections listed here are based on the Aleppo Codex. Jeremiah 51 is a part of the prophecies "Against Babylon" in the section of Prophecies against the nations (Jeremiah 46-51). {P}: open parashah; {S}: closed parashah.

{S} 51:1-10 {S} 51:11-14 {S} 51:15-19 {P} 51:20-24 {S} 51:25-32 {S} 51:33-35 {S} 51:36-51 {P} 51:52-53 {S} 51:54-57 {S} 51:58 {S} 51:59-64 {P}

== Verse 1 ==
Thus says the Lord:

"Behold, I will raise up against Babylon
Against those who dwell in Leb Kamai
A destroying wind."

- "Leb Kamai" (לבקמי): lit. "The Midst of Those Who Rise Up Against Me"; means "Chaldea" (כשדים, kashdim), cryptically written using the "Atbash" monoalphabetic substitution cipher system.

== Verse 41 ==
"Oh, how Sheshach is taken!
Oh, how the praise of the whole earth is seized!
How Babylon has become desolate among the nations!"

- "Sheshach" (ששך): means "Babylon" (בבל, babel; also in Jeremiah 25:26), cryptically written using the "Atbash" monoalphabetic substitution cipher system.

== See also ==
- Ararat
- Ashkenaz
- Babylon
- Bel
- Chaldea
- Medes
- Minni
- Zion
- Related Bible part: Ezekiel 27

== Sources ==
- Coogan, Michael David (2007). Coogan, Michael David; Brettler, Marc Zvi; Newsom, Carol Ann; Perkins, Pheme (eds.). The New Oxford Annotated Bible with the Apocryphal/Deuterocanonical Books: New Revised Standard Version, Issue 48 (Augmented 3rd ed.). Oxford University Press. ISBN 9780195288810.
- Huey, F. B. (1993). The New American Commentary - Jeremiah, Lamentations: An Exegetical and Theological Exposition of Holy Scripture, NIV Text. B&H Publishing Group. ISBN 9780805401165.
- O'Connor, Kathleen M. (2007). "23. Jeremiah". In Barton, John; Muddiman, John (eds.). The Oxford Bible Commentary (first (paperback) ed.). Oxford University Press. pp. 487–533. ISBN 978-0199277186.
- Thompson, J. A. (1980). A Book of Jeremiah. The New International Commentary on the Old Testament (illustrated, revised ed.). Wm. B. Eerdmans Publishing. ISBN 9780802825308.
- Würthwein, Ernst (1995). The Text of the Old Testament. Translated by Rhodes, Erroll F. Grand Rapids, MI: Wm. B. Eerdmans. ISBN 0-8028-0788-7.
