= Jeremiah 46 =

Book of Jeremiah, chapter 46

- ← chapter 45 chapter 47 →
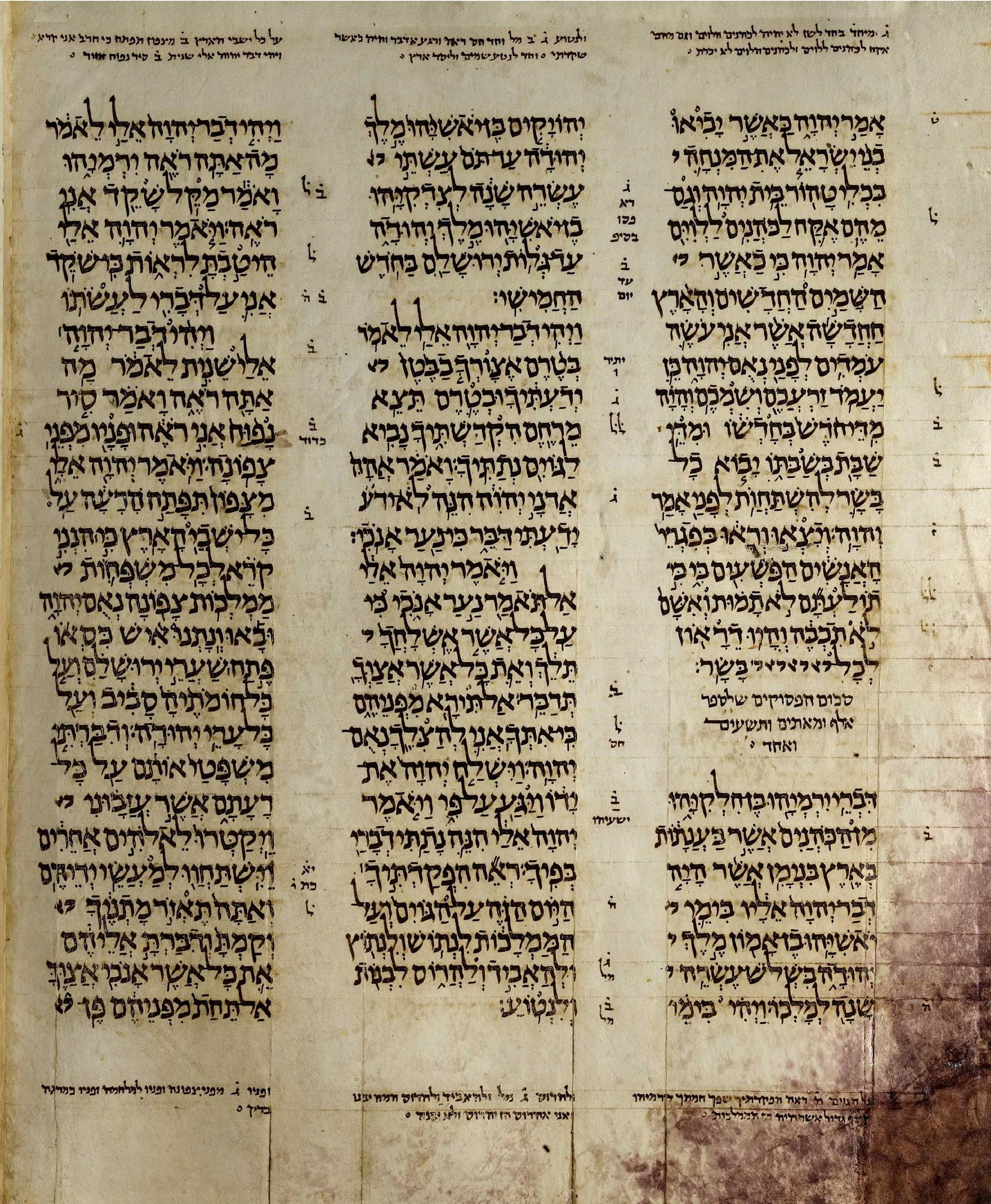
- A high resolution scan of the Aleppo Codex showing the Book of Jeremiah (the sixth book in Nevi'im).
- Book: Book of Jeremiah
- Hebrew Bible part: Nevi'im
- Order in the Hebrew part: 6
- Category: Latter Prophets
- Christian Bible part: Old Testament
- Order in the Christian part: 24

Jeremiah 46 is the forty-sixth chapter of the Book of Jeremiah in the Hebrew Bible or the Old Testament of the Christian Bible. This book contains prophecies attributed to the prophet Jeremiah, and is one of the Books of the Prophets. This chapter is part of a series of "oracles against foreign nations", consisting of chapters 46 to 51. In particular, chapters 46-49 focus on Judah's neighbors. This chapter contains the poetic oracles against Egypt.

== Text ==
The original text was written in Hebrew. This chapter is divided into 28 verses.

=== Textual witnesses ===
Some early manuscripts containing the text of this chapter in Hebrew are of the Masoretic Text tradition, which includes the Codex Cairensis (895), the Petersburg Codex of the Prophets (916), Aleppo Codex (10th century), Codex Leningradensis (1008). Some fragments containing parts of this chapter were found among the Dead Sea Scrolls, i.e., 2QJer (2Q13; 1st century CE), with extant verses 27‑28.

There is also a translation into Koine Greek known as the Septuagint (with a different chapter and verse numbering), made in the last few centuries BCE. Extant ancient manuscripts of the Septuagint version include Codex Vaticanus (B; $\mathfrak{G}$^{B}; 4th century), Codex Sinaiticus (S; BHK: $\mathfrak{G}$^{S}; 4th century), Codex Alexandrinus (A; $\mathfrak{G}$^{A}; 5th century) and Codex Marchalianus (Q; $\mathfrak{G}$^{Q}; 6th century).

== Parashot ==
The parashah sections listed here are based on the Aleppo Codex. Jeremiah 46 is a part of the prophecies in Jeremiah 46-49 in the section of Prophecies against the nations (Jeremiah 46-51). {P}: open parashah; {S}: closed parashah.

{P} 46:1-12 {P} 46:13-19 {S} 46:20-26 {P} 46:27-28 {P}

== Verse numbering ==
The order of chapters and verses of the Book of Jeremiah in the English Bibles, Masoretic Text (Hebrew), and Vulgate (Latin), differs in some places from that in the Septuagint (LXX, the Greek Bible used in the Eastern Orthodox Church and others) according to Rahlfs or Brenton. The following table is taken with minor adjustments from Brenton's Septuagint, page 971.

The order of Computer Assisted Tools for Septuagint/Scriptural Study (CATSS) based on Alfred Rahlfs' Septuaginta (1935) differs in some details from Joseph Ziegler's critical edition (1957) in Göttingen LXX. Swete's Introduction mostly agrees with Rahlfs' edition (=CATSS).

Hebrew, Vulgate, English	Rahlfs' LXX (CATSS)	Brenton's LXX
46:1,26	n/a	
46:2-25,27-28	26:2-25,27-28	
39:1-3,14-18	46:1-3,14-18	46:1-4,15-18
39:4-13	none	

== Judgment on Egypt (verses 1–26) ==
=== Verse 1 ===
The word of the Lord which came to Jeremiah the prophet against the nations.

- Cross reference: Jeremiah 25:13

This statement serves as an introduction to the oracles, as Jeremiah 1:2, 14:1 and 25:1 act as introductions to other sections.

=== Verse 2 ===
Against Egypt.
Concerning the army of Pharaoh Necho, king of Egypt, which was by the River Euphrates in Carchemish, and which Nebuchadnezzar king of Babylon defeated in the fourth year of Jehoiakim the son of Josiah, king of Judah:

- Cross reference: 2 Chronicles 35:20

In May/June 605 BCE the army of Nebuchadnezzar, at the time the Crown Prince of Babylon, defeated the troops of Pharaoh Necho II at Carchemish, on the northern Euphrates 95 km (59 mi) west of Haran (Genesis 11:31), and pursued the troop to the border of Egypt. The Euphrates is mentioned again in verses 6 and 10.

=== Verse 3 ===
"Order the buckler and shield,

And draw near to battle!

For "order", some commentators read "prepare" or, more literally, "set in line". O'Connor suggests that "it is not clear which army is being addressed, the Egyptian for the defence or the Babylonian for the attack". "Harness the horses" (verse 4, coupled with verse 9) suggests the appeal is addressed to the Egyptian armies, whereas the nineteenth century commentator Edward Plumptre argues that this verse is "a summons to the hosts of Nebuchadnezzar to prepare for their victory".

=== Verse 11 ===
Go up into Gilead and take balm,

O virgin daughter of Egypt;

in vain you shall use many medicines,

for you will not be cured.

"Virgin daughter" alludes to Egypt's geographical isolation that provides safety and protection "enjoyed by a virgin living at home under her father’s protection".

== God will preserve Israel (verses 27–28) ==
This passage contains hope-restoring words for the dismayed exiles (verse 27), that Israel (Jacob), unlike the 'exiled Egypt', will return after YHWH makes an end of all the nations 'among which I banished you' for punishment (verse 28).

== See also ==
- Egypt
- Babylon
- Carchemish
- Jehoiakim
- Judah
- Nebuchadrezzar king of Babylon
- Nile
- Necho II
- There Is a Balm in Gilead
- Related Bible part: Isaiah 19, Isaiah 20, Jeremiah 1, Jeremiah 14, Jeremiah 25

== Bibliography ==
- Coogan, Michael David (2007). Coogan, Michael David; Brettler, Marc Zvi; Newsom, Carol Ann; Perkins, Pheme (eds.). The New Oxford Annotated Bible with the Apocryphal/Deuterocanonical Books: New Revised Standard Version, Issue 48 (Augmented 3rd ed.). Oxford University Press. ISBN 9780195288810.
- Huey, F. B. (1993). The New American Commentary - Jeremiah, Lamentations: An Exegetical and Theological Exposition of Holy Scripture, NIV Text. B&H Publishing Group. ISBN 9780805401165.
- O'Connor, Kathleen M. (2007). "23. Jeremiah". In Barton, John; Muddiman, John (eds.). The Oxford Bible Commentary (first (paperback) ed.). Oxford University Press. pp. 487–533. ISBN 978-0199277186.
- Thompson, J. A. (1980). A Book of Jeremiah. The New International Commentary on the Old Testament (illustrated, revised ed.). Wm. B. Eerdmans Publishing. ISBN 9780802825308.
- Würthwein, Ernst (1995). The Text of the Old Testament. Translated by Rhodes, Erroll F. Grand Rapids, MI: Wm. B. Eerdmans. ISBN 0-8028-0788-7.
