= Siege of Azekah =

701 BCE battle between the Neo-Assyrian Empire and the Kingdom of Judah

- Part of Sennacherib's campaign in Judah
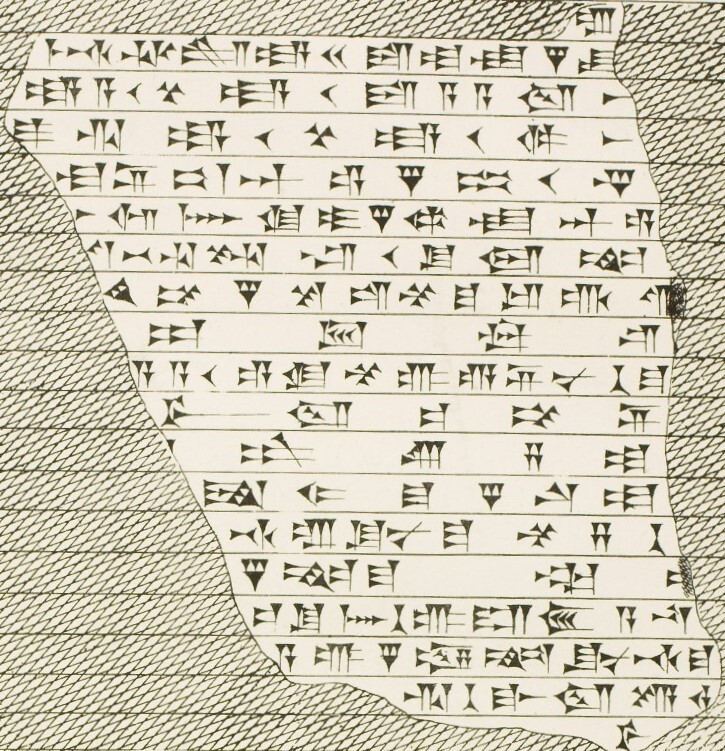
- Azekah Inscription
Date	701 BCE
Location	Azekah, Israel
Result	Assyrian victory; Azekah captured

Belligerents
Neo-Assyrian Empire	Kingdom of Judah

Commanders and leaders
Sennacherib	Unknown

Strength
Unknown	Unknown

Casualties and losses
Unknown	Heavy

The siege of Azekah was a battle between the Neo-Assyrian Empire and the Kingdom of Judah in VIII century BCE.

The most important source for the battle is the Azekah Inscription.. The battle is not mentioned in the Hebrew Bible.

Some historians claim that the Azekah Inscription describes Sennacherib's campaign in the Levant, thus dating the siege to around 701 BCE and placing it in the context of the Siege of Lachish. Others claim that the inscription describes King Sargon II's campaign against the Philistine city of Ashdod, and date the siege to 712/711 BCE.

== Possible Background ==
The context for Sennacherib's campaign in the Levant was as following: Several kingdoms in the Levant ceased to pay taxes to the Assyrian King, Sennacherib; as a result, he set out on a campaign to once again subjugate the rebelling kingdoms, among them the Jewish Kingdom of Judah led by King Hezekiah. After defeating the rebels of Ekron in Philistia he set out to subjugate Judah. Azekah, one of the fortified Jewish cities, may have been on his way to Jerusalem, the capital of Judah.

== Battlefield ==
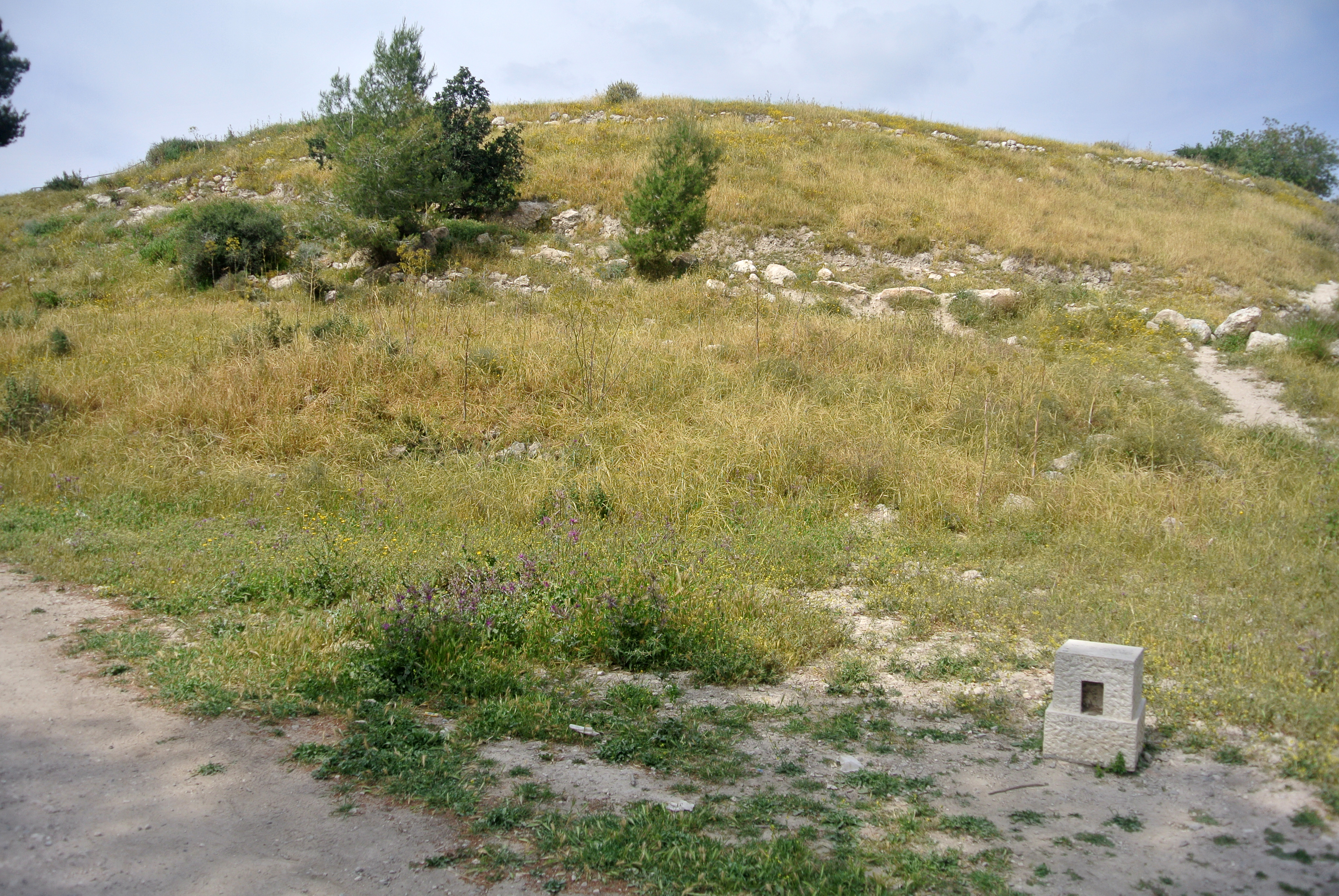
The hill

Azekah was a walled settlement situated on a hill, typical of important Jewish cities at the time.

== Order of battle ==
=== The Assyrian army ===
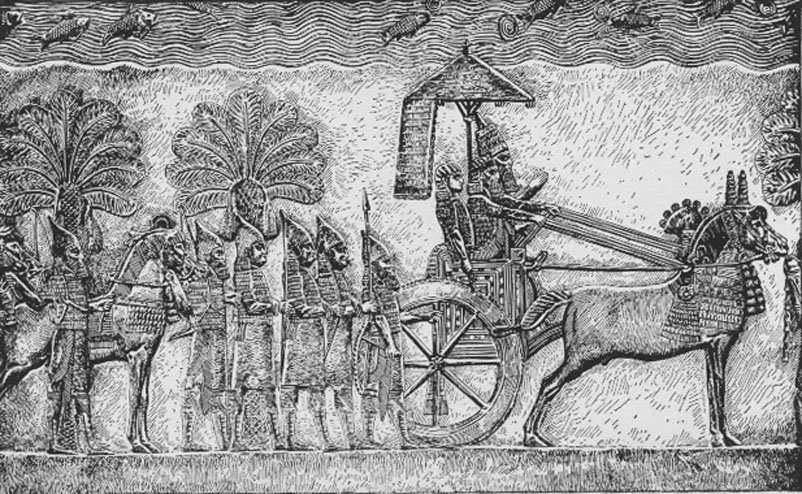
Sennacherib at the head of his army

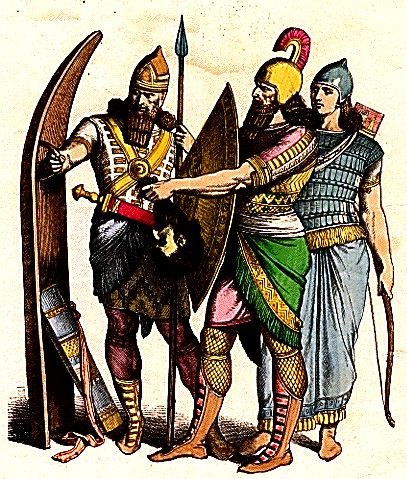
Modern drawing of Assyrian troops as seen in Assyrian reliefs

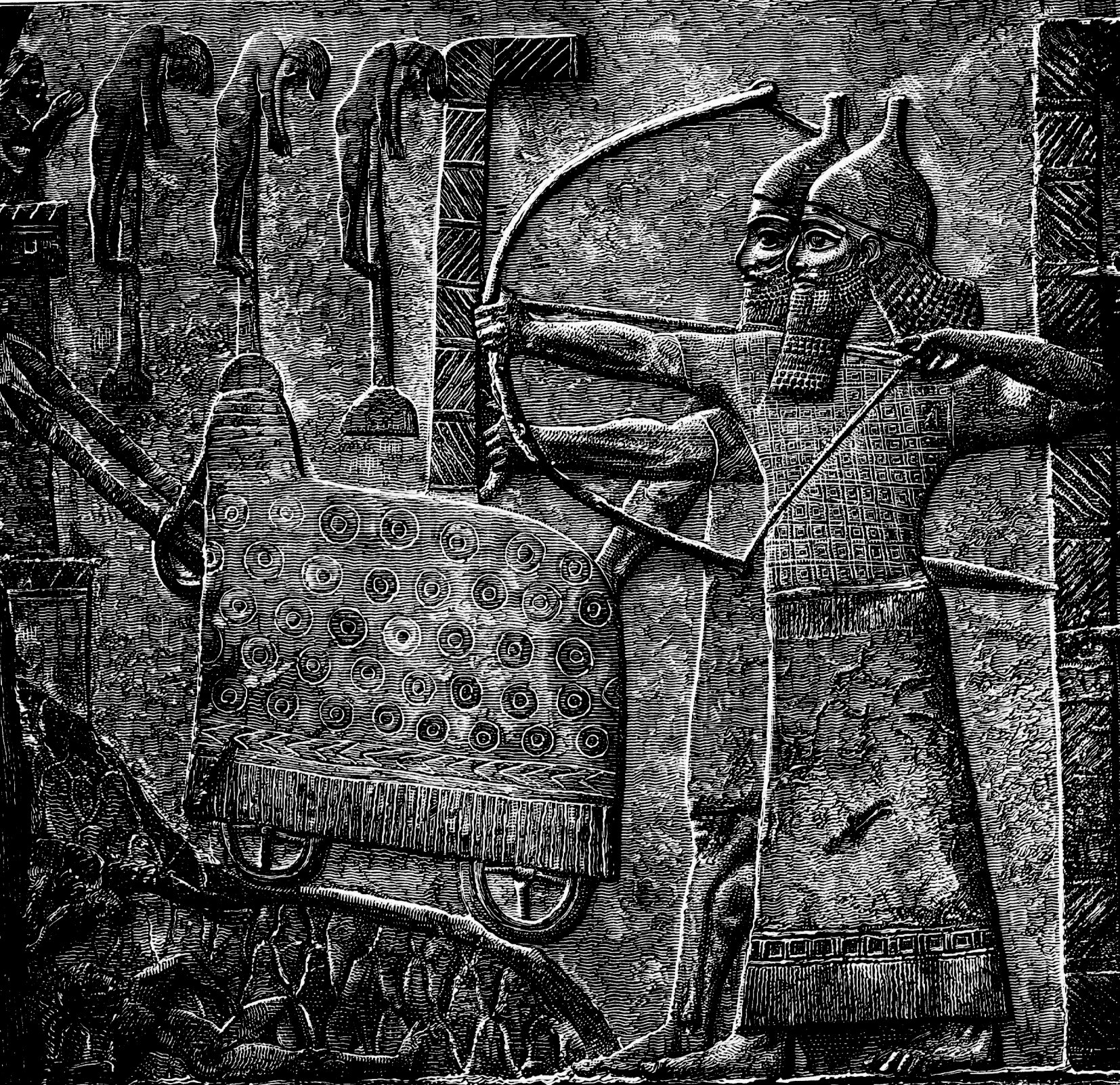
Assyrian troops with a siege engine

The Assyrian Army was the most formidable fighting force of its time and was divided mostly into three different categories:

- Infantry, which included both close-combat troops using spears, and archers. There were also hired mercenaries throwing stones. The infantry was highly trained and worked alongside military engineers in order to breach sieges.
- Cavalry; the Assyrian cavalry was among the finest in the ancient Middle East and included both close-combat cavalry with spears and mounted archers which could both use the agility of the horses alongside long-range attacks.
- Chariots, which were better equipped for open land-engagements than sieges.

=== The Jewish army ===
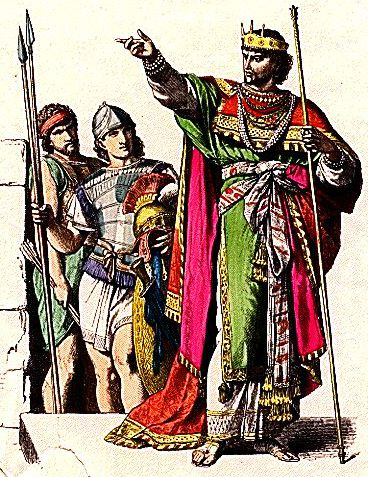
Modern depiction of a Jewish King and troops

The Jewish military force was dwarfed compared to the large, professional Assyrian army. Jewish forces mostly included local militias and mercenaries. There were barely any cavalrymen and chariots in the Jewish army, which mostly included infantry, either for close combat (spearmen) or long range combat (archers); they were also significantly less organized than the Assyrians.

== Battle ==
The battle is depicted in the Azekah Inscription, in which Sennacherib mentions some details about the battle. He mentions that he used battering rams to bring down the walls which was followed by close quarters combat between the opposing sides' infantry. Afterwards, Sennacherib ordered his cavalry to charge into the city, leading many of the defenders to rout.

Sennacherib then looted and razed the city.

== Aftermath ==
After the destruction and looting of Azekah, Sennacherib led his army further into Judah, which he once again commanded during the Siege of Lachish.

== Ancient sources ==
Azekah Inscription
