= Sennacherib's campaign in the Levant =

Military offensive by the Neo-Assyrian Empire in 701 BCE

- Part of Sennacherib's campaigns
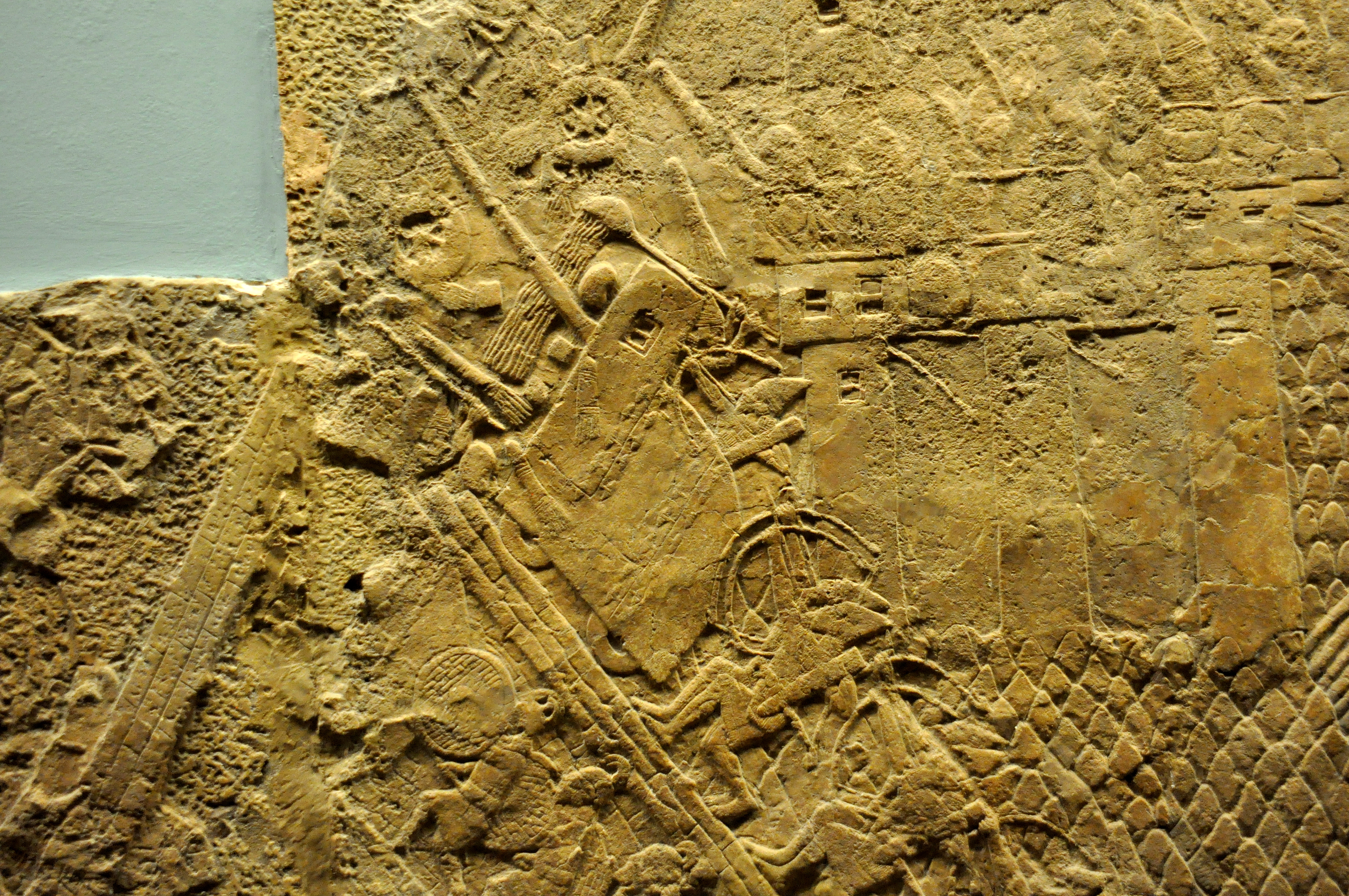
- Lachish relief showing the Siege of Lachish. Assyrian siege-engine attacking the city wall of Lachish, part of the ascending assaulting wave. Detail of a wall relief dating back to the reign of Sennacherib, 700-692 BCE. From Nineveh, Iraq, currently housed in the British Museum.
Date	701 BCE
Location	Judah, Phoenicia, Philistia (the Levant)
Result	Assyrian victory

Belligerents
Kingdom of Judah: Phoenicia; Philistia; Supported by Kushite Egypt	Neo-Assyrian Empire

Commanders and leaders
King Hezekiah; Isaiah Ben-Amotz; Eliakim Ben-Hilkiah; Joahe Ben-Asaph; Shebna; Supported by Shabaka; Taharqa	Sennacherib; Rabshakeh; Rabsaris; Tartan

Strength
Unknown	Unknown

Casualties and losses
Many killed 200,150 Judeans exiled, 46 walled cities and many other towns destroyed	Unknown

In 701 BCE, the Neo-Assyrian Empire under Sennacherib launched a military campaign to re-conquer the Levant, which had fallen out of Assyrian hands due to a localized rebellion following the death of Sennacherib's predecessor Sargon II in 705 BCE. The rebellion involved several small states: Sidon and Ashkelon, which were taken by force; and Byblos, Ashdod, Ammon, Moab, and Edom, which subsequently submitted to paying tribute to the Assyrians. Assyrian armies also invaded the Kingdom of Judah, which had participated in the rebellion under Hezekiah after being encouraged by the Egyptians. Having captured most of Judah's settlements, the Assyrians trapped Hezekiah in Jerusalem, but did not take the city itself—Hezekiah was allowed to remain in power as King of Judah in exchange for paying a large tribute to the Assyrians and also surrendering adjacent lands, which were then redistributed to Assyrian vassals in Ekron, Gaza, and Ashdod.

The events of the Assyrian campaign in Judah are famously storied in the Hebrew Bible (2 Kings 18–19; Isaiah 36–37; and 2 Chronicles 32), wherein they culminate in the "Angel of the Lord" striking down 185,000 Assyrian soldiers outside of Jerusalem's gates, prompting Sennacherib's retreat to Nineveh.

== Smaller states ==
Many smaller states in the region joined the rebellion against Assyria. Sidon and Ashkelon were taken by force, after which Byblos, Ashdod, Ammon, Moab, and Edom resubmitted to Assyrian rule without a fight. Ekron attempted to resist with help from Egypt but the Egyptians were defeated and Ekron was reinstated as an Assyrian vassal kingdom.

== Campaign in Judah ==
=== Siege of Azekah ===
Following their success in quelling the smaller rebellious states the Assyrian army turned on the Kingdom of Judah and Hezekiah. The timeline of the campaign is somewhat unclear, but it is thought that one of the first major engagements between Judah and Assyria was the Siege of Azekah, a walled settlement on a 372 meter high hill roughly 45 kilometers west of Jerusalem. Knowledge of the siege comes primarily from the Azekah Inscription, a tablet inscription from Sennacherib's reign which was found in the Library of Ashurbanipal. The inscription describes the use of earthen ramps and battering rams to overcome Azekah's formidable outer defences followed by the use of foot soldiers and cavalry to take the city. The tablet seems to imply that the defenders of Azekah were routed by the Assyrian cavalry, but the inscription is not complete and only the beginning of this section has survived. Following the city's capture the inscription states that the Assyrians looted and burned or otherwise destroyed Azekah.

=== Siege of Lachish ===
While the timeline remains unclear, it seems that the next major battle between Assyria and Judah occurred at Lachish, a walled city on a hilltop roughly 53 km south west of Jerusalem. The siege of Lachish is documented in the Hebrew Bible as well as Assyrian documents but is most prominently depicted in the Lachish reliefs which were once displayed in Sennacherib's palace at Nineveh.

The hill on which Lachish is located is steeper on the northern side, so it is thought that the Assyrians likely attacked the city from the southern slope. The Lachish reliefs depict the city's defenders shooting arrows and throwing stones down onto the Assyrian army who are shown responding with projectiles of their own. During the ongoing skirmishes the Assyrians constructed a siege ramp, evidence of which can still be seen today, to the east of the main gate and brought up siege engines which broke the defensive walls. The siege ramp at Lachish is the oldest in the world and the only known example from the Near East. It has been excavated extensively from the 1930s to as recently as 2017. The biblical accounts state that during the siege Sennacherib sent a message to Jerusalem encouraging the city's inhabitants to surrender and telling them that Hezekiah was mistaken in thinking that Yahweh would deliver the city from the Assyrian threat.

Later, when Sennacherib king of Assyria and all his forces were laying siege to Lachish, he sent his officers to Jerusalem with this message for Hezekiah king of Judah and for all the people of Judah who were there. "This is what Sennacherib king of Assyria says: On what are you basing your confidence, that you remain in Jerusalem under siege? When Hezekiah says, 'The Lord our God will save us from the hand of the king of Assyria,' he is misleading you, to let you die of hunger and thirst. Did not Hezekiah himself remove this god's high places and altars, saying to Judah and Jerusalem, 'You must worship before one altar and burn sacrifices on it'?

— 2 Chronicles 32:9–12

This message from Sennacherib makes reference to an earlier tribute paid by Hezekiah in hopes of placating the Assyrians which was gathered from the Temple of Jerusalem. This account also indicates that Jerusalem was already under siege during the events at Lachish, supporting theories that Sennacherib split his army and campaigned through the territory surrounding Jerusalem while maintaining fortifications outside of the city and encouraging the defenders to surrender as he continued to capture other cities in Judah.

The fact that this siege seems to have been passive rather than an active attempt to capture the city has led some scholars to argue that Sennacherib had not intended to capture Jerusalem by force and instead blockaded the city, cutting off vital supply lines from surrounding settlements and buying the Assyrians more time to capture cities and weaken Hezekiah's position. The fact that Sennacherib tells the citizens of Jerusalem that Hezekiah will lead them to die of "hunger and thirst" rather than at the hands of Assyrian soldiers may be seen as further evidence that Sennacherib intended to starve out the defenders rather than launch an active siege of the city. This interpretation has been used to support the argument that Sennacherib's goal was not to completely conquer Judah but to reduce its independence and reinstate it as a vassal kingdom, thus reestablishing the status-quo during the reign of his father Sargon II.

=== Events at Jerusalem ===
As suggested by II Chronicles 32:9-12 and the Assyrian royal inscription, Jerusalem was already under siege or blockade while Sennacherib and a portion of his army were laying siege to Lachish. Furthermore, both the Biblical and Assyrian accounts make mention of an earlier tribute paid to Sennacherib by Hezekiah, opening the possibility that negotiations between the two sides may have been underway for some time before the siege of Jerusalem. The Assyrian source describes what happened at Jerusalem as follows:

"As for him (Hezekiah), I confined him inside the city Jerusalem, his royal city, like a bird in a cage. I set up blockades against him and made him dread exiting his city gate. I detached from his land the cities of his that I had plundered and I gave (them) to Mitinti, the king of the city Ashdod, and Padî, the king of the city Ekron, (and) Ṣilli-Bēl, the king of the land Gaza, (and thereby) made his land smaller. To the former tribute, their annual giving, I added the payment (of) gifts (in recognition) of my overlordship and imposed (it) upon them."

Sennacherib describes dividing the conquered parts of Judah among neighboring vassal kings in Ashdod, Ekron, and Gaza which may illustrate that Sennacherib knew he was capable of conquering Judah without engaging in a long and costly siege of Jerusalem. Furthermore, archaeological evidence suggests that Jerusalem was well fortified and defended, a fact which could have dissuaded the Assyrian army from engaging in a direct assault of the city. With the bulk of Judah's territory under his control or that of his vassals there may have been little reason to actively attack Jerusalem rather than starve the city into submission.

Due to the language used in the above quotation scholars have cited the quote in arguing that there was never a true siege of Jerusalem. These scholars argue that the city was encircled by Assyrian military camps to cut off from supply lines which might have allowed the city to hold out against Sennacherib's army in the event of a direct siege. Some of this argument centers around uncertainty about the meaning of the word "Halsu" in the Assyrian text, which has been interpreted as meaning either siege walls or blockade. Proponents of the blockade theory have cited the lack of description and evidence for a siege in the Assyrian royal inscriptions as evidence that no direct attack on the city occurred or was intended. Though the biblical account alludes to a siege, no fighting or assaults on the city are described. Sennacherib's threat sent from Lachish does not seem to threaten direct violence but rather says that the citizens of Jerusalem will die of hunger and thirst if they remain in the city and loyal to Hezekiah.

Following the above quote, the royal inscription moves on to the end of the conflict:

"As for him, Hezekiah, fear of my lordly brilliance overwhelmed him and, after my (departure), he had the auxiliary forces (and) his elite troops whom he had brought inside to strengthen the city Jerusalem, his royal city, thereby gaining reinforcements, (along with) 30 talents of gold, 800 talents of silver, choice antimony, large blocks of ..., ivory beds, armchairs of ivory, elephant hide(s), elephant ivory, ebony, boxwood, garments with multi-colored trim, linen garments, blue-purple wool, red-purple wool, utensils of bronze, iron, copper, tin, (and) iron, chariots, shields, lances, armor, iron belt-daggers, bows and uṣṣu-arrows, equipment, (and) implements of war, (all of) which were without number, together with his daughters, his palace women, male singers, (and) female singers brought into Nineveh, my capital city, and he sent a mounted messenger of his to me to deliver (this) payment and to do obeisance."

It is at this point that the Assyrian source begins to conflict with the version of events laid out in the Bible. Here Sennacherib states that the war ended when Hezekiah was overwhelmed by fear of his "lordly brilliance" and submitted to paying a large tribute of soldiers, hostages, gold and silver, weapons, and other valuables to be delivered to Nineveh. This could suggest that Hezekiah was overwhelmed by Assyrian strength at arms and, with most of his territory divided between Assyrian vassals, saw submission to Sennacherib's terms as his only viable option for remaining on the throne of Judah. The Biblical account gives an entirely different series of events when describing the end of the war. Upon hearing the message sent by Sennacherib from Lachish, Hezekiah tore his clothes, donned sackcloth, and commanded his palace administrator and leading priests to do the same before sending them to consult the prophet Isaiah. Isaiah then told them:

"Tell your master, 'This is what the LORD says: Do not be afraid of what you have heard—those words with which the underlings of the king of Assyria have blasphemed me.Listen! I am going to put such a spirit in him that when he hears a certain report, he will return to his own country, and there I will have him cut down with the sword.'" (2 Kings 19:1–7).

According to the Bible, the angel of the Lord put to death 185,000 soldiers of the Assyrians. Sennacherib then fled to Nineveh, where he was assassinated in 681 BC by his sons. Nothing is said of Judah's status as an Assyrian vassal kingdom after the war. Some have cited the continuation of Judah's vassal status as evidence that Sennacherib was not successful in his war because Judah was not annexed and Hezekiah remained on the throne. Others argue that this is evidence that Sennacherib succeeded in his goals and that, because Judah was largely divided between other vassal states and had lost nearly all means of production, the kingdom had little to offer Assyria economically and thus was allowed to remain in the empire as a weakened vassal kingdom rather than being annexed and becoming an Assyrian province.

The biblical account, and Sennacherib's sudden departure indicated in the royal inscriptions have prompted some scholars to believe that some sort of calamity did befall the Assyrian army at Jerusalem. Most prominent is the theory that some kind of plague or sickness swept through the Assyrian army camps outside of Jerusalem. Supporters of this theory contend that the outbreak of sickness or plague caused Sennacherib to swiftly conclude his negotiations with Hezekiah, return to Nineveh, and accept his tribute in the Assyrian capital rather than enter the city to take tribute and observe new oaths of loyalty in Jerusalem. Other scholars point to previous conflicts in which the Assyrians allowed rebellious vassals to remain on their thrones after the conclusion of military campaigns against them to bolster claims that there was nothing particularly unusual about the conclusion of Sennacherib's war with Judah and that following negotiations Sennacherib left with his army intact. Some speculate that either an unsuccessful siege of the city or the exhaustion of his army following their previous battles prompted Sennacherib's retreat and his leniency towards Hezekiah.
