= Sil-Bel =

Ancient Philistine king of Gaza during the 7th century BCE

Ṣil-Bel (Akkadian: 𒉣𒂗 ṣil-bēl) or Ṣilli-Bel (Akkadian: 𒄑𒈪𒂗) was a Philistine king of Gaza during the 7th century BCE. He is mentioned in the annals of several consecutive kings of the Neo-Assyrian empire spanning a time frame from 701 - 667 BCE. His immediate predecessor is referenced but unnamed in Assyrian inscriptions, but the name of the king before that was Hanunu.

The first mention of Silli-Bel comes in the context of Sennacherib's campaign in the Levant in 701 BCE. Egyptian forces had compelled many of the Palestinian city kingdoms, including Gaza, to participate in their anti-Assyrian campaign, which coincided with the revolt of Hezekiah of Judah against Assyrian rule. Sennacherib and the Assyrian forces put down the revolt and pushed back Egyptian forces. According to Sennacherib's Annals, Sil-Bel, along with his fellow Philistine kings, Mitinti of Ascalon and Padi of Ekron, were given several fortified Judean cities that Sennacherib had conquered during his campaign.

He is mentioned by Esarhaddon in the Nineveh Prism A as one of the kings who contributed building materials for the construction of his palace there. The inscription reads:

"I summoned the kings of Hatti and Across the River (Syria-Palestine): (v 55) Ba'alu, king of Tyre, Manasseh, king of Judah, Qa'us-gabri, king of Edom, Musuri, king of Moab, Sil-Bel, king of Gaza, Mitinti, king of Ashkelon, Ikausu, king of Ekron, king of Byblos, (v 60) Mattan-Ba'al, king of Arvad, Abi-Ba'al, king of Samsimurruna, Bidi-il, king of Bit-Ammon, Aḫi-Milki, king of Ashdod — twelve kings from the shore of the sea; … (Lines v 73b-vi 1) I sent orders to all of them for large beams, tall columns, (and) very long planks (v 75) of cedar (and) cypress, grown on Mount Sirara and Mount Lebanon, which from early days grew thick and tall, (and) they had bull colossi (made of) pendu-stone, lamassu-statues, zebus, paving stones, slabs of marble, pendu-stone, breccia, colored marble, brownish limestone, (and) girimhilibu-stone, (everything that was) needed for my palace, dragged with much trouble (and) effort from the midst of the mountains, the place of their origin, to Nineveh, my capital city.

During the rule of Ashurbanipal (669 - 627 BCE), Silli-Bel is mentioned in the Rassam Cylinder - C, not A, which does not mention all the kings' names - as one of the kings compelled to contribute forces for his campaign against Egypt and the Arab nomads. The text reads:

"Ba'al, king of Tyre, Manasseh, king of Judah, Qaushgabri, king of Edom, Musuri, King of Moab, Sil-Bel, king of Gaza …, Ammi-nadbi, king of Beth Ammon …, Kisu, King of Silua [Sela?], …, together 12 kings from the seashore, the islands and the mainland; servants who belong to me, brought heavy gifts (tamartu) to me and kissed my feet. I made these kings accompany my army over the land — as well as (over) the sea-route with their armed forces and their ship (respectively)..."
