= Sphinx of Memphis =

Stone sphinx located near the remains of Memphis, Egypt

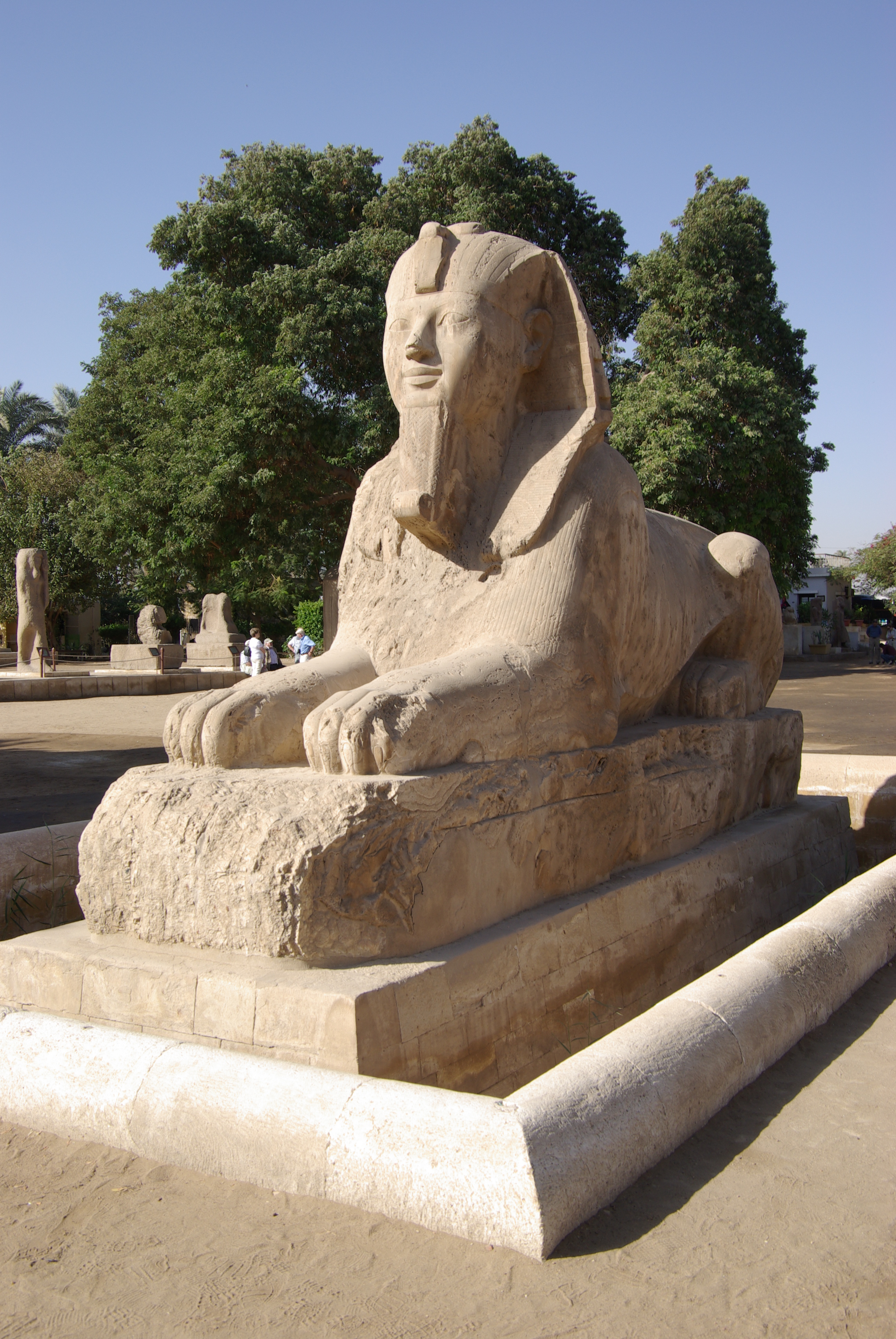
- Material: Alabaster
- Size: length: 8 m height: 4 m
- Created: c. 1550 BC
- Discovered: 1912; Egypt

The Sphinx of Memphis or Alabaster Sphinx is a stone sphinx located near the remains of Memphis, Egypt. The carving is believed to have taken place between 1700 and 1400 BCE, which was during the 18th Dynasty. It is not known which pharaoh is being honored and there are no inscriptions to supply this information. Facial features imply that the Sphinx is honoring Hatshepsut, or Amenhotep II, or Amenhotep III.

== Discovery ==
The Alabaster Sphinx was discovered in 1912 by Flinders Petrie, when an affiliate from the British School in America spotted a uniquely carved object jutting out of a sand hill. It was so far in the season that excavation was useless, but a year later in 1913, further digging displayed that the object was a Sphinx's tail.

== Composition ==
The sphinx is carved from a block of alabaster, a yellowish white, soft stone, which was considered beautiful in ancient Egypt and was believed to have a mystical connection to the Sun.

== Physical attributes ==
With a length of 8 m (26 ft) and a height of 4 m (13 ft), the Sphinx of Memphis is considerably smaller than the more recognized Great Sphinx of Giza, but one of the largest monuments ever made from Egyptian alabaster. At those dimensions, it is estimated to weigh around 90 tons. It is supported by a foundation that makes it appear to rise out of the sand. Particularly unusual about the Sphinx of Memphis are the striations on its left side, which are uncommon on Egyptian monuments.

== Other information ==
As years passed from the sphinx's creation, people ravaged Memphite temples and the Sphinx of Memphis is one of the few masterpieces that survived this pillaging. During its time, this statue was also displayed near a temple in honor of Ptah. Ptah was one of the Egyptians' world-creator gods.

== See also ==
- Sphinx of Taharqo
