= Sphinx of Taharqo =

Ancient Egypt sculpture

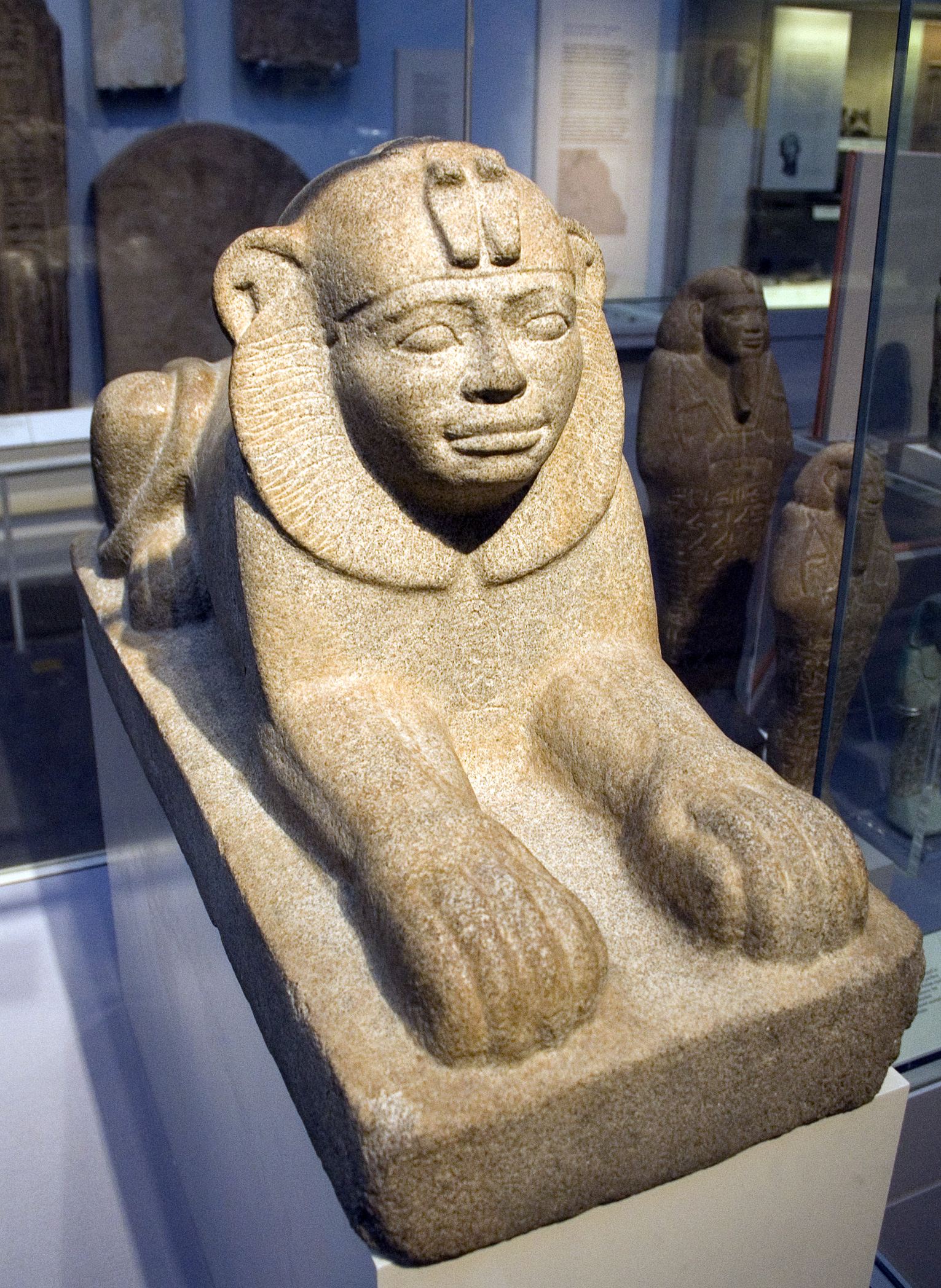
- front view
- Material: granite gneiss
- Created: 680BC (circa)
- Discovered: Northern Dongola Reach
- Present location: G65/10, British Museum, London
- Identification: EA 1770; Reg number:1932,0611.1

The Sphinx of Taharqo is a granite gneiss statue of a sphinx with the face of Taharqo. He was a Nubian king, who was one of the 25th Egyptian Dynasty (about 747–656 BC) rulers of the Kingdom of Kush. It is now in the British Museum in London.

While the Sphinx of Taharqo is significantly smaller (73 centimeters long) than the Great Sphinx of Giza (73 meters long), it is notable for its prominent Egyptian and Kushite elements. The lion portrayed in the sphinx is done in classic Egyptian style, while the face of the Sphinx is clearly that of Taharqo. The hieroglyphs on the statue explain that it is a portrait of the great King Taharqo, the fourth pharaoh to rule over the combined kingdoms of Kush and Ancient Egypt during the Third Intermediate Period. The sphinx is made of sandy grey granite.

== Taharqo ==
Taharqo was the last Nubian king who ruled over Egypt. He was defeated by the Assyrian kings Esarhaddon and Aššurbanipal. His reign lasted from 690 when he succeeded Shebitqo (or Shabaka) to his death in 664 BCE. He was the son of Piye and Abar and the father to his daughter, Amenirdis II. Taharqo was one of the rulers of Kush who dominated Egypt as the Twenty-fifth Dynasty. He was a significantly important ruler, initiating a golden age for his new kingdom. Although Taharqo was not of Egyptian descent, he worshipped the Egyptian god Amun, built pyramids and temples in the Egyptian model, and had his officials write in Egyptian hieroglyphics.

== The statue ==
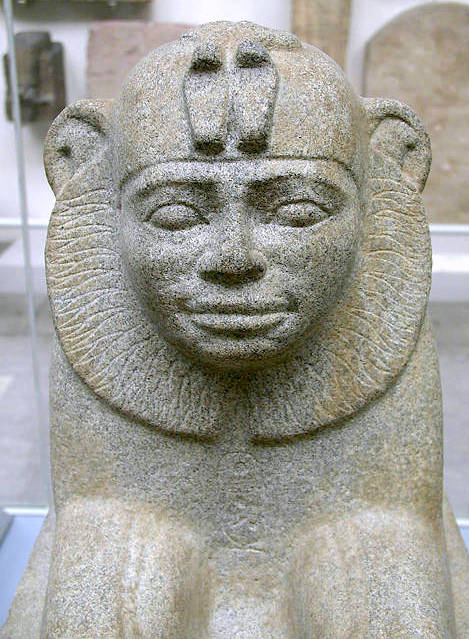
Pharaoh Taharqa of the Twenty-fifth Dynasty of Egypt depicted as a sphinx, now exhibited at the British Museum. Taharqa was a recurring enemy of Esarhaddon, defeating his planned invasion of Egypt in 673 BC and in turn being defeated by Esarhaddon in 671 BC.

The statue is a sphinx, representing here the immense power of the Egyptian and Kushite pharaoh Taharqo, whose face is shown. The headdress bears two uraei, the Nubian symbol of kingship, and Taharqo's name appears in a cartouche on the sphinx's chest. The statue is called "a masterpiece of Kushite art."

The statue was excavated at Temple T, in the area east of the south-eastern part of the Temple of Amun at Kawa (now Gematon), in Nubia (now Sudan), during excavations there by the Archaeological Mission of the University of Oxford during the 1930s. Construction of the stone temple was started in 683 BC by Taharqo.

The statue is a British Museum "Highlight" object and was selected as the twenty-second object in the series A History of the World in 100 Objects selected by British Museum director Neil MacGregor and broadcast on BBC Radio 4 in 2010.

== See also ==
- Statues of Amun in the form of a ram protecting King Taharqa
- Sphinx of Memphis

== Reading ==
- Caygill, M. The British Museum A-Z Companion London: The British Museum Press, 1999
- Hochfield, S. and Riefstahl, E. (eds.) Africa in Antiquity Brooklyn, N.Y.: Brooklyn Museum, 1978, pp. 50–51, 168
- James, T.G.H. and Davies, W.V. Egyptian sculpture London: The British Museum Press, 1983
- Laming Macadam, M.F. The Temples of Kawa Oxford: 1949 (vol. I), 1955 (vol. II)
- Mysliwiec, Karol Royal Portraiture of the Dynasties XXI-XXX 1988: pp. 33, 40
- Nicholson and Shaw, Ancient Egyptian Materials and Technology Cambridge, 2000, p. 34
- Phillips, T. (ed.), Africa London, 1995, p. 49 [fig. 5)
- Strudwick, N. Masterpieces of Ancient Egypt London, 2006, pp. 262–3.
- Taylor, J.H. Egypt and Nubia London: The British Museum Press, 1991
- Welsby, D. A. The Kingdom of Kush. The Napatan and Meroitic Empires London: The British Museum Press, 1996

Preceded by 21: Lachish reliefs	A History of the World in 100 Objects; Object 22	Succeeded by 23: Kang Hou Gui
