= Azekah Inscription =

Tablet inscription of the reign of Sennacherib

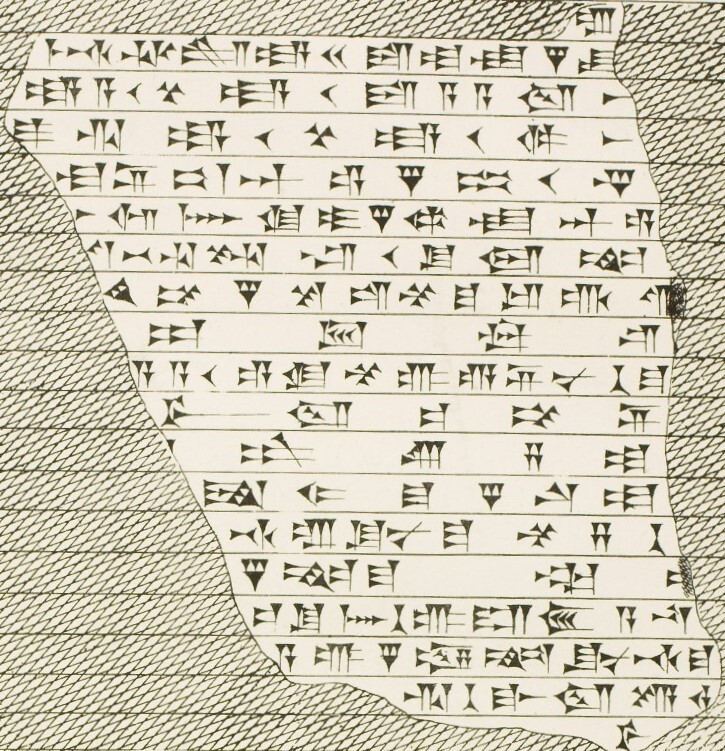
- The text of the first fragment discovered (K.6205), published in Rawlinson's editio princeps
- Material: Clay
- Writing: Akkadian cuneiform
- Created: c. 700 BC
- Discovered: Mid 19th century. Combined identification in [1903]
- Present location: British Museum
- Identification: K.6205 + BM 82-3-23,131

The Azekah Inscription, is a tablet inscription of the reign of Sennacherib (reigned 705 to 681 BC) discovered in the mid-nineteenth century in the Library of Ashurbanipal. It was identified as a single tablet by Nadav Na'aman in 1974.

It describes an Assyrian campaign by Sennacherib against Hezekiah, King of Judah, including the conquest of Azekah.

== Inscription ==
The inscription on the combined tablet has been translated as follows:

(3) […Ashur, my lord, encourage]ed me and against the land of Ju[dah I marched. In] the course of my campaign, the tribute of the ki[ng(s)...

(4) […with the mig]ht of Ashur, my lord, the province of [Hezek]iah of Judah like […

(5) […] the city of Azekah, his stronghold, which is between my [bo]rder and the land of Judah […

(6) [like the nest of the eagle? ] located on a mountain ridge, like pointed iron daggers without number reaching high to heaven […

(7) [Its walls] were strong and rivaled the highest mountains, to the (mere) sight, as if from the sky [appears its head? …

(8) [by means of beaten (earth) ra]mps, mighty? Battering rams brought near, the work of […], with the attack by foot soldiers, [my] wa[rriors…

(9) […] they had seen [the approach of my cav]alry and they had heard the roar of the mighty troops of the god Ashur and [their] he[arts] became afraid […

(10) [The city Azekah I besieged,] I captured, I carried off its spoil, I destroyed, I devastated, [I burned with fire…

(11) [ ], a royal ci[ty] of the Philistines (Pi-lis-ta-a-a), which [Hezek]iah had captured and strengthened for himself

== Transliteration ==
Na'aman's transliteration of lines 3, 4, 5 and 11 is shown below:

(3) [… AN.SAR béli u-tak-kil-a] n-ni-ma a-na KUR Ja-[u-di lu al-lik ina] me-ti-iq KASKAL II ja man-da-at-tu sa LU [GAL MES KUR…. amhur….

(4) […ina da-n] a?-ni sa AN.SAR EN-ja na-gu-u [sa mHa-za-qi-j] a-a-u KUR Ja-u-da-a-a GIM […

(5) [… ] URU A-za-qa-a E tuk-la-te-su sa ina bi-ri [t mi-i] s-ri-ja u KUR Ja-u-di [… v

(11) [URU GN URU] LUGAL-ti sa KUR Pi-lis-ta-a-a [sa] [m] [Ha]-[za-qi-j] a-a-u e-ki-mu u-dan-ni-nu-su-ma […

Winckler suggested the text referred not to Judah but to "Yadiya" (Sam'al)

== See also ==
- List of artifacts significant to the Bible
- Lachish reliefs
