= Statues of Amun in the form of a ram protecting King Taharqa =

Ancient Egyptian statues

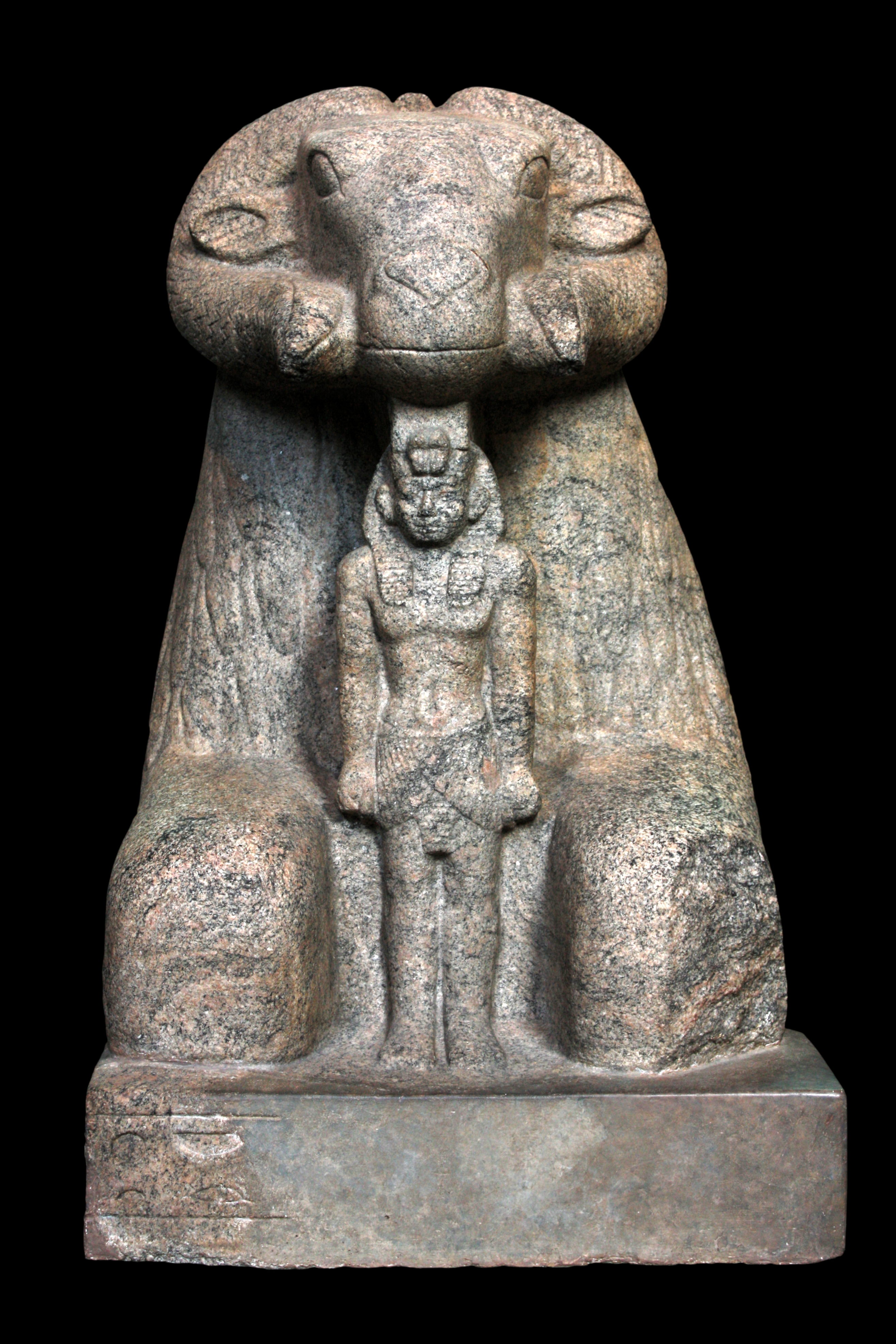
Granite statue of Amun in the form of a ram protecting King Taharqa, British Museum

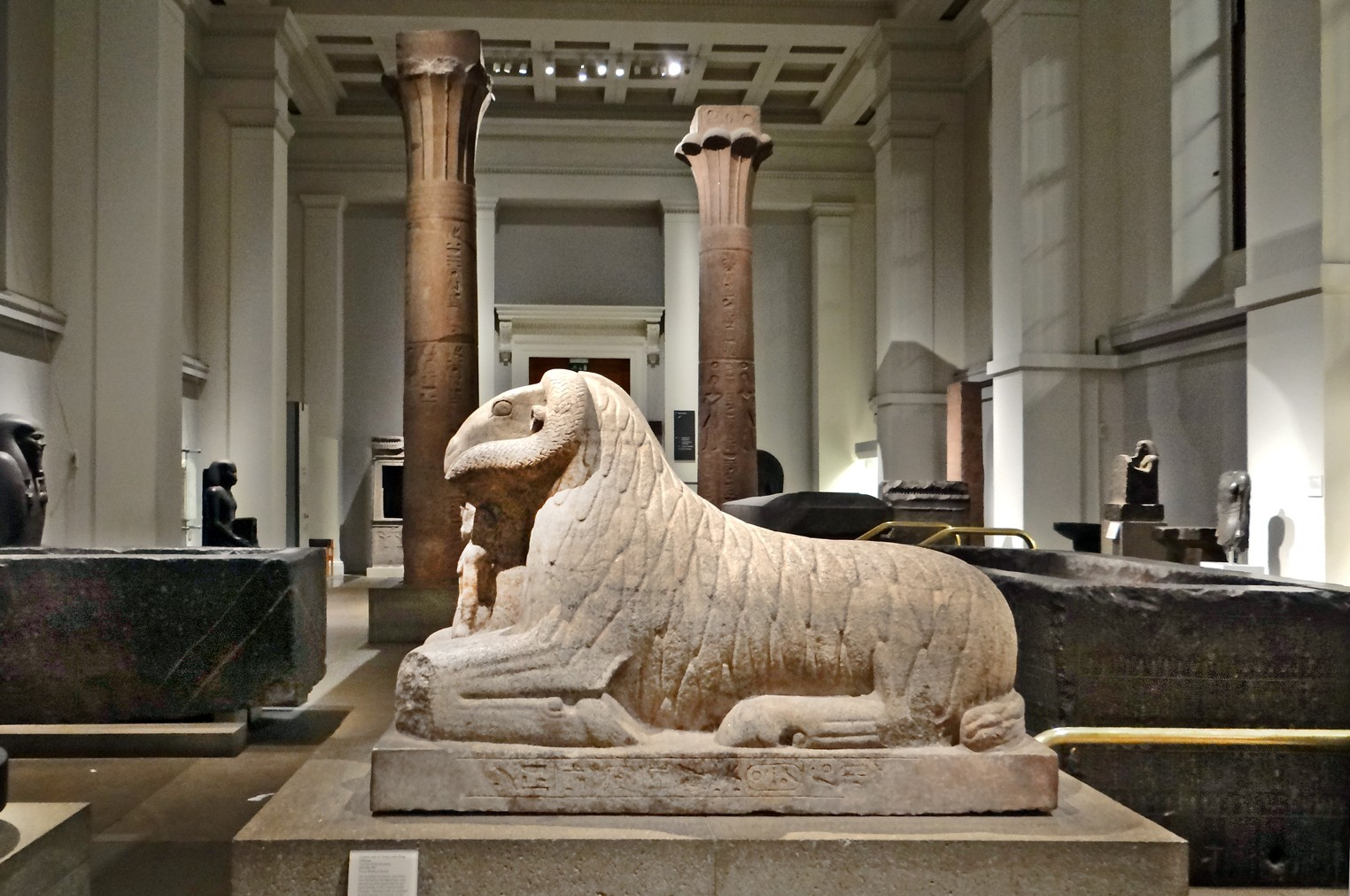
Granite statue of Amun in the form of a ram protecting King Taharqa, British Museum

At least three ancient Egyptian granitic gneiss statues of Amun in the form of a ram protecting King Taharqa were displayed at the Temple of Amun at Kawa in Nubia. Construction of the stone temple was started in 683 BC by the pharaoh Taharqa. The ram is one of the animals sacred to Amun and several temples dedicated to Amun, including the one at Karnak, featured ram or ram-headed sphinx statues.

== Discovery ==
The rams were found by Professor Francis Llewellyn Griffith during his excavations at the temple in 1930–1931. Two sets of paired sandstone bases, in front of the first and second pylons respectively, were found at the western approach to the stone temple, and figures of rams were found on two of them. The pairing ram to the one at the British Museum is held at the Ashmolean Museum, Oxford, where many of the artefacts from the excavations at Kawa are held. The British Museum's example was acquired in 1933 from Professor Griffith's Oxford Excavations in Nubia.

== The British Museum statue ==
The base of the statue is 1.63 m (5 ft 4 in) long and 0.63 m (2 ft 1 in) wide, and the statue is 1.06 m (3 ft 6 in) high. The ram is lying on its stomach with its forelegs folded under it, and between them it protects a standing figure of King Taharqa. A hole in the top of the ram's head indicates where a gilded disk would originally have fitted. A hieroglyphic inscription runs round the sides of the plinth from front to back and proclaims Taharqa as the son of Amun and Mut, Lady of Heaven, 'who fully satisfies the heart of his father Amun'.

== The Ashmolean statue ==
The Ashmolean statue is displayed in the redesigned Egyptian and Nubian galleries, opened in 2011.

In 2005, the then-writer-in-residence at the Ashmolean Museum, Chuma Nwokolo, Jr, wrote a poem inspired by the statue and other exhibits about Taharqa.

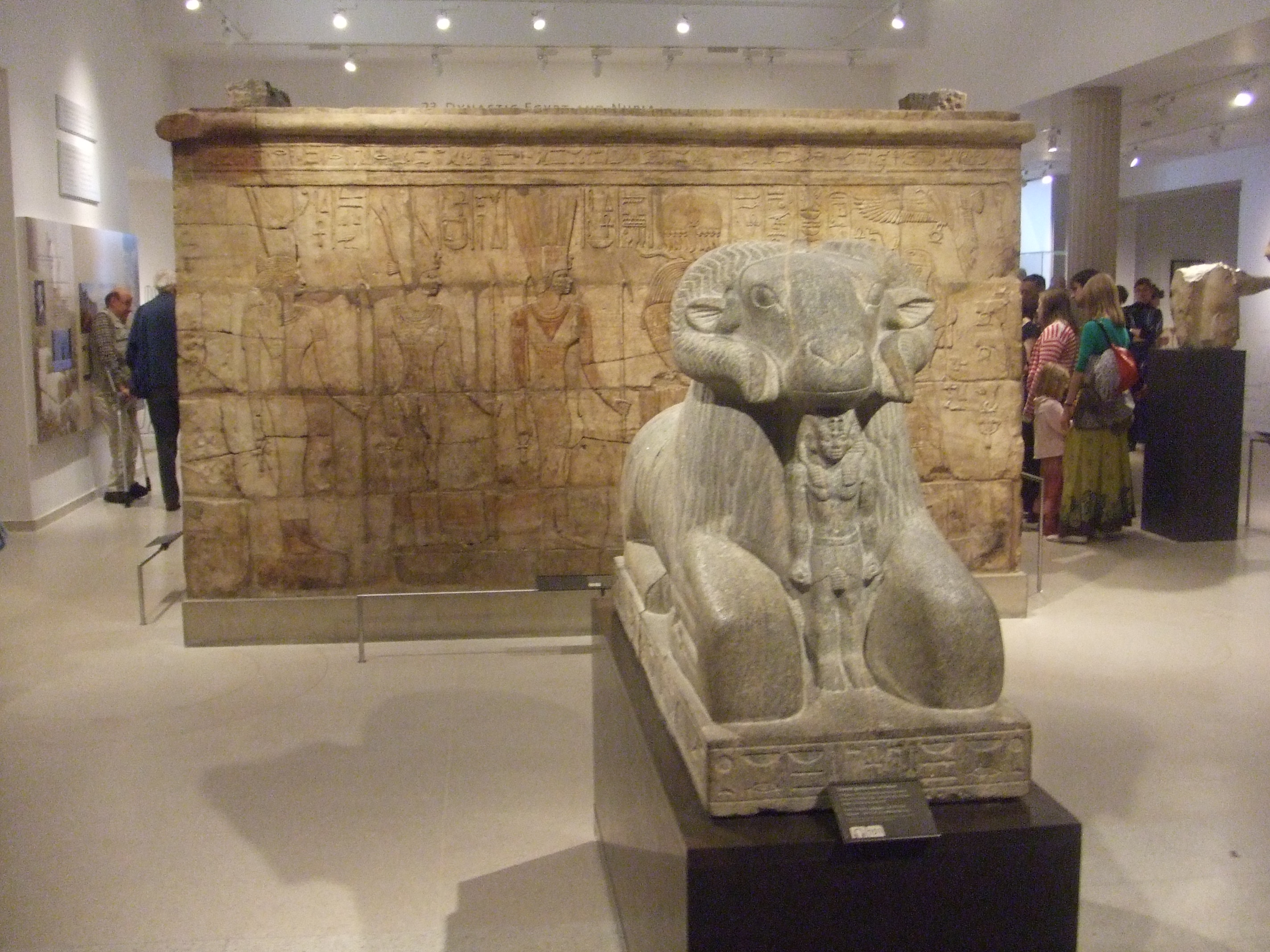
Shrine and Sphinx of Taharqa. Taharqa appears between the legs of the Ram-Spinx, Ashmolean Museum

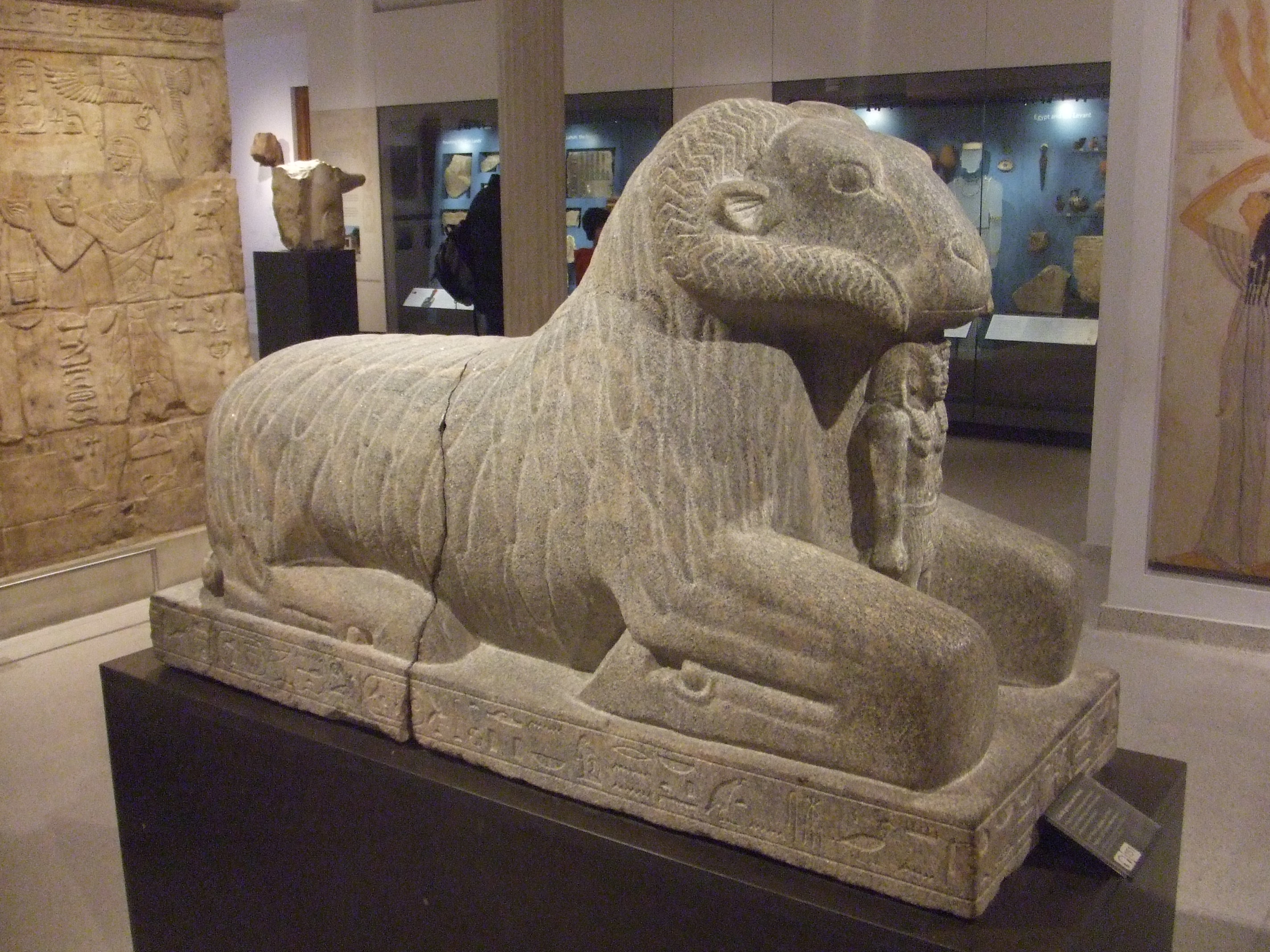
The Ram-Spinx and Taharqa

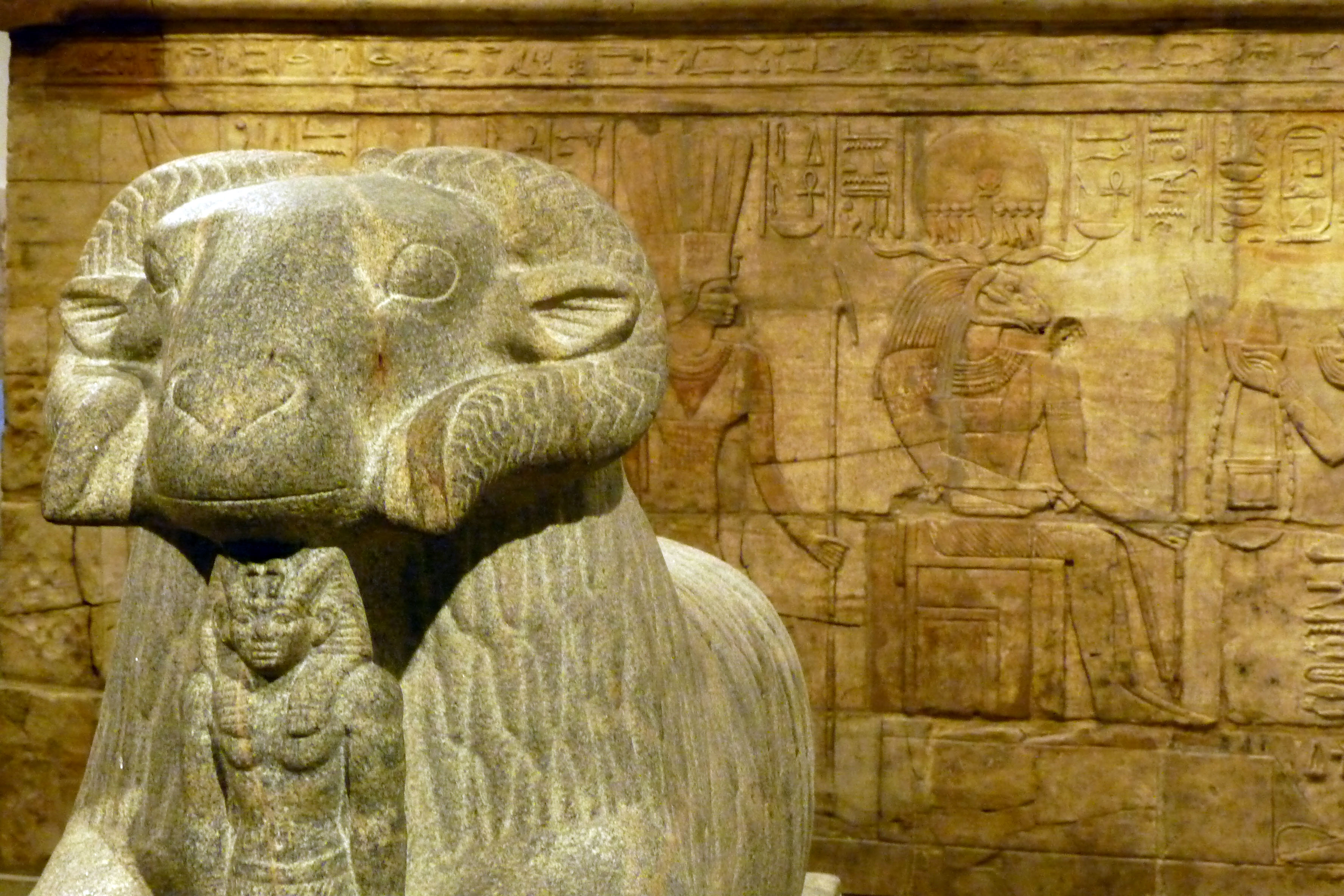
Close-up

== The Khartoum statue ==
The third statue is displayed in the yard of the National Museum of Sudan, Khartoum.

== See also ==
- Sphinx of Taharqo

== Reading ==
- Mysliwiec, Karol Royal Portraiture of the Dynasties XXI-XXX, 1988, pp. 33, 40.
- Amenophis III, Le Pharaon-Soleil,(Catalogue de l'exposition de 1993 au Grand Palais, Paris 1993) Paris, 1993, p. 184 [Fig.[31]a].
- Paul T. Nicholson and Ian Shaw (eds), Ancient Egyptian Materials and Technology (Cambridge 2000), p. 34
- "S. R. K. G.", "Granite Ram from the Sudan" British Museum Quarterly 8, online at
