= Siege of Lachish =

Neo-Assyrian Empire's siege and conquest of the town of Lachish in 701 BC

- Part of Sennacherib's campaign in the Levant
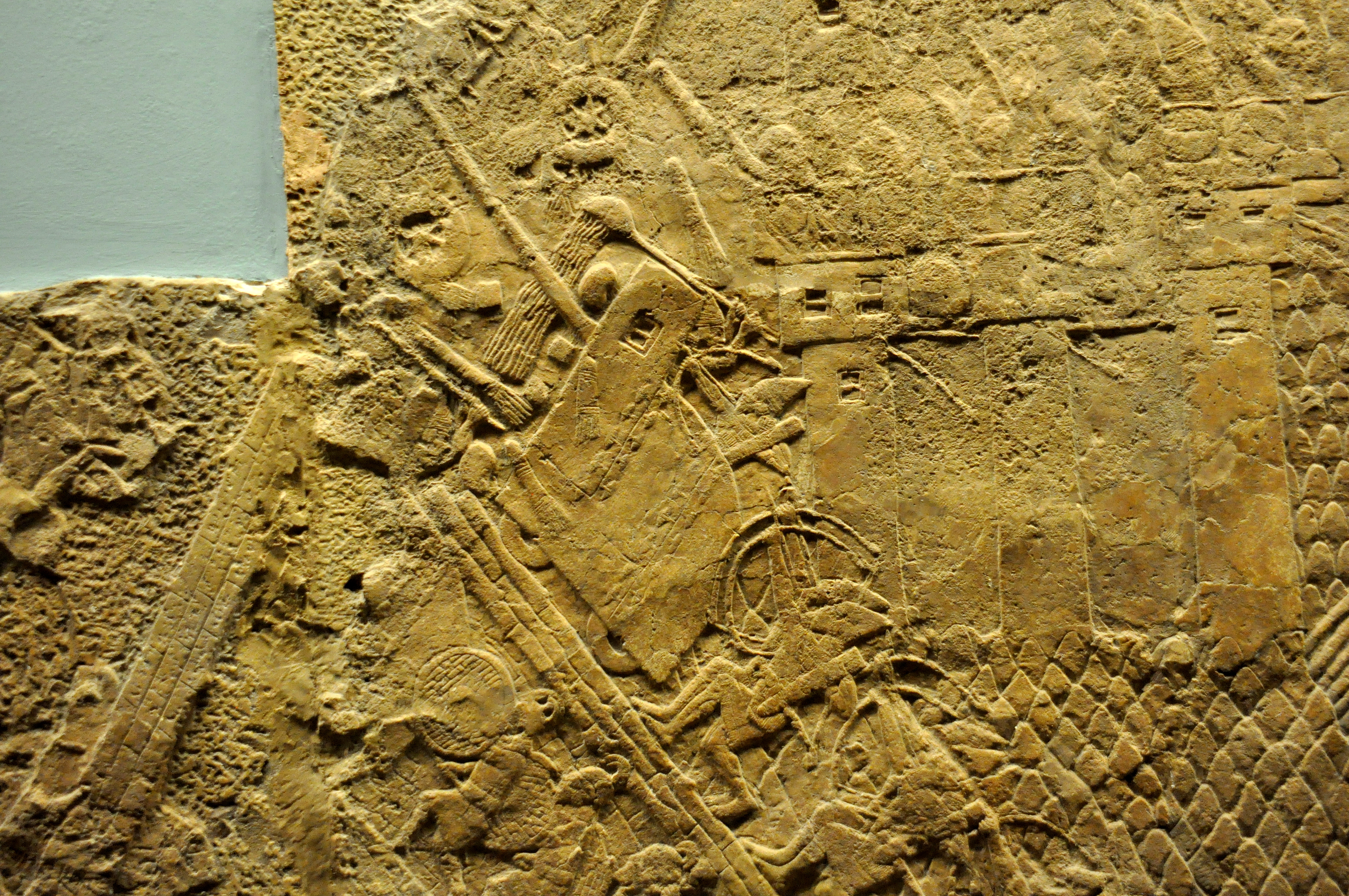
- Assyrian siege-engine attacking the city wall of Lachish, part of the ascending assaulting wave. Detail of a wall relief dating back to the reign of Sennacherib, 700-692 BC. From Nineveh, Iraq, currently housed in the British Museum.
Date	701 BC
Location	Lachish, Kingdom of Judah
Result	Assyrian victory; Lachish captured

Belligerents
Neo-Assyrian Empire	Kingdom of Judah

Commanders and leaders
Sennacherib	Unknown

Strength
Unknown	Unknown

Casualties and losses
Unknown	Heavy

The siege of Lachish was the Neo-Assyrian Empire's siege and conquest of the town of Lachish in 701 BC. The siege is documented in several sources including the Hebrew Bible, Assyrian documents and in the Lachish relief, a well-preserved series of reliefs which once decorated the Assyrian king Sennacherib's palace at Nineveh.

== Background ==
Several kingdoms in the Levant ceased to pay taxes to the Assyrian king Sennacherib. In retribution, he initiated a campaign to re-subjugate the rebelling kingdoms, among them the Kingdom of Judah. After defeating the rebels of Ekron in Philistia, Sennacherib set out to conquer Judah and, on his way to Jerusalem, came across Lachish: the second most important of the Jewish cities.

== Battlefield ==
The battlefield was the walled city of Lachish, situated on a hill. The northern part of the hill is steeper than the southern side and due to that the gate is situated there. On top of the fact that the hill as of itself is quite high, the wall further makes the city hard to breach. Inside the city itself there was a castle with significant walls.

== Forces of each side ==
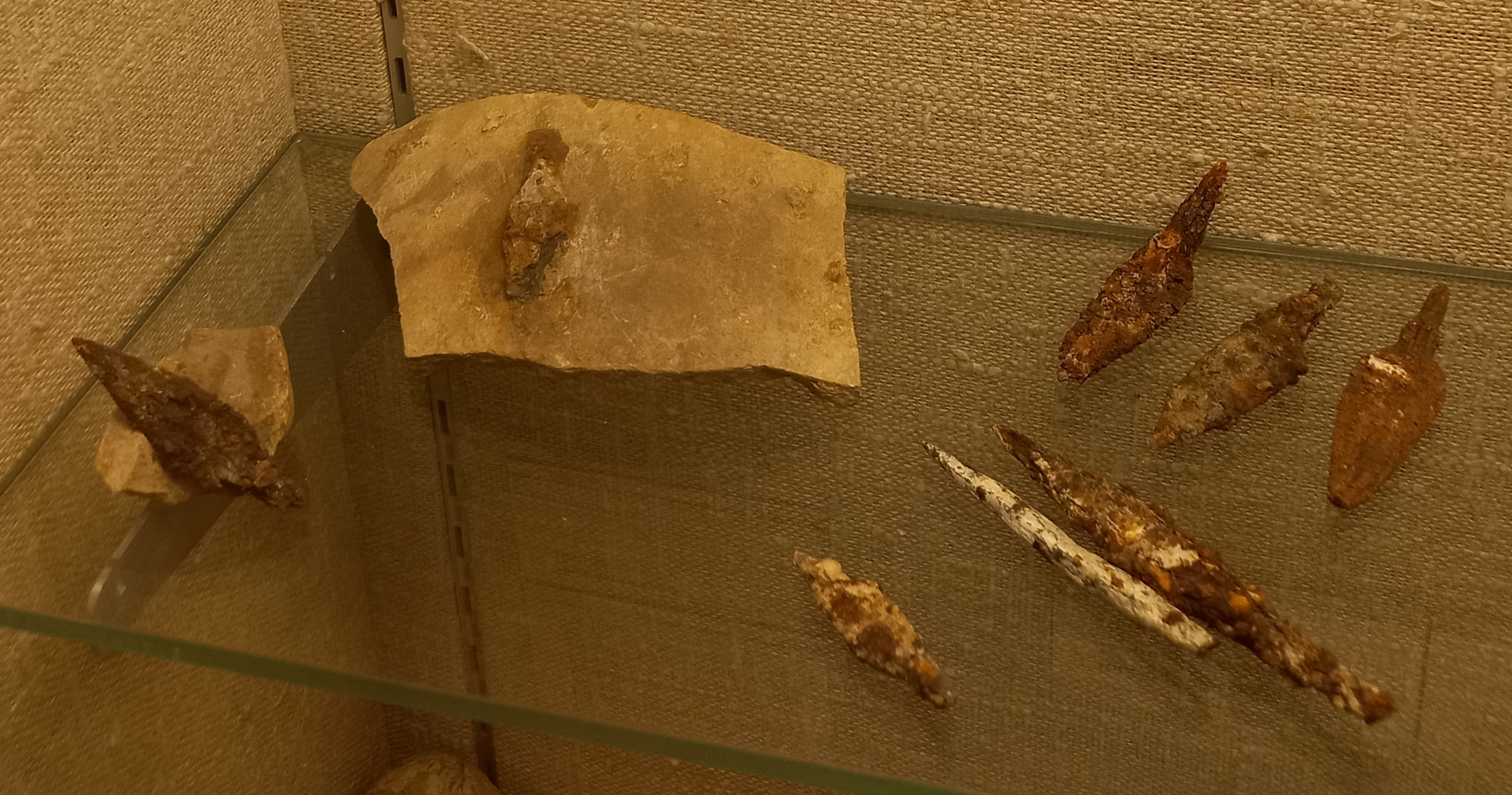
Assyrian arrowheads Lachish, British Museum.

=== Assyrian army ===
The Assyrian Army was the most effective force of its time and was divided mostly into three different categories:

- Infantry, which included both close-combat troops using spears, and archers. There were also hired mercenaries throwing stones (slingers). The infantry was highly trained and worked alongside military engineers in order to breach sieges.
- Cavalry; Assyrian cavalry were among the finest in the ancient Middle East and included both close-combat cavalry units with spears and mounted archers, which could both use the agility of the horses alongside long-range attacks.
- Chariots, which were not used as much in sieges as in regular land engagements.

=== Judean army ===
The Judean military force was insignificant compared to the professional and massive Assyrian army and mostly included local militias and mercenaries. There were barely any cavalrymen and chariots in the Judean army which mostly included infantry, either for close combat (spearmen) or long range combat (archers), they were also significantly less organized. (This section doesn’t provide any historical sources to support their claims.)

== Siege ==
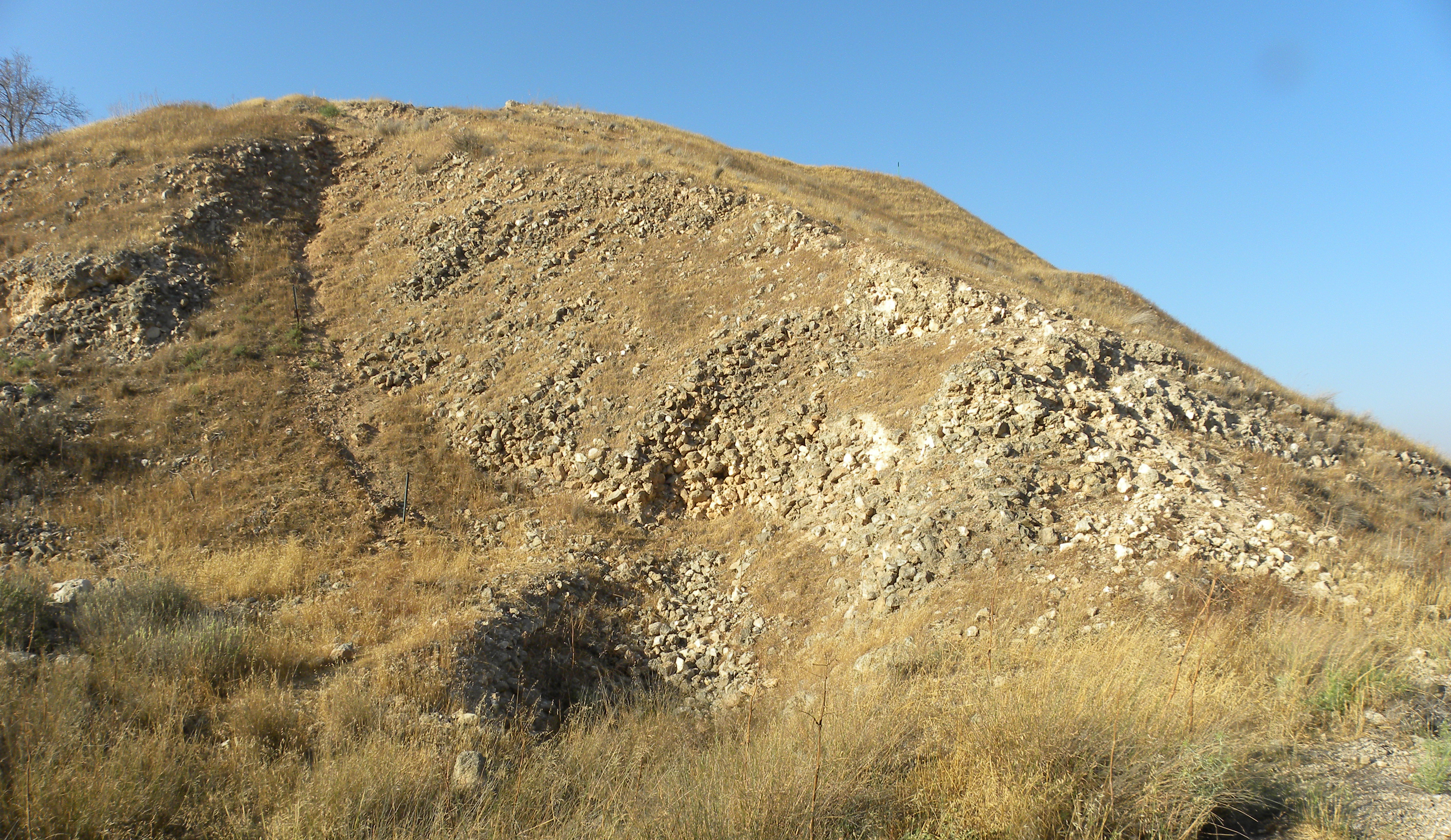
Assyrian siege ramp

Due to the steepness of the northern side of Lachish the Assyrian Army attacked from the south, where the Jewish defenders situated themselves on the walls. The Jewish defenders threw stones and shot arrows at the advancing Assyrians; the Assyrians started shooting arrows and stones themselves, creating a skirmish between the two armies. Meanwhile, Assyrian military engineers built a ramp to the east of the main gate where Assyrian and Jewish troops began engaging in close combat. The Assyrians meanwhile brought siege engines to the ramp and broke the wall; the Jewish defenders could not hold the Assyrian army and retreated, with some attempting to escape from the other side of the hill.

=== Subjugation ===
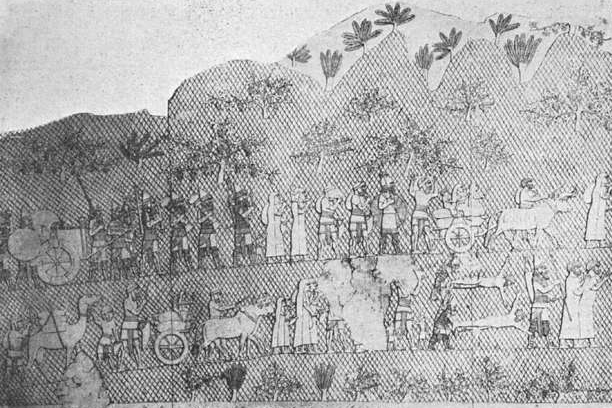
Judean captives being led away into slavery by the Assyrians after the siege of Lachish in 701 B.C. This relief is important for the knowledge of Judean dress.

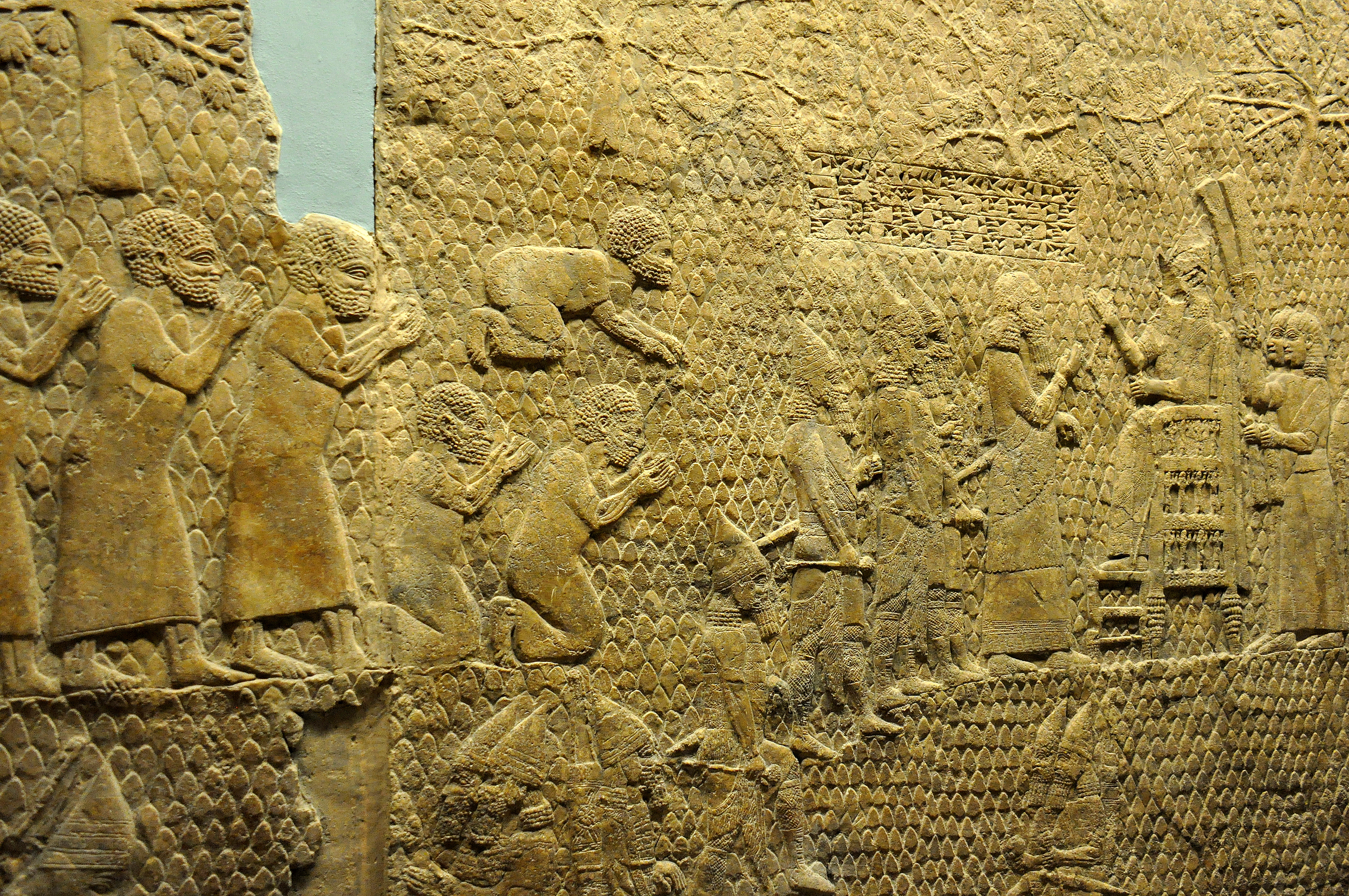
The fall of Lachish, King Sennacherib reviews Judaean prisoners.

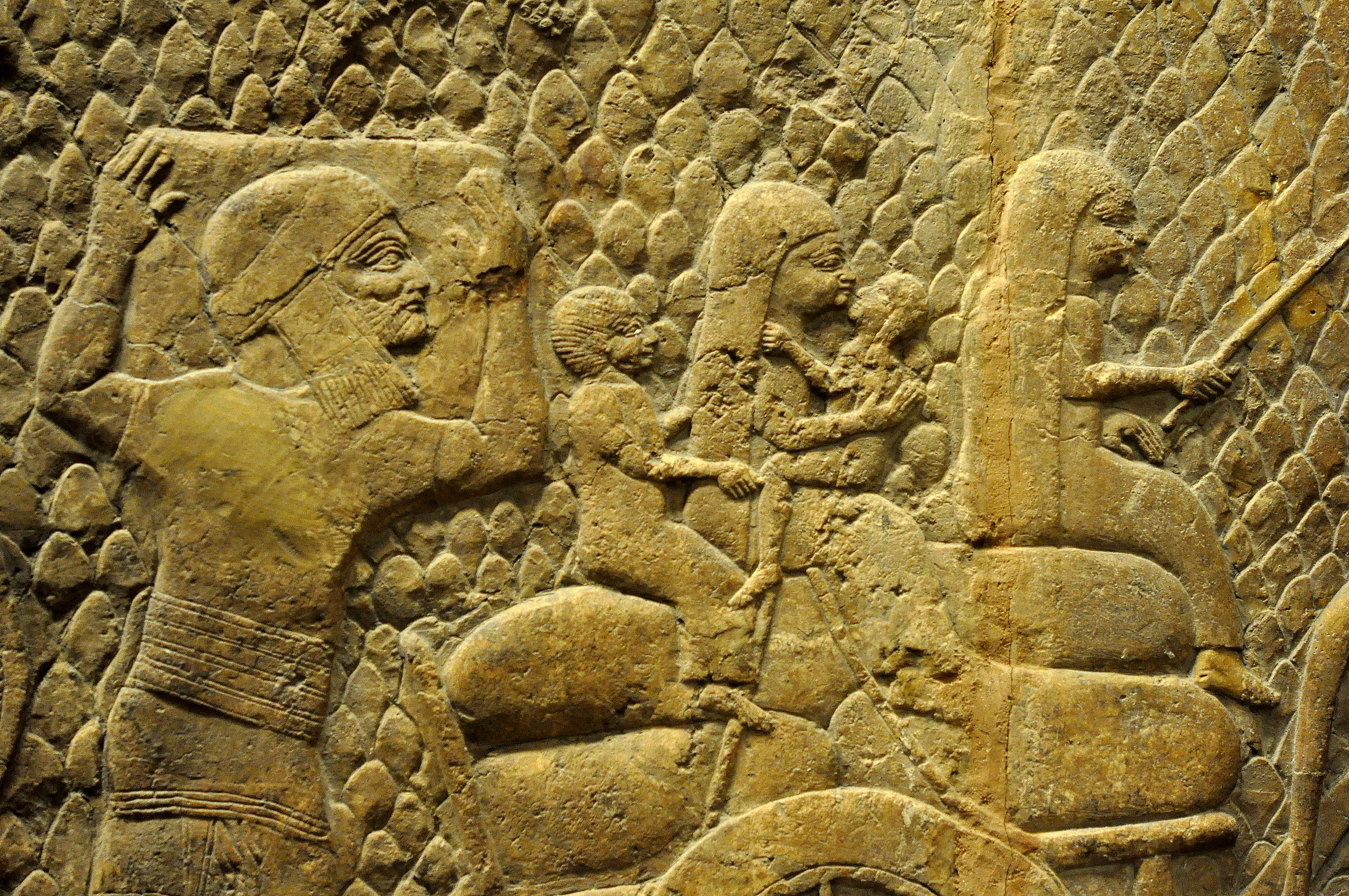
Judaean people being deported into exile after the capture of Lachish

The city was captured by the Assyrians, its inhabitants led into captivity and the leaders of Lachish tortured to death. The town was abandoned, but resettled after the return from Babylonia.

Assyrian reliefs portraying the siege of Lachish clearly show battering rams attacking the vulnerable parts of the city.

The siege and capture of the town of Lachish, one of the fortress towns protecting the approaches to Jerusalem, is unique in that it is mentioned in the Hebrew Bible (II Kings 18; II Chronicles 32)( MICAH 1:13 ) and in the Annals of the Assyrian king, Sennacherib. Not only that but the event is depicted on the walls of Sennacherib’s palace at Nineveh.

The British Museum has a superb set of relief carvings which depicted the siege in some detail. It shows the Assyrian soldiers firing arrows, and slingstones, and approaching the walls of Lachish using mudbrick ramps. The attackers shelter behind wicker shields, and deploy battering rams. The walls and towers of Lachish are shown crowded with defenders shooting arrows, throwing rocks and torches on the heads of the attackers.

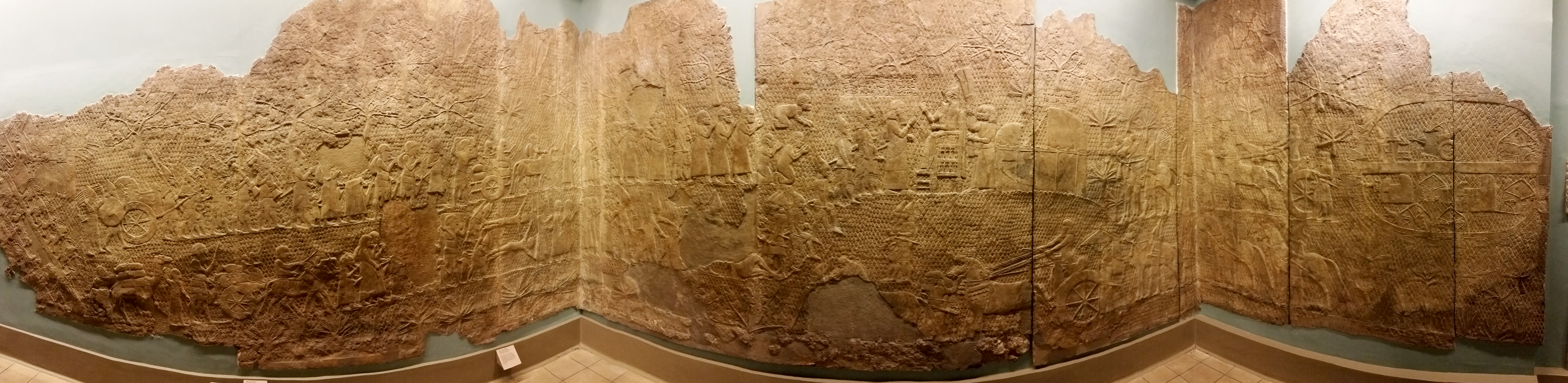
Siege of Lachish Relief in the British Museum.

The captions for the relief at the British Museum say:

Booty from Lachish" Assyrian, about 700-692 BC

From Nineveh, South West Palace,

Room XXXVI, Panels 8-9

After the capture of Lachish, Assyrian soldiers carry off plunder from the governor's palace: a bundle of scimitars, round shields, a chariot, a throne, and a pair of incense-burners. Below, Judean prisoners move in families, taking their goods and animals with them into exile."

Panels 9–10

The procession of prisoners from Lachish continues, moving through a rocky landscape with vines, fig trees, and perhaps olives in the background. Officials regarded as responsible for the rebellion against Assyria are treated more severely: two of them are being flayed alive.

Panels 11–13

Sennacherib, on a magnificent throne, watches as prisoners are brought before him and sometimes executed. There is a tent behind him, his chariot is in the foreground, and his bodyguard are stationed around. The King's face has been deliberately slashed, perhaps by an enemy soldier at the fall of Nineveh in 612 BC.

Panels 14–16

This panel, which closes the Lachish series, shows the base camp from which the siege was conducted. It is fortified, with a road through the middle. Servants are at work in tents, and two priests are performing a ceremony in front of the chariots on which are mounted the standards of the gods.

The reliefs continues showing the looting of the city, and defenders are shown being thrown over the ramparts, impaled, having their throats cut and asking for mercy. A bird's eye plan of the city is shown with house interiors shown in section.

== Aftermath ==
After he captured the second most important city in Judah, Sennacherib encamped there and then sent his Rabshakeh to capture Jerusalem.

== Cultural references ==
The Siege of Lachish is the subject of an eponymous song (and single) by metal band Melechesh.

== Ancient sources ==
- Lachish relief - A relief that was featured in Sennacherib's palace in Nineveh, it was identified by the text in it: "Sennacherib King of the Universe, King of Assyria, sits on a throne and the spoils of Lachish are paraded before him."

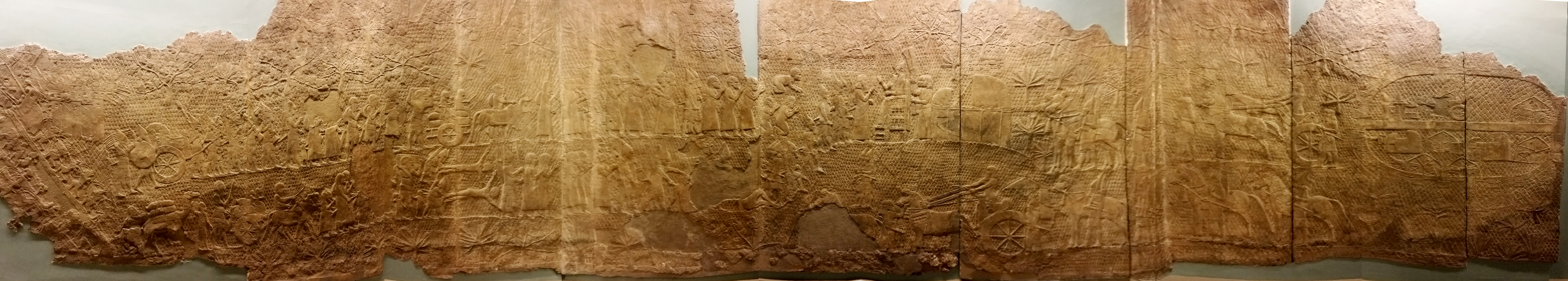
Siege of Lachish (701 BCE). Inscription: "Sennacherib King of the Universe, King of Assyria, sits on a throne and the spoils of Lachish are paraded before him." British Museum

Further sources for the conflict in general:

- Book of Kings
- Book of Isaiah
- Book of Chronicles
- Sennacherib's Prism
- Antiquities of the Jews, Titus Flavius Josephus

== See also ==
- List of artifacts significant to the Bible
- List of conflicts in the Near East
