= Muṣuri =

Moabite ruler

Muṣuri (Neo-Assyrian Akkadian: 𒁹𒈬𒀫𒄿, romanized: Muṣuri) was a ruler of Moab during the reigns of the Assyrian kings Esarhaddon (681-669 BCE) and Assurbanipal (669-c.627 BCE). His name may mean "the Egyptian." This name may simply be a given name or nickname; alternatively, it may be an indicator of his ethnicity (e.g., he may have been an Egyptian prince installed by the Assyrians, or his mother may have been an Egyptian wife or concubine of his predecessor on the Moabite throne). Another possibility is that he may have been given the name as a title during some campaign against Egypt (as with Roman names Germanicus, Britannicus, etc.).

He was likely succeeded by Kamas-halta, though the relationship between the two is unknown.
