= Lachish reliefs =

Assyrian palace reliefs

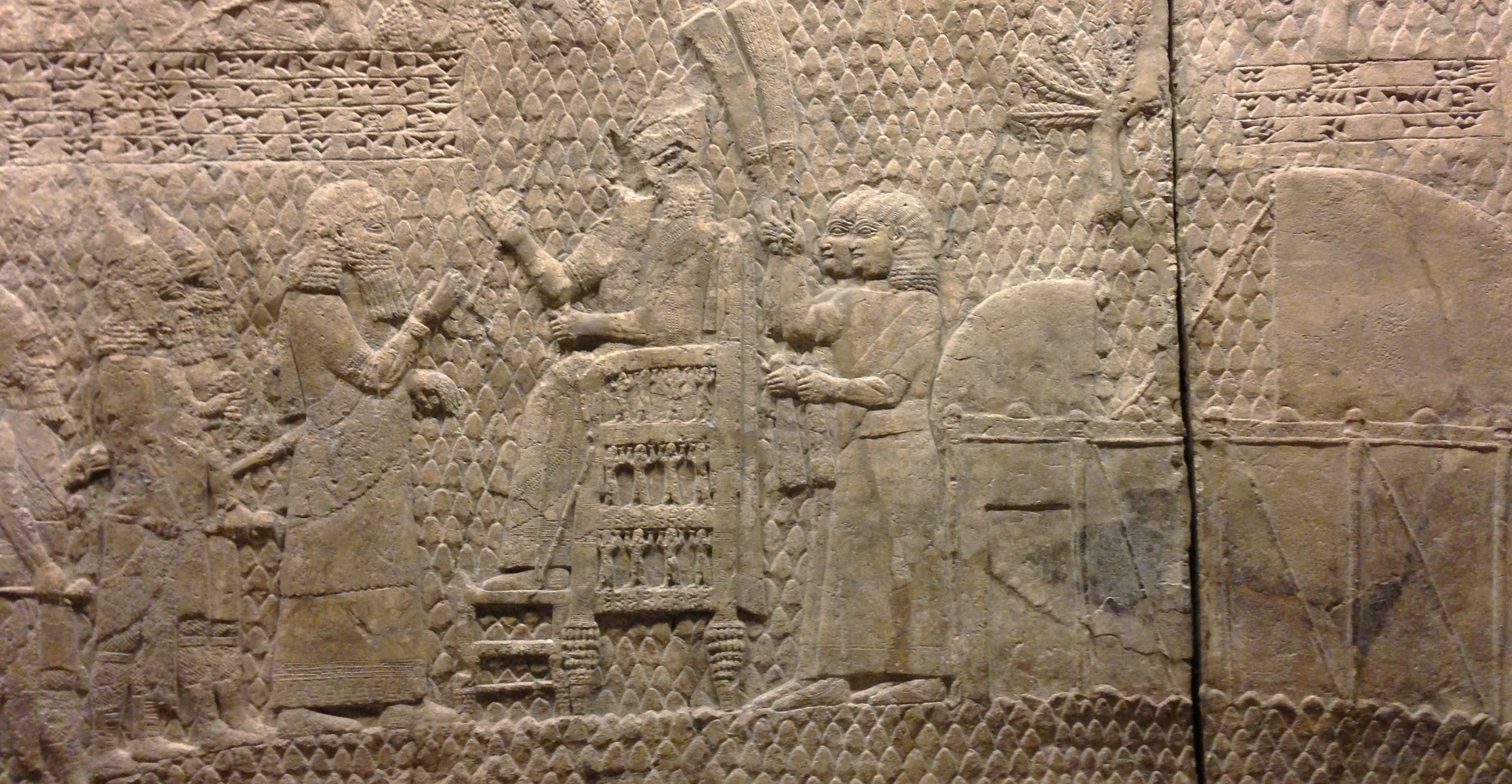
- The single inscription which identifies the location depicted in the reliefs reads: "Sennacherib, the mighty king, king of the country of Assyria, sitting on the throne of judgment, before (or at the entrance of) the city of Lachish (Lakhisha). I give permission for its slaughter". Identification number: BM 124911
- Height: 2.5 m (8 ft 2 in)
- Width: 18 m (59 ft)
- Created: c. 681 BC
- Discovered: c. 1847; 179 years ago Mosul, Nineveh, Ottoman Iraq
- Discovered by: Austen Layard
- Present location: London, United Kingdom

The Lachish reliefs are a set of Assyrian palace reliefs narrating the story of the Assyrian victory over the kingdom of Judah during the siege of Lachish in 701 BC. Carved between 700 and 681 BC, as a decoration of the South-West Palace of Sennacherib in Nineveh (in modern Iraq), the relief is today in the British Museum in London, and was included as item 21 in the BBC Radio 4 series A History of the World in 100 Objects by the museum's former director Neil MacGregor. The palace room, where the relief was discovered in 1845–1847, was fully covered with the "Lachish relief" and was 12 metres (39 ft) wide and 5.10 metres (16.7 ft) long. The Lion Hunt of Ashurbanipal sequence was found in the same palace.

== Identification ==
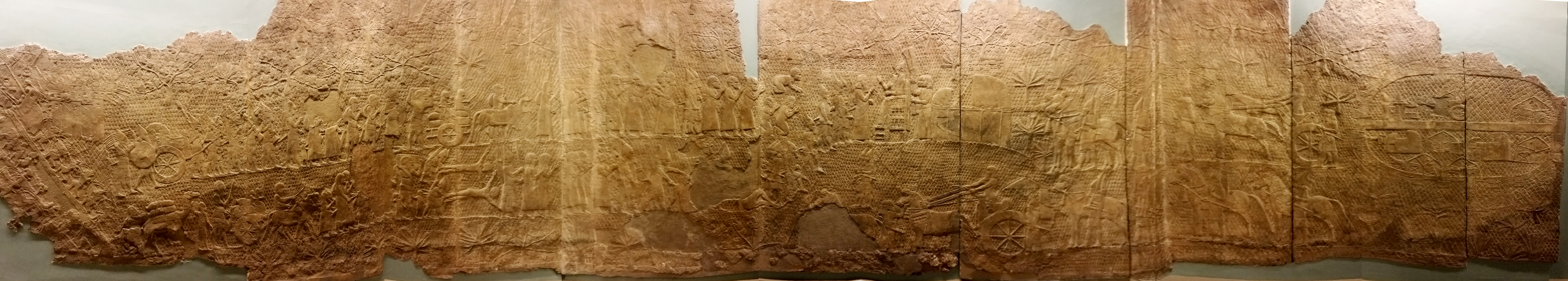
Siege of Lachish (701 BC). Inscription: "Sennacherib King of the Universe, King of Assyria, sits on a throne and the spoils of Lachish are paraded before him." British Museum

The reliefs were discovered by the then 28-year-old Austen Henry Layard during excavations in 1845–1847. Commenting on the inscription above the seated figure of Sennacherib, Layard wrote:

Here, therefore, was the actual picture of the taking of Lachish, the city as we know from the Bible, besieged by Sennacherib, when he sent his generals to demand tribute of Hezekiah, and which he had captured before their return; evidence of the most remarkable character to confirm the interpretation of the inscriptions, and to identify the king who caused them to be engraved with the Sennacherib of Scripture. This highly interesting series of bas-reliefs contained, moreover, an undoubted representation of a king, a city, and a people, with whose names we are acquainted, and of an event described in Holy Writ.

— Austen Henry Layard, Discoveries Among the Ruins of Nineveh and Babylon, 1853,

Layard noted in his work that Henry Rawlinson, the "Father of Assyriology", disagreed with the identification as the biblical Lachish. Rawlinson had written in 1852: "At the same time, it is hardly possible that the capture of Lakitsu, which is figured in the most elaborate manner on the walls of Sennacherib's palace at Nineveh, can refer to this city, as the two names are written quite differently in the Cuneiform characters." Layard and others refuted Rawlinson's identification, and the identification as the biblical Lachish prevailed.

Israeli researcher Yigael Yadin showed that the images of the walls and town depicted fit with the uncovered walls and town as seen from a certain point near the Tel Lachish digs. The descriptions shown in the reliefs were compared with those written about Lachish in the bible and found to be similar as well.

== Description ==
The Lachish reliefs represent "the most elaborate set of reliefs depicting a siege of a city" produced by any Assyrian monarch. According to archaeologist David Ussishkin, while the artistic style follows the schematic traditions of the Neo-Assyrian Empire, the reliefs provide an uncharacteristically detailed view of the city's fortification and the exile of its inhabitants.

The narrative structure of the relief series is divided into two distinct temporal phases that meet at Lachish's central city gate: the military assault is depicted on the left, while the right side shows the removal of booty and the deportation of Lachish's residents. The artist utilized a specific spatial hierarchy where the city structures and siege ramp are rendered on a smaller scale compared to the human figures on either side, thereby focusing the viewer's attention on the fate of the people.

Within the central siege scene, three prisoners are shown impaled naked on stakes at the bottom of the roadway, a location chosen to ensure all departing exiles witnessed this brutal display of Assyrian power. A separate group of two men is shown being tortured. One is being stabbed by an Assyrian soldier, while the other two are being flayed alive. One of the impaled victims is distinguished by the tallest stake and the presence of a helmet plume, which likely identifies him as the military governor or commander of Lachish.

The reliefs make a clear iconographic distinction between the general population, shown as families with their belongings, and those who are singled out for torture and execution, perhaps for taking an important role in the resistance. The deported inhabitants are depicted in a continuous procession that descends from the city gate and winds along the base of the siege ramp. This line of exiles eventually reaches the right-hand side of the relief, where it joins a procession of soldiers presenting booty before Sennacherib, who is shown enthroned on a hill.

A procession of nine Assyrian soldiers is shown carrying away items that served as symbols of the kingdom of Judah, including the governor's throne, his official chariot, and a ceremonial mace. These objects, including large ceremonial chalices, likely originated from the city's palace-fort rather than a religious sanctuary, as no archaeological evidence for a central shrine has been found at the site. The imagery of impalement and the seizure of state symbols served to communicate the total collapse of the independence of the kingdom of Judah.

== Interpretation ==
=== Lachish ===
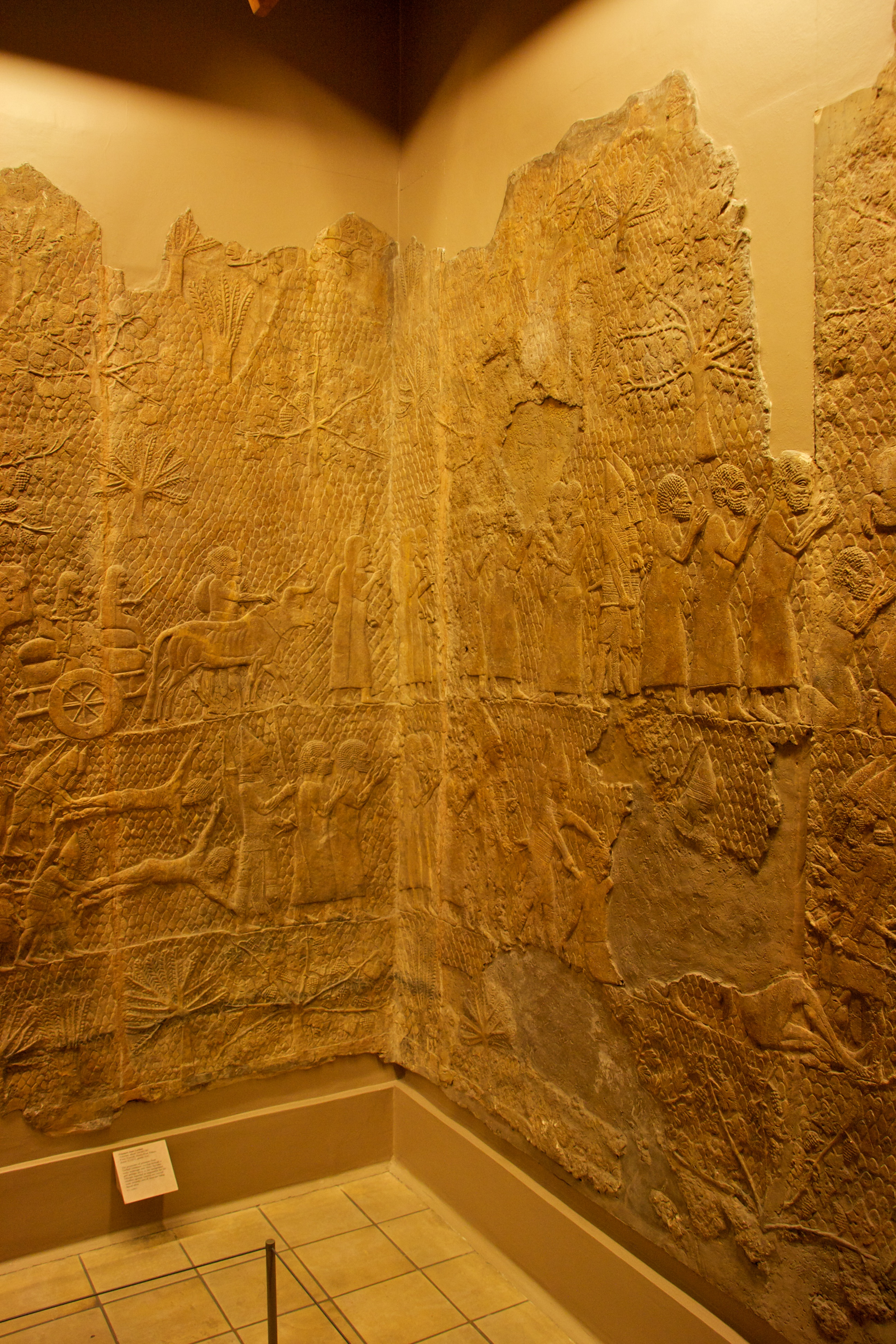
Lachish Relief, British Museum

The events surrounding the conquest of Lachish are recorded in an unparalleled number of sources for the 8th century BC; in the Hebrew Bible, the Lachish reliefs, Assyrian cuneiform prisms and in the archeological excavations at Lachish. Sennacherib's conquests of Judean cities, without the capital Jerusalem, are mentioned in the Bible, the Book of Kings, Book of Chronicles, and in the Book of Isaiah.

"Later, when Sennacherib king of Assyria and all his forces were laying siege to Lachish, he sent his officers to Jerusalem with this message for Hezekiah king of Judah and for all the people of Judah who were there." – (2 Chronicles 32:9)

"Now it came to pass in the fourteenth year of King Hezekiah that Sennacherib king of Assyria came up against all the fortified cities of Judah and took them." – (Isaiah 36:1–2)

In his annals, Sennacherib claimed that he destroyed 46 fortified cities and towns of Judah and took 200,150 captives, although the number of captives is seen today widely as exaggeration. He also claimed that he besieged King Hezekiah of Judah in Jerusalem "like a bird in a cage."

=== Jerusalem ===
Grabbe and other scholars today consider the city pictured on the Lachish relief to be Jerusalem. They point out that since Jerusalem was not captured by the Assyrians, the artist from Nineveh who carved the relief "added simply Lakisu instead of "Ursalimmu"" (Jerusalem). Other authors point out that the siege of Jerusalem is not depicted on the Lachish relief because it resulted in failure and the relief was seen as a way of compensation for not conquering Jerusalem. The size of the relief, its position in the central room of his palace, and the fact that the Lachish relief constitutes the only battle scene created by Sennacherib, indicate the importance he gave to this successful siege and presumed victory over Judah.

== See also ==
- Lachish ewer
- Lachish letters
- Sennacherib's Annals
- List of artifacts significant to the Bible

== Bibliography ==
- Grabbe, Lester (2003). Like a Bird in a Cage: The Invasion of Sennacherib in 701 BCE. Continuum International Publishing Group. ISBN 9780826462152.
- Evans, Paul (2009). The Invasion of Sennacherib in the Book of Kings: A Source-Critical and Rhetorical Study of 2 Kings 18-19. IDC Publisher. ISBN 978-9004175969.
- Finkelstein, Israel (2007). The Quest for the Historical Israel: Debating Archaeology and the History of Early Israel: Invited Lectures Delivered at the Sixth Biennial Colloquium. Society of Biblical literature. ISBN 9781589832770.
- Nelson, Thomas (1999). The King James study Bible. Liberty University. ISBN 9781418589141.
- Ussishkin, David (2003). "Symbols of conquest in Sennacherib's reliefs of Lachish: impaled prisoners and booty". In Potts, T. (ed.). Culture through Objects. Ancient Near Eastern Studies in Honour of P.R.S. Moorey. Oxford University. pp. 207–217.

Preceded by 20: Statue of Ramesses II	A History of the World in 100 Objects; Object 21	Succeeded by 22: Sphinx of Taharqa
