= Ezekiel 30 =

Book of Ezekiel, chapter 30

- ← chapter 29 chapter 31 →
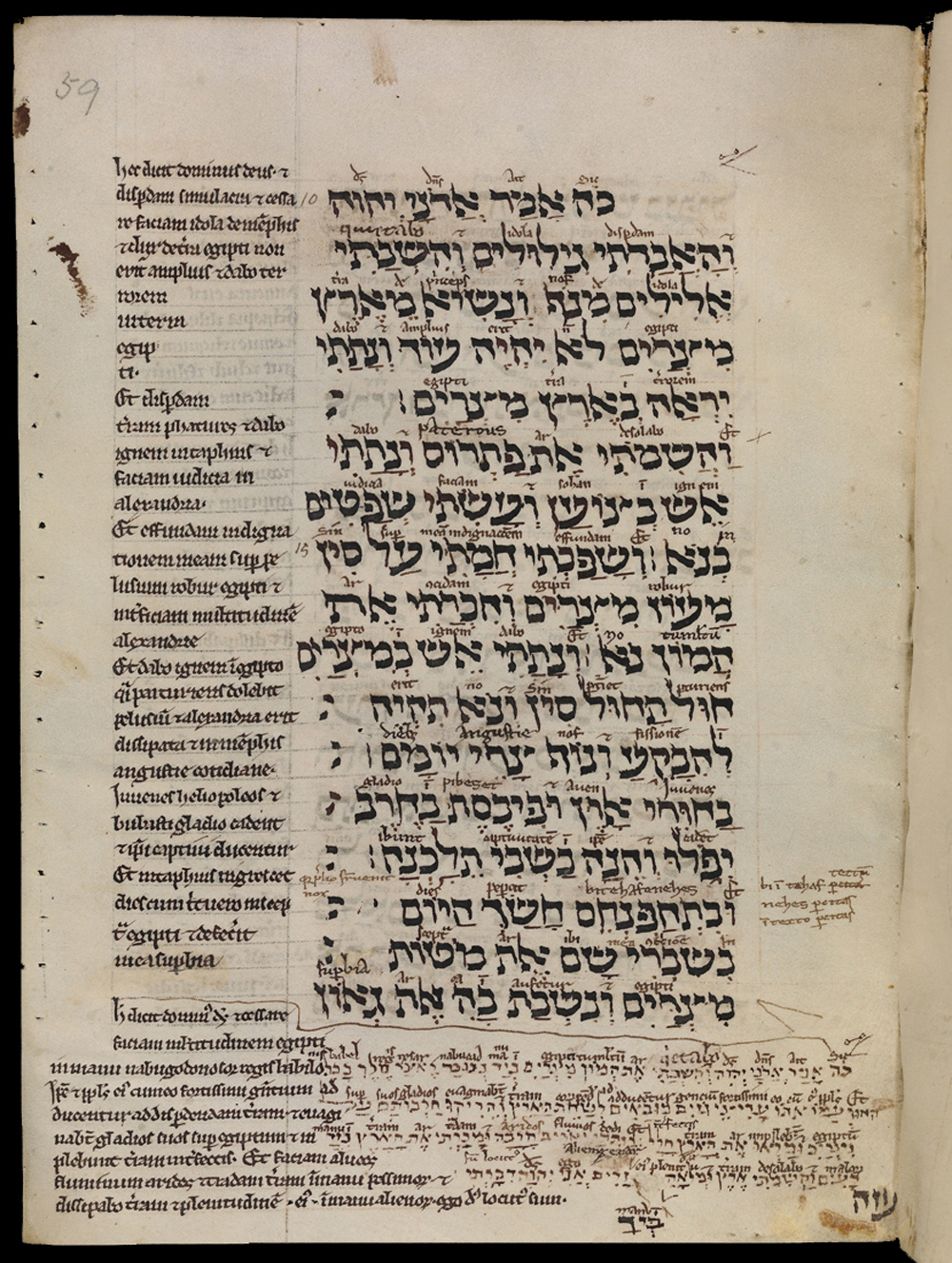
- Book of Ezekiel 30:13–18 in an English manuscript from the early 13th century, MS. Bodl. Or. 62, fol. 59a. A Latin translation appears in the margins with further interlineations above the Hebrew.
- Book: Book of Ezekiel
- Hebrew Bible part: Nevi'im
- Order in the Hebrew part: 7
- Category: Latter Prophets
- Christian Bible part: Old Testament
- Order in the Christian part: 26

Ezekiel 30 is the thirtieth chapter of the Book of Ezekiel in the Hebrew Bible or the Old Testament of the Christian Bible. This book contains the prophecies attributed to the prophet/priest Ezekiel, and is one of the Books of the Prophets. Biblical commentator Susan Galambush observes that Chapters 29–32 contain seven oracles against Egypt, balancing the seven oracles against Israel's smaller neighbors in chapters 25–28. Andrew Davidson divides this chapter into two prophecies, "the first of which, verses 1-19, in all probability belongs to the same date as Ezekiel 29:1–16, that is, about seven months before the fall of Jerusalem; and the second, verses 20-26, is dated four months before the capture of the city".

== Text ==
The original text was written in the Hebrew language. This chapter is divided into 26 verses.

=== Textual witnesses ===
Some early manuscripts containing the text of this chapter in Hebrew are of the Masoretic Text tradition, which includes the Codex Cairensis (895), the Petersburg Codex of the Prophets (916), Aleppo Codex (10th century), Codex Leningradensis (1008).

There is also a translation into Koine Greek known as the Septuagint, made in the last few centuries BC. Extant ancient manuscripts of the Septuagint version include Codex Vaticanus (B; $\mathfrak{G}$^{B}; 4th century), Codex Alexandrinus (A; $\mathfrak{G}$^{A}; 5th century) and Codex Marchalianus (Q; $\mathfrak{G}$^{Q}; 6th century). (Note: Ezekiel is missing from the extant Codex Sinaiticus.)

== The Day of YHWH against Egypt (30:1–19) ==
This group of verses records the oracle of YHWH's judgement on Egypt in three sections:

1. Verses 1–5: YHWH announces that the day of YHWH (cf. Ezekiel 7:10) has come for Egypt, as his sword will be unsheathed and Egypt will be utterly destroyed.
2. Verses 6–12, the oracle's central section: describes King Nebuchadrezzar of Babylon (verse 10) as the instrument by which YHWH devastates Egypt.
3. Verses 13–19, final section: lists the cities to be vanquished during a successful military campaign, presenting YHWH as the "Divine Warrior" who conquers them (in the manner of ancient Near Eastern monarchs publishing their conquest list).

=== Verse 2 ===
"Son of man, prophesy and say, 'Thus says the Lord God:

"Wail, ‘Woe to the day!'"

- "Son of man" (Hebrew: בן־אדם ḇen-’ā-ḏām): this phrase is used 93 times to address Ezekiel.
- "Woe" (Hebrew: הָהּ hāh): "alas!"; an interjection of sorrow.

=== Verse 6 ===
Thus says the Lord:
Indeed, those who uphold Egypt shall fall,

and the pride of her power shall come down.

From Migdol to Syene

they shall fall in her by the sword,

says the Lord God.

- "Migdol" or "the tower"

== Pharaoh's broken arm and Nebuchadrezzar's strong arm (30:20–26) ==
In the second oracle, recorded in this section, YHWH repeats his condemnations of Pharaoh (cf. chapter 29) and his announcement of placing 'his own divine sword in Nebuchadnezzar's hand' (cf. 30:10—11; chapter 21). The date of this oracle (verse 20), as also stated in Ezekiel 29:1, places the arrival of this prophecy after Apries's withdrawal from Jerusalem, where YHWH claims to have already broken one of Pharaoh's arms and would soon 'shatter the other', while in contrast YHwH would strengthen Nebuchadnezzar's arms with YHWH's own sword, so all nations would 'acknowledge the sovereignty of YHWH'.

=== Verse 20 ===
And it came to pass in the eleventh year, in the first month, on the seventh day of the month, that the word of the Lord came to me, saying,

The date corresponds to April 29, 587 BCE, based on an analysis by German theologian Bernhard Lang.

=== Verse 21 ===
"Son of man, I have broken the arm of Pharaoh king of Egypt;
and see, it has not been bandaged for healing, nor a splint put on to bind it,
to make it strong enough to hold a sword."

- "Pharaoh" (Hebrew: פרעה par-‘ōh; Egyptian: pr-±o, "great house"; Greek: Φαραω, Pharao): the title of ancient Egyptian kings, of royal court, and (in new kingdom) of the king, until the Persian invasion.

== See also ==
- Aven
- Babylon
- Battle of Carchemish
- Egypt
- Ethiopia
- Libya
- Lydia
- Migdol
- Nebuchadnezzar
- No
- Noph
- Pathros
- Pharaoh
- Pi Beseth
- Sin
- Syene
- Tehaphnehes
- Zoan
- Related Bible parts: Isaiah 30, Jeremiah 44, Ezekiel 17, Ezekiel 29

== Bibliography ==
- Bromiley, Geoffrey W. (1995). International Standard Bible Encyclopedia: vol. iv, Q-Z. Eerdmans. ISBN 9780802837844.
- Brown, Francis; Briggs, Charles A.; Driver, S. R. (1994). The Brown-Driver-Briggs Hebrew and English Lexicon (reprint ed.). Hendrickson Publishers. ISBN 978-1565632066.
- Clements, Ronald E (1996). Ezekiel. Westminster John Knox Press. ISBN 9780664252724.
- Galambush, J. (2007). "25. Ezekiel". In Barton, John; Muddiman, John (eds.). The Oxford Bible Commentary (first (paperback) ed.). Oxford University Press. pp. 533–562. ISBN 978-0199277186.
- Gesenius, H. W. F. (1979). Gesenius' Hebrew and Chaldee Lexicon to the Old Testament Scriptures: Numerically Coded to Strong's Exhaustive Concordance, with an English Index. Translated by Tregelles, Samuel Prideaux (7th ed.). Baker Book House.
- Joyce, Paul M. (2009). Ezekiel: A Commentary. Continuum. ISBN 9780567483614.
- Kee, Howard Clark; Meyers, Eric M.; Rogerson, John; Levine, Amy-Jill; Saldarini, Anthony J. (2008). Chilton, Bruce (ed.). The Cambridge Companion to the Bible (2, revised ed.). Cambridge University Press. ISBN 9780521691406.
- Würthwein, Ernst (1995). The Text of the Old Testament. Translated by Rhodes, Erroll F. Grand Rapids, MI: Wm. B. Eerdmans. ISBN 0-8028-0788-7.
