= Ezekiel 28 =

Book of Ezekiel, chapter 28

- ← chapter 27 chapter 29 →
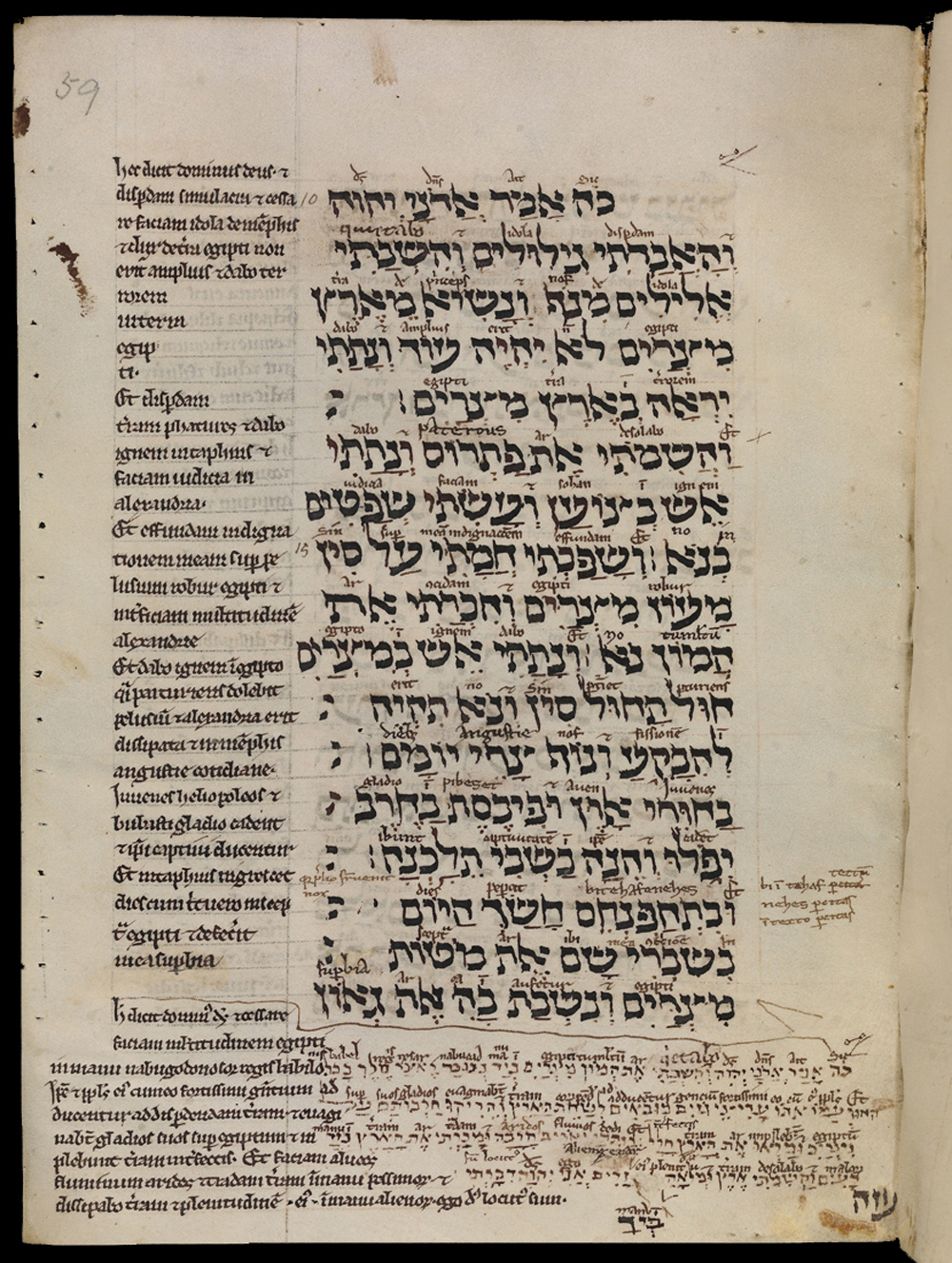
- Book of Ezekiel 30:13–18 in an English manuscript from the early 13th century, MS. Bodl. Or. 62, fol. 59a. A Latin translation appears in the margins with further interlineations above the Hebrew.
- Book: Book of Ezekiel
- Hebrew Bible part: Nevi'im
- Order in the Hebrew part: 7
- Category: Latter Prophets
- Christian Bible part: Old Testament
- Order in the Christian part: 26

Ezekiel 28 is the twenty-eighth chapter of the Book of Ezekiel in the Hebrew Bible or the Old Testament of the Christian Bible. This book contains the prophecies attributed to the prophet/priest Ezekiel, and is one of the Books of the Prophets. This chapter contains a prophecy against the king of Tyre and a prophecy against neighbouring Sidon, concluding with a promise that Israel will be "delivered from the nations".

== Text ==
The original text was written in the Hebrew language. This chapter is divided into 26 verses.

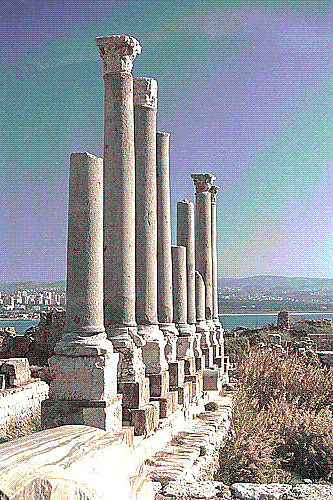
The ruins of Tyre

=== Textual witnesses ===
Some early manuscripts containing the text of this chapter in Hebrew are of the Masoretic Text tradition, which includes the Codex Cairensis (895), the Petersburg Codex of the Prophets (916), Aleppo Codex (10th century), Codex Leningradensis (1008).

There is also a translation into Koine Greek known as the Septuagint, made in the last few centuries BC. Extant ancient manuscripts of the Septuagint version include Codex Vaticanus (B; $\mathfrak{G}$^{B}; 4th century), Codex Alexandrinus (A; $\mathfrak{G}$^{A}; 5th century) and Codex Marchalianus (Q; $\mathfrak{G}$^{Q}; 6th century). (Note: Ezekiel is missing from the extant Codex Sinaiticus.)

== Against the Ruler of Tyre (28:1-19) ==
This part contains an oracle against the ruler (negid; "prince") of Tyre (verses 1–10) and a lament over the destruction of the king (melek) of Tyre (verses 11–19).

=== Verse 2 ===
""Son of man, say to the prince of Tyre,
‘Thus says the Lord God:

"Because your heart is lifted up,
And you say, 'I am a god'

I sit in the seat of gods,
In the midst of the seas',

Yet you are a man, and not a god,

Though you set your heart as the heart of a god"

- "Son of man" (Hebrew: בן־אדם): this phrase is used 93 times to address Ezekiel.
- "Prince" (נָגִיד): the Hebrew word has a meaning of "ruler", "leader" of people, tribal "chief", a nobleman. The "king" in verse 12 is referring to the same person. The leader of Tyre is judged for his pride and self-deification. During Ezekiel's time, this leader would have been the Tyrian king Ittobaal III.

=== Verse 3 ===
Are you wiser than Daniel?

Is no secret hidden from you?

The name "Daniel" may refer to Danel, "a man of renown in ancient literature" or King David's son Daniel. The text in the Jerusalem Bible reads:

You are now wiser than Daniel;

there is no sage as wise as you.

=== Verse 13 ===
You were in Eden, the garden of God;

every precious stone was your covering,

sardius, topaz, and diamond,

beryl, onyx, and jasper,

sapphire, emerald, and carbuncle;

and crafted in gold were your settings
and your engravings.

On the day that you were created

they were prepared.

- Cross reference: Ezekiel 31:9, 16, 18; 36:35.
- "Every precious stone was your covering": comparable to the stones in the "breastpiece of judgement" wore by the High Priest of Israel (cf. Exodus 28:17–20; 39:10–13).
- "Sapphire" (Hebrew: ספיר sapîr): "a kind of gem"; "lapis lazuli" (Exodus 24:10; Ezekiel 1:26).

== Against Sidon (28:20-23) ==
This section contains an oracle of Yahweh's judgement against Sidon, another member of the anti-Babylonian alliance (Jeremiah 27), but less important than Tyre, with the ultimate goal, repeated twice in this brief oracle, that they shall acknowledge Yahweh's sovereignty.

== Promises to Israel (28:24-26) ==
Following the oracles against Israel's neighbours, two promises are prophesied to Israel: (1) Israel will cease to be provoked by these neighbours (verse 24); (2) having punished Israel's neighbours, Yahweh will restore Israel to its land and his presence to Israel (verses 25–26).

== See also ==
- Danel
- Daniel (biblical figure)
- Eden
- Israel
- Jacob
- Sidon
- Ezekiel's cherub in Eden
- Tyre
- Related Bible passages: Genesis 3, Isaiah 14, Isaiah 23, Daniel 4, Acts 12, 2 Thessalonians 2

== Sources ==
- Bromiley, Geoffrey W. (1995). International Standard Bible Encyclopedia: vol. iv, Q-Z. Eerdmans. ISBN 9780802837844.
- Brown, Francis; Briggs, Charles A.; Driver, S. R. (1994). The Brown-Driver-Briggs Hebrew and English Lexicon (reprint ed.). Hendrickson Publishers. ISBN 978-1565632066.
- Clements, Ronald E (1996). Ezekiel. Westminster John Knox Press. ISBN 9780664252724.
- Coogan, Michael David (2007). Coogan, Michael David; Brettler, Marc Zvi; Newsom, Carol Ann; Perkins, Pheme (eds.). The New Oxford Annotated Bible with the Apocryphal/Deuterocanonical Books: New Revised Standard Version, Issue 48 (Augmented 3rd ed.). Oxford University Press. ISBN 9780195288810.
- Galambush, J. (2007). "25. Ezekiel". In Barton, John; Muddiman, John (eds.). The Oxford Bible Commentary (first (paperback) ed.). Oxford University Press. pp. 533–562. ISBN 978-0199277186.
- Gesenius, H. W. F. (1979). Gesenius' Hebrew and Chaldee Lexicon to the Old Testament Scriptures: Numerically Coded to Strong's Exhaustive Concordance, with an English Index. Translated by Tregelles, Samuel Prideaux (7th ed.). Baker Book House.
- Joyce, Paul M. (2009). Ezekiel: A Commentary. Continuum. ISBN 9780567483614.
- Würthwein, Ernst (1995). The Text of the Old Testament. Translated by Rhodes, Erroll F. Grand Rapids, MI: Wm. B. Eerdmans. ISBN 0-8028-0788-7.
