= Ezekiel 31 =

Book of Ezekiel, chapter 31

- ← chapter 30 chapter 32 →
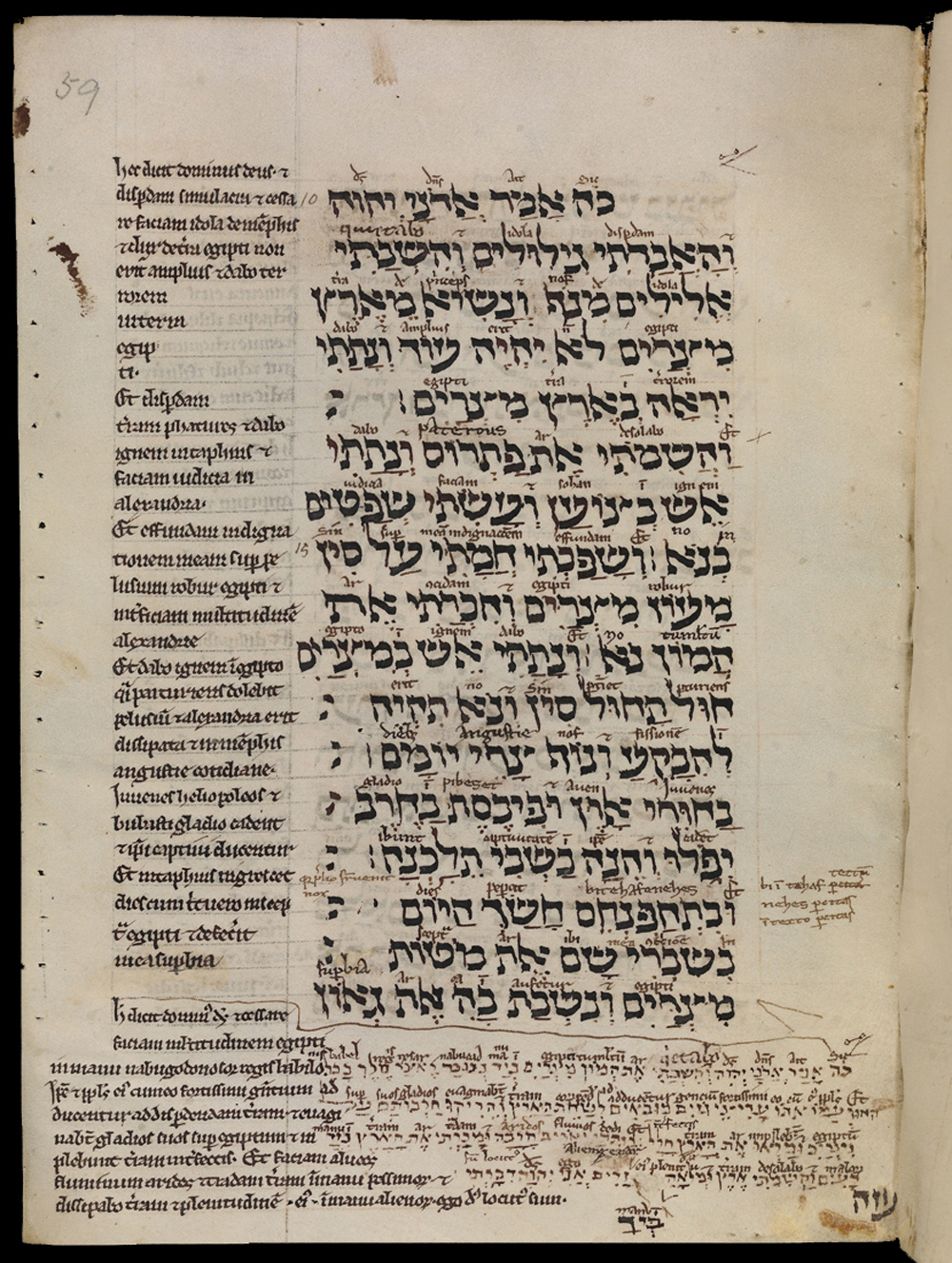
- Book of Ezekiel 30:13–18 in an English manuscript from the early 13th century, MS. Bodl. Or. 62, fol. 59a. A Latin translation appears in the margins with further interlineations above the Hebrew.
- Book: Book of Ezekiel
- Hebrew Bible part: Nevi'im
- Order in the Hebrew part: 7
- Category: Latter Prophets
- Christian Bible part: Old Testament
- Order in the Christian part: 26

Ezekiel 31 is the thirty-first chapter of the Book of Ezekiel in the Hebrew Bible or the Old Testament of the Christian Bible. This book contains the prophecies attributed to the prophet/priest Ezekiel, and is one of the Books of the Prophets. In the New King James Version, this chapter is sub-titled "Egypt Cut Down Like a Great Tree".

== Text ==
The original text was written in the Hebrew language. This chapter is divided into 18 verses.

=== Textual witnesses ===
Some early manuscripts containing the text of this chapter in Hebrew are of the Masoretic Text tradition, which includes the Codex Cairensis (895), the Petersburg Codex of the Prophets (916), Aleppo Codex (10th century), Codex Leningradensis (1008).

There is also a translation into Koine Greek known as the Septuagint, made in the last few centuries BC. Extant ancient manuscripts of the Septuagint version include Codex Vaticanus (B; $\mathfrak{G}$^{B}; 4th century), Codex Alexandrinus (A; $\mathfrak{G}$^{A}; 5th century) and Codex Marchalianus (Q; $\mathfrak{G}$^{Q}; 6th century). (Note: Ezekiel is missing from the extant Codex Sinaiticus.)

== Verse 1 ==
Now it came to pass in the eleventh year, in the third month, on the first day of the month, that the word of the Lord came to me, saying,

The date corresponds to June 21, 587 BCE, based on an analysis by German theologian Bernhard Lang, around 7 weeks after the proclamation against Egypt in Ezekiel 30:20–26.

== Verse 2 ==
"Son of man, say to Pharaoh king of Egypt and to his multitude:

‘Whom are you like in your greatness?’"

- "Son of man" (Hebrew: בן־אדם ḇen-’ā-ḏām): this phrase is used 93 times to address Ezekiel.
- "Pharaoh" (Hebrew: פרעה par-‘ōh; Egyptian: pr-±o, "great house"; Greek: Φαραω, Pharao): the title of ancient Egyptian kings, of royal court, and (in new kingdom) of the king, until the Persian invasion.

== Verse 3 ==
Indeed Assyria was a cedar in Lebanon,

With fine branches that shaded the forest,
And of high stature;
And its top was among the thick boughs.

Assyria was a superpower which fell into the hand of the Babylonians (see Nahum 3:8–10). In the New Living Translation, Assyria "was once like a cedar of Lebanon", making it clear that the reference to Lebanon is a metaphor, not a locational statement. and that Assyria's influence in the region had now waned.

Ezekiel anticipates that soon Egypt will fall likewise.

== Verse 8 ==
The cedars in the garden of God could not hide it;
The fir trees were not like its boughs,
And the chestnut trees were not like its branches;
No tree in the garden of God was like it in beauty.

The "garden of God" is the garden of Eden.

== See also ==
- Assyria
- Cedar
- Eden
- Egypt
- Lebanon
- Pharaoh
- Related Bible parts: Ezekiel 29, Ezekiel 30, Nahum 3

== Bibliography ==
- Bromiley, Geoffrey W. (1995). International Standard Bible Encyclopedia: vol. iv, Q-Z. Eerdmans. ISBN 9780802837844.
- Brown, Francis; Briggs, Charles A.; Driver, S. R. (1994). The Brown-Driver-Briggs Hebrew and English Lexicon (reprint ed.). Hendrickson Publishers. ISBN 978-1565632066.
- Clements, Ronald E (1996). Ezekiel. Westminster John Knox Press. ISBN 9780664252724.
- Gesenius, H. W. F. (1979). Gesenius' Hebrew and Chaldee Lexicon to the Old Testament Scriptures: Numerically Coded to Strong's Exhaustive Concordance, with an English Index. Translated by Tregelles, Samuel Prideaux (7th ed.). Baker Book House.
- Joyce, Paul M. (2009). Ezekiel: A Commentary. Continuum. ISBN 9780567483614.
- Kee, Howard Clark; Meyers, Eric M.; Rogerson, John; Levine, Amy-Jill; Saldarini, Anthony J. (2008). Chilton, Bruce (ed.). The Cambridge Companion to the Bible (2, revised ed.). Cambridge University Press. ISBN 9780521691406.
- Würthwein, Ernst (1995). The Text of the Old Testament. Translated by Rhodes, Erroll F. Grand Rapids, MI: Wm. B. Eerdmans. ISBN 0-8028-0788-7.
