= Ezekiel 32 =

Book of Ezekiel, chapter 32

- ← chapter 31 chapter 33 →
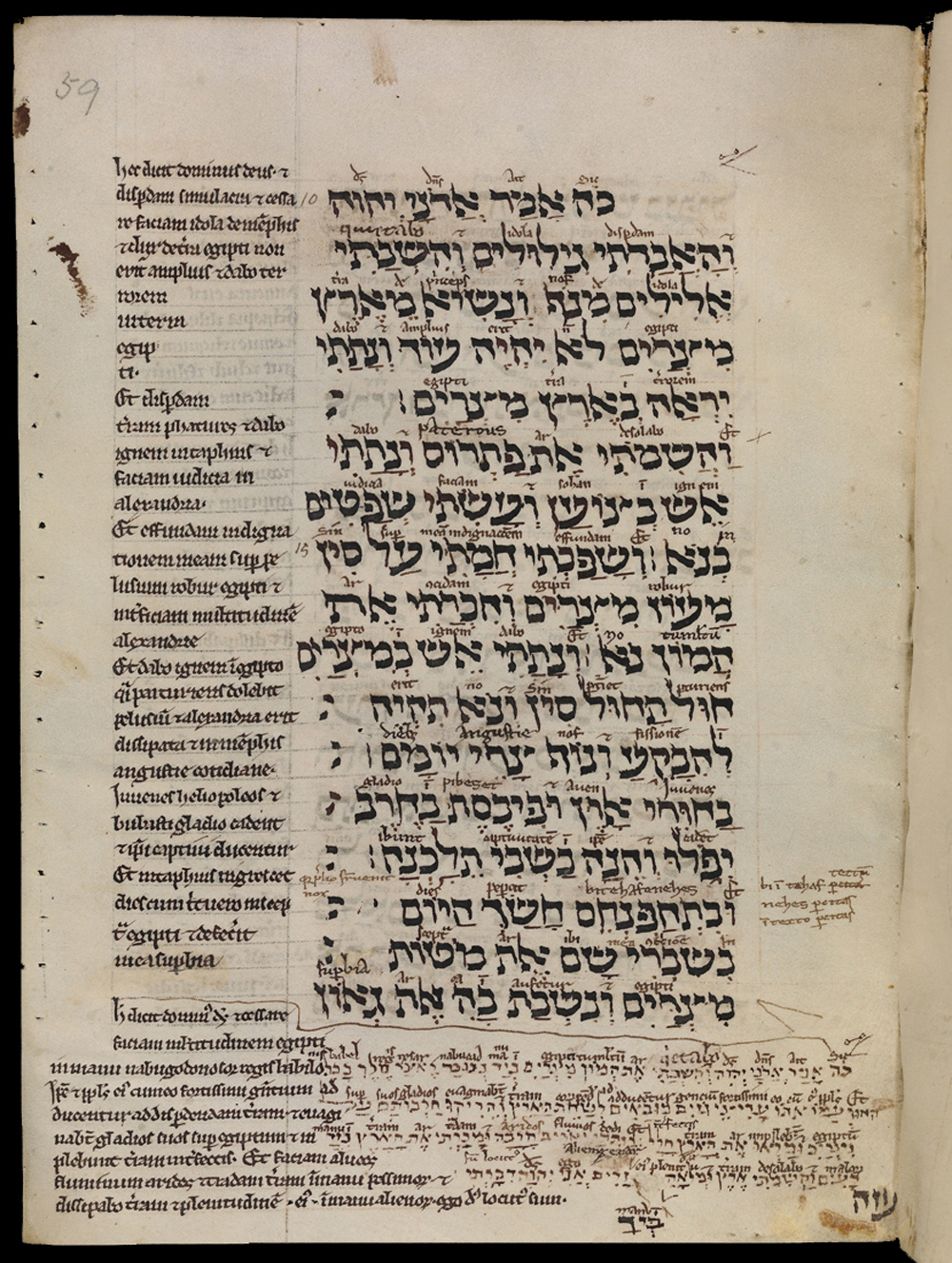
- Book of Ezekiel 30:13–18 in an English manuscript from the early 13th century, MS. Bodl. Or. 62, fol. 59a. A Latin translation appears in the margins with further interlineations above the Hebrew.
- Book: Book of Ezekiel
- Hebrew Bible part: Nevi'im
- Order in the Hebrew part: 7
- Category: Latter Prophets
- Christian Bible part: Old Testament
- Order in the Christian part: 26

Ezekiel 32 is the thirty-second chapter of the Book of Ezekiel in the Hebrew Bible or the Old Testament of the Christian Bible. This book contains the prophecies attributed to the prophet/priest Ezekiel, and is one of the Books of the Prophets. This chapter contains two revelations from God regarding Egypt and its Pharaoh, concluding Ezekiel's prophecies against Egypt (chapters 29-32).

== Text ==
The original text was written in the Hebrew language. This chapter is divided into 32 verses.

=== Textual witnesses ===
Some early manuscripts containing the text of this chapter in Hebrew are of the Masoretic Text tradition, which includes the Codex Cairensis (895), the Petersburg Codex of the Prophets (916), Aleppo Codex (10th century), and Codex Leningradensis (1008).

There is also a translation into Koine Greek known as the Septuagint, made in the last few centuries BC. Extant ancient manuscripts of the Septuagint version include Codex Vaticanus (B; $\mathfrak{G}$^{B}; 4th century), Codex Alexandrinus (A; $\mathfrak{G}$^{A}; 5th century) and Codex Marchalianus (Q; $\mathfrak{G}$^{Q}; 6th century). (Note: Ezekiel is missing from the extant Codex Sinaiticus.)

== Verse 1 ==
And it came to pass in the twelfth year, in the twelfth month, on the first day of the month, that the word of the Lord came to me, saying,

The date corresponds to 3 March, 586 or 585 BCE, based on an analysis by German theologian Bernhard Lang. The New Living Translation makes explicit reference to 3 March as the date.

== Verse 2 ==
"Son of man, take up a lamentation for Pharaoh king of Egypt, and say to him:

‘You are like a young lion among the nations,
And you are like a monster in the seas,
Bursting forth in your rivers,
Troubling the waters with your feet,
And fouling their rivers."

- "Son of man" (Hebrew: בן־אדם ḇen-’ā-ḏām): this phrase is used 93 times to address Ezekiel.
- "Pharaoh" (Hebrew: פרעה par-‘ōh; Egyptian: pr-±o, "great house"; Greek: Φαραω, Pharao): the title of ancient Egyptian kings, of royal court, and (in new kingdom) of the king, until the Persian invasion.

== Verse 17 ==
It came to pass also in the twelfth year, on the fifteenth day of the month, that the word of the Lord came to me, saying:

The date, depending on the month, corresponds to a day between April 27, 586 BCE to March 17, 585 BCE, based on the analysis by Bernhard Lang. The New Living Translation assumes the month is the same as in verse 1, so this revelation would have been heard on 17 March 585 BCE.

== Verse 27 ==
They do not lie with the mighty

Who are fallen of the uncircumcised,
Who have gone down to hell with their weapons of war;

They have laid their swords under their heads,

But their iniquities will be on their bones,
Because of the terror of the mighty in the land of the living. (NKJV)

Egypt will join other nations which were judged by God in "the depths of the earth" ("Pit" or "Sheol"). Considering this "a difficult verse", Andrew Davidson notes that "some scholars would ... alter 'fallen' (nophelim) into 'Nephilim' (cf. R. V. Genesis 6:4)"; he considers this "an unnecessary change".

== See also ==
- Assyria
- Edom
- Elam
- Egypt
- Meshech
- Pharaoh
- Sidon
- Tubal
- Related Bible parts: Isaiah 14, Ezekiel 29, Ezekiel 30, Ezekiel 31

== Bibliography ==
- Bromiley, Geoffrey W. (1995). International Standard Bible Encyclopedia: vol. iv, Q-Z. Eerdmans. ISBN 9780802837844.
- Brown, Francis; Briggs, Charles A.; Driver, S. R. (1994). The Brown-Driver-Briggs Hebrew and English Lexicon (reprint ed.). Hendrickson Publishers. ISBN 978-1565632066.
- Clements, Ronald E (1996). Ezekiel. Westminster John Knox Press. ISBN 9780664252724.
- Gesenius, H. W. F. (1979). Gesenius' Hebrew and Chaldee Lexicon to the Old Testament Scriptures: Numerically Coded to Strong's Exhaustive Concordance, with an English Index. Translated by Tregelles, Samuel Prideaux (7th ed.). Baker Book House.
- Joyce, Paul M. (2009). Ezekiel: A Commentary. Continuum. ISBN 9780567483614.
- Kee, Howard Clark; Meyers, Eric M.; Rogerson, John; Levine, Amy-Jill; Saldarini, Anthony J. (2008). Chilton, Bruce (ed.). The Cambridge Companion to the Bible (2, revised ed.). Cambridge University Press. ISBN 9780521691406.
- Würthwein, Ernst (1995). The Text of the Old Testament. Translated by Rhodes, Erroll F. Grand Rapids, MI: Wm. B. Eerdmans. ISBN 0-8028-0788-7.
