= Siege of Tyre =

Siege of Tyre may refer to:

- Siege of Tyre (724–720 BC), a siege by the Assyrians under Shalmaneser V and Sargon II
- Siege of Tyre (701 BC), a siege by the Assyrians under Sennacherib
- Siege of Tyre (671 BC), a siege by the Assyrians under Esarhaddon
- Siege of Tyre (663 BC), a siege by the Assyrians under Ashurbanipal
- Siege of Tyre (586–573 BC), a siege by the Babylonians under Nebuchadnezzar II
- Siege of Tyre (332 BC), a siege by the Macedonians under Alexander the Great
- Siege of Tyre (315–314 BC), a siege by Antigonus I Monophthalmus
- Siege of Tyre (996–998), a siege by the Fatimids
- Siege of Tyre (1111–1112), a siege by the Crusaders under Baldwin I of Jerusalem
- Siege of Tyre (1124), a siege by the Venetians
- Siege of Tyre (1187), a siege by the Ayyubids under Saladin
