= Ezekiel's cherub in Eden =

Figure mentioned in Ezekiel 28:13-14

The cherub in Eden is a figure mentioned in Ezekiel 28:13–14. Many translations, including the New International Version, identify the cherub with the King of Tyre, specifically Ithobaal III (reigned 591–573 BC) who according to the list of kings of Tyre of Josephus was reigning contemporary with Ezekiel at the time of the first fall of Jerusalem. Other translations, including the New Revised Standard Version, see the cherub as the king's guardian.

== Background ==
Ezekiel has cited Eden in two extensive passages and one of these (28:11-19) portrayed the king of Tyre in terms of the cherub in Eden. The city is famed for the temple complex of Melkart with its renowned garden enclosure.

== Tertullian ==
Tertullian in Against Marcion 2:10 linked the reference to the fall of Satan, which has been followed by many Christians since. Its theological interpretation has been subject to much theorizing. One recognized that the prophet depicted such cherub within a state of primordial perfection, which was terminated by sin and consequent exile from the "mountain of God". Another theory posited that Eden was a simile for the portrayal of the splendor of a given geographical area, which in this case is Tyre and that its human king represented Satan, who was a snake in the garden in Genesis 3.

== See also ==
- ʿAṯtar
- Ezekiel 28
