= Chileab =

Human biblical figure (Second Book of Samuel)

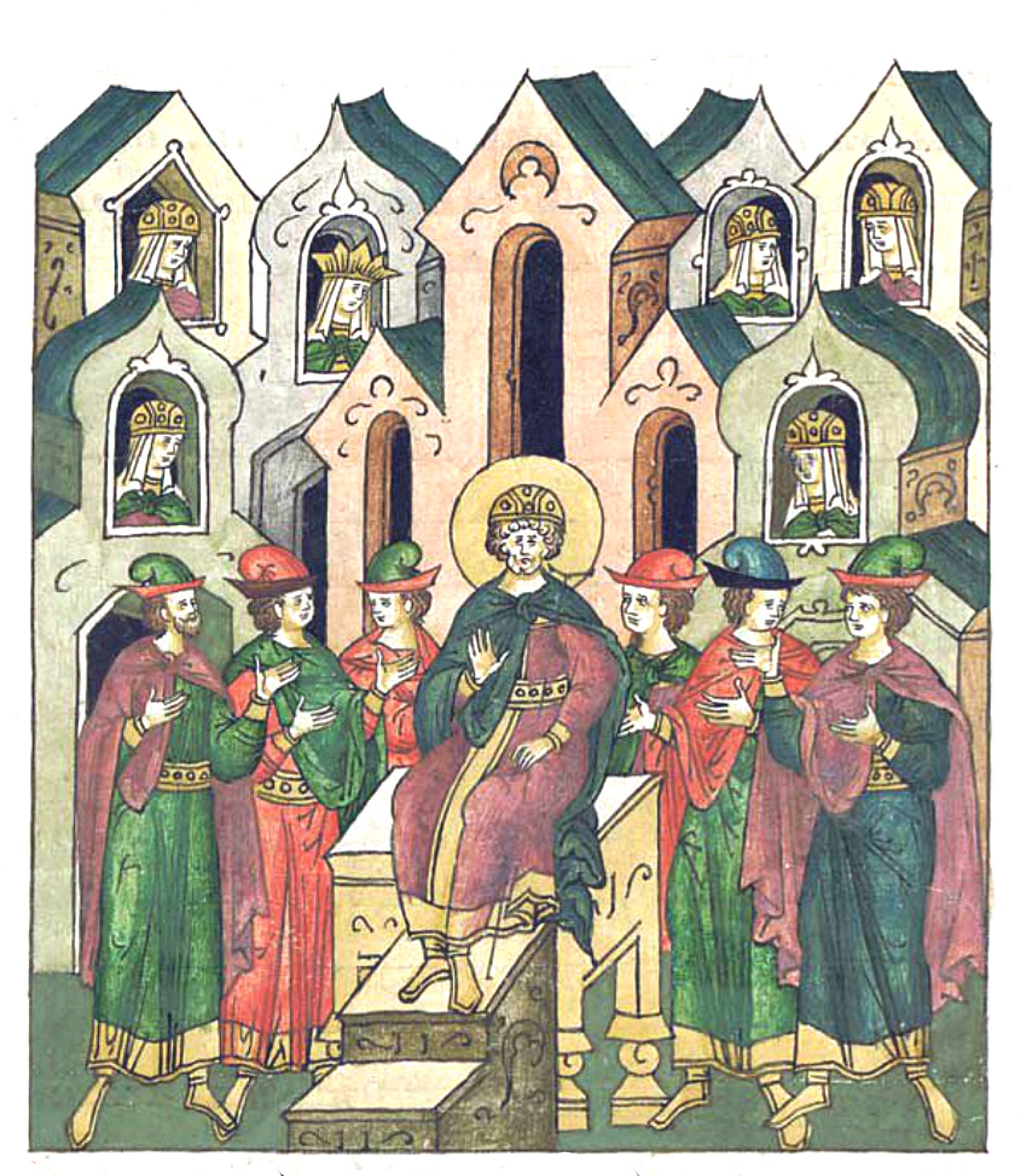
David with his sons including Chileab

Chileab (Hebrew: כִלְאָב, Ḵīləʾāḇ) also known as Daniel, was the second son of David, King of Israel, according to the Bible. He was David's son with his second wife Abigail, widow of Nabal the Carmelite, and is mentioned in 1 Chronicles 3:1, and 2 Samuel 3:3. Unlike the other of David's three elder sons, Amnon, Absalom, and Adonijah who were important characters in 2 Samuel, Chileab is only named in the list of David's sons and no further mention is made of him. Though being the second son, Chileab was not a contender for the throne of Israel, even after the death of the first-born Amnon, the third-born Absalom and fourth-born Adonijah. He may have died before his father. Later rabbinic traditions name him as one of four ancient Israelites who died without sin, the other three being Benjamin, Jesse and Amram. The throne eventually passed to his younger half brother, Solomon.

Chileab is known as Daluyah (Ancient Greek: Δαλουιὰ, Dalouià) in 2 Samuel in the Septuagint. It has been suggested that Chileab is the Daniel character mentioned in Ezekiel 28.

According to Rashi, Rabbi Isaac said that some questioned whether Abigail was pregnant through David or her first husband, Nabal; therefore, God arranged that Chileab would resemble David. It is possible his name "Chileab," which can be translated "perfection of the father," is a reference to (or cause of) that legend.
