= Daniel 4 =

Fourth chapter of the Book of Daniel

- ← chapter 3 chapter 5 →
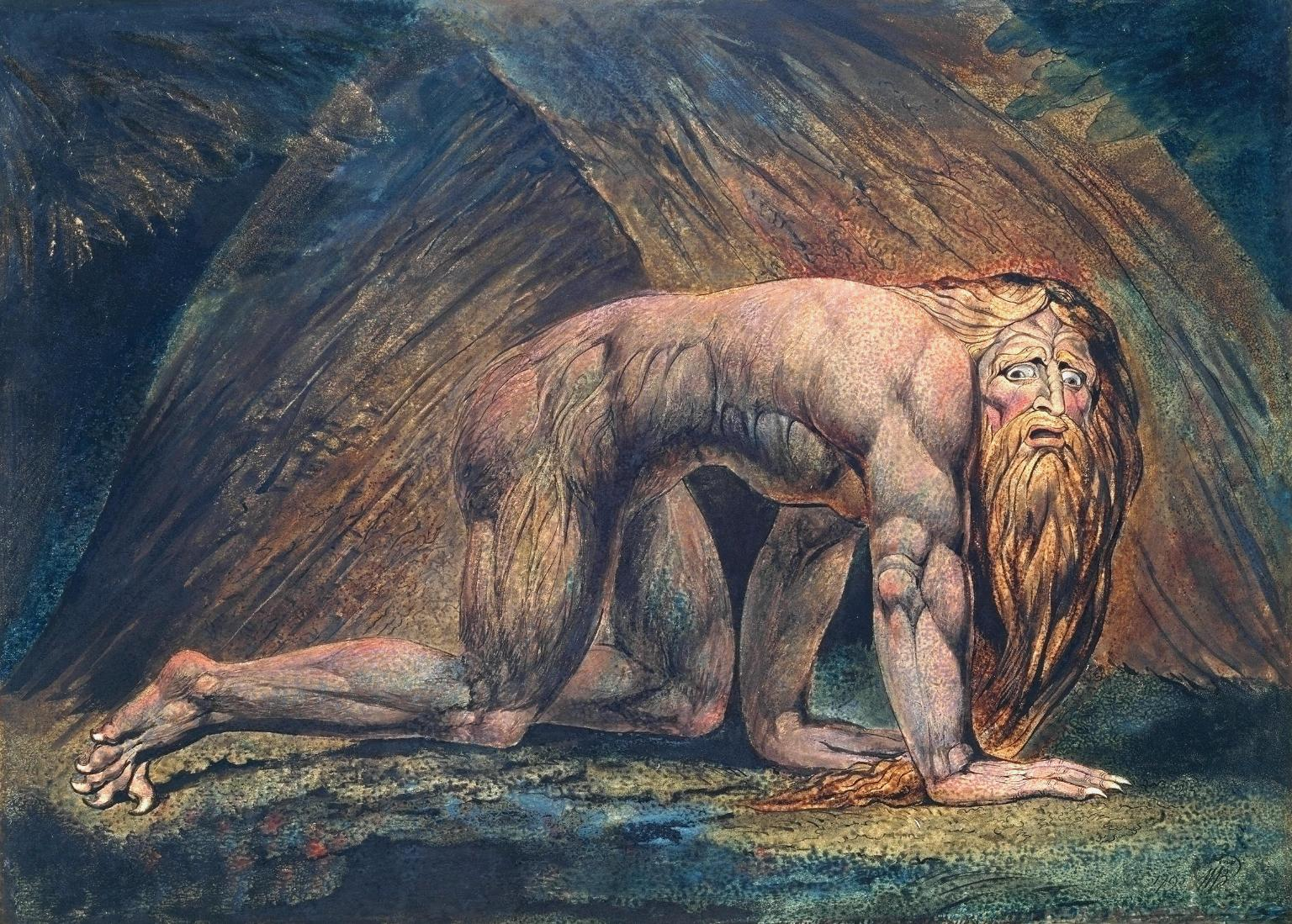
- Nebuchadnezzar, by William Blake.
- Book: Book of Daniel
- Category: Ketuvim
- Christian Bible part: Old Testament
- Order in the Christian part: 27

Daniel 4, the fourth chapter of the Bible's Book of Daniel, is presented in the form of a letter from king Nebuchadnezzar II in which he learns a lesson of God's sovereignty, "who is able to bring low those who walk in pride". Nebuchadnezzar dreams of a great tree that shelters the whole world, but an angelic "watcher" appears and decrees that the tree must be cut down and that for seven years, he will have his human mind taken away and will eat grass like an ox. This comes to pass, and at the end of his punishment, Nebuchadnezzar praises God. Daniel's role is to interpret the dream for the king.

The message of the story is that all earthly power, including that of kings, is subordinate to the power of God. This chapter forms a contrasting pair with chapter 5, where Nebuchadnezzar learns that God alone controls the world and he is restored to his kingdom, while Belshazzar fails to learn from Nebuchadnezzar's example and has his kingdom taken from him and given to the Medes and Persians.

== Summary ==
(Summary of Daniel 4 partly based on the translation of C. L. Seow in his commentary on Daniel.)

Nebuchadnezzar II, King of Babylon, addresses a letter "to all peoples, nations and languages that live throughout the earth" telling them he will recount the "signs and wonders" that the Most High God has worked for me."

Nebuchadnezzar was living in his palace in peace and prosperity when he had a strange dream which troubled him. None of his diviners and magicians were able to explain it for him, and he called for Daniel, chief of all his wise men. This is the dream: The king saw a great tree at the centre of the earth, its top touching heaven, visible to the ends of the earth, and providing food and shelter to all the creatures of the world. As the king watched he saw a "holy watcher" come from heaven and call for the tree to be cut down and his human mind changed to that of a beast for seven "times". This sentence "is rendered by decree of the watchers ... in order that all who live may know that the Most High is sovereign over the kingdom of mortals..."

Daniel is initially troubled, and he is reassured by the king. Daniel then expresses the hope that the dream applied to someone else - any of his enemies - but he goes on to explain: the king himself is the tree, and by the decree of God he will lose his human mind for the mind of an animal, and live with wild animals and eat grass like an ox. This came to pass, until at the end of the seven years Nebuchadnezzar regained his human mind and his kingdom were restored. The letter concludes with Nebuchadnezzar's praise of God, for "all his works are truth, and his ways are justice, and he is able to bring low those who walk in pride".

== Composition and structure ==
It is generally accepted that the Book of Daniel originated as a collection of folktales among the Jewish community in Babylon and Mesopotamia in the Persian and early Hellenistic periods (5th to 3rd centuries BCE), expanded in the Maccabean era (mid-2nd century BCE) by the visions in chapters 7–12. The tales are in the voice of an anonymous narrator, except for chapter 4 which is in the form of a letter from king Nebuchadnezzar.

Modern scholarship agrees that Daniel is a legendary figure; it is possible that this name was chosen for the hero of the book because of his reputation as a wise seer in Hebrew tradition.

=== Structure ===
The chapter opens with an introduction typical of Aramaic letters of the post-exilic period ("King Nebuchadnezzar to all peoples, nations and languages...May you have abundant peace!"). Jewish bibles, and some Christian ones, attach this to the end of chapter 3, so that Nebuchadnezzar's letter concerns the events of chapter 3 (the Fiery Furnace) instead of his madness. Seow suggests that this is no more than an accidental result of the fact that chapter divisions were only introduced in the 13th century, and given that chapter 4 is in Nebuchadnezzar's voice, the attachment to this chapter seems the most fitting choice. This is followed by the dream, Daniel's interpretation, the sentence, the king's recovery, and a final doxology in which the king repeats his praise of God.

=== Daniel 4 and the Prayer of Nabonidus ===
The Prayer of Nabonidus is a fragmentary story from the Dead Sea Scrolls (scroll 4QPrNab) with close parallels to Daniel 4. Told in the first person by King Nabonidus of Babylon (reigned 556–539 BCE), it tells how he was smitten by an inflammation for seven years while in the oasis-city of Tayma, in north-western Arabia, and how a Jewish seer explains to him that this is because he is an idol-worshiper. Another passage, extremely fragmented, apparently introduces a dream narrative. The parallels with the history of Nabonidus are extremely close, and while Daniel 4 is not based on the Prayer, it is likely that it is a variant of an original Jewish story in which Nabonidus, and not Nebuchadnezzar, was the king.

== Genre and themes ==
Daniel 4 is a legend set in the royal court, like the other tales of chapters 1–6. The theme is the relationship between heavenly and earthly power: the king's power on earth is not denied, but it is subordinate to the power of God. Chapters 4 and 5 contrast Nebuchadnezzar, who learns his lesson when humbled by God, and Belshazzar, who learns nothing from Nebuchadnezzar's example and blasphemes against God, who then gives his kingdom to the Medes and Persians.

== Interpretation ==
=== The "holy watcher" and the heavenly council ===
In Nebuchadnezzar's dream a "holy watcher" descends from heaven to pronounce sentence on tree and king. This is the sole instance of this phrase in the Hebrew Bible, although it echoes the frequent descriptions of God's watchfulness and the word appears several times in the Book of Enoch, where it is usually applied to the fallen angels, but on occasion refers to the holy angels. The watcher's commands to cut down the tree (i.e., Nebuchadnezzar) and strip it are issued, presumably, to the divine beings who carry out God's will.

=== Symbolic imagery: the tree and the beast ===
Daniel 4's tree parallels the similar image in Ezekiel 31, where the pharaoh of Egypt is compared to a mighty tree towering above all others with its top in the clouds, a symbol of human arrogance about to be cut down. The metaphor then switches to depict Nebuchadnezzar as a beast dependent on grace for its survival until he learns humility before God. Possibly significantly, the king is restored when he "lifts up" his eyes to heaven.

=== Verse 19 ===
Then Daniel, whose name was Belteshazzar, was astonished for a time, and his thoughts troubled him. So the king spoke, and said, "Belteshazzar, do not let the dream or its interpretation trouble you." Belteshazzar answered and said, "My lord, may the dream concern those who hate you, and its interpretation concern your enemies!"

The "time" during which Daniel was troubled is expressed as "an hour" in the King James Version, but English commentator Samuel Driver records the doubts of many as to "whether shâ‘âh is meant here to denote exactly what we call an 'hour'" and commends "a moment" as a better translation. In place of the hope that the dream "might be" about Nebuchadnezzar's enemies, the contemporary Evangelical Heritage Version (2013-2019) records Daniel's regret in knowing this is not the case: "My Lord, if only the dream were about your enemies and its meaning about your foes!"

=== Verse 34 ===
When that period was over, I, Nebuchadnezzar, lifted my eyes to heaven, and my reason returned to me. I blessed the Most High, and praised and honored the one who lives forever. For his sovereignty is an everlasting sovereignty, and his kingdom endures from generation to generation.

Biblical scholar Philip R. Davies notes that the restoration of Nebuchadnezzar comes "when the king 'lifts his eyes' and his reason returns; also 'when the period was over' exactly! The coincidence of human free action and divine decree, the core difficulty of any theory of predestination, is glossed over." Davies poses the question: "does Nebuchadnezzar confess his arrogance because his reason is restored, or vice versa?"

=== Verse 37 ===
Now I, Nebuchadnezzar, praise and extol and honor the King of heaven, all of whose works are truth, and His ways justice. And those who walk in pride He is able to put down.

This is the only occasion in the whole of the Hebrew Bible where God is referred to as the King of heaven.

== See also ==
- Enkidu's Wilderness and Eating Grass
