= Ezekiel 17 =

Book of Ezekiel, chapter 17

- ← chapter 16 chapter 18 →
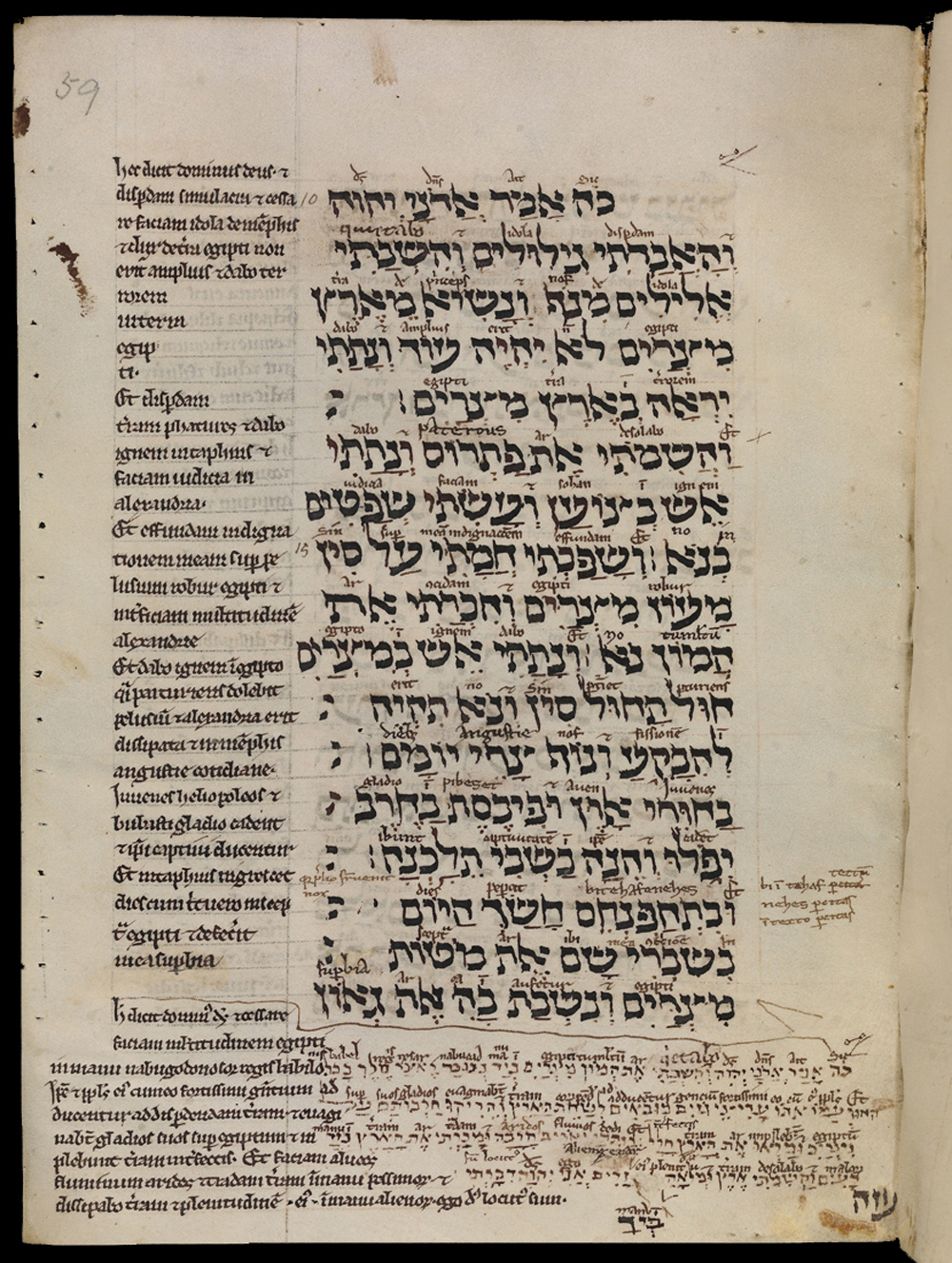
- Book of Ezekiel 30:13–18 in an English manuscript from the early 13th century, MS. Bodl. Or. 62, fol. 59a. A Latin translation appears in the margins with further interlineations above the Hebrew.
- Book: Book of Ezekiel
- Hebrew Bible part: Nevi'im
- Order in the Hebrew part: 7
- Category: Latter Prophets
- Christian Bible part: Old Testament
- Order in the Christian part: 26

Ezekiel 17 is the seventeenth chapter of the Book of Ezekiel in the Hebrew Bible or the Old Testament of the Christian Bible. This book contains the prophecies attributed to the prophet/priest Ezekiel, and is one of the Books of the Prophets. This chapter tells (verses 1–10), and then interprets (verses 11–21), the riddle of the great eagle. The original text of this chapter is written in the Hebrew language. This chapter is divided into 24 verses.

== The Riddle to the House of Israel (17:1–10) ==
The ḥidah or the riddle to the house of Israel, is the oracle revealed to Ezekiel the prophet. It is a mashal, which is a proverb and a parable. It is also considered an enigma. The riddle is 8 verses long from verse 3 to verse 10.

=== Hebrew Text ===
The following table shows the Hebrew text of Ezekiel 17:1-10 with vowels alongside an English translation based upon the JPS 1917 translation (now in the public domain).

Verse	Hebrew text	English translation (JPS 1917)
1	וַיְהִ֥י דְבַר־יְהֹוָ֖ה אֵלַ֥י לֵאמֹֽר׃	And the word of the LORD came unto me, saying:
2	בֶּן־אָדָ֕ם ח֥וּד חִידָ֖ה וּמְשֹׁ֣ל מָשָׁ֑ל אֶל־בֵּ֖ית יִשְׂרָאֵֽל׃	’Son of man, put forth a riddle, and speak a parable unto the house of Israel,
3	ּוְאָמַרְתָּ֞ כֹּה־אָמַ֣ר ׀ אֲדֹנָ֣י יֱהֹוִ֗ה הַנֶּ֤שֶׁר הַגָּדוֹל֙ גְּד֤וֹל הַכְּנָפַ֙יִם֙ אֶ֣רֶךְ הָאֵ֔בֶר מָלֵא֙ הַנּוֹצָ֔ה אֲשֶׁר־ל֖וֹ הָרִקְמָ֑ה בָּ֚א אֶל־הַלְּבָנ֔וֹן וַיִּקַּ֖ח אֶת־צַמֶּ֥רֶת הָאָֽרֶז׃	and say: Thus saith the Lord GOD: A great eagle with great wings And long pinions, Full of feathers, which had divers colours, Came unto Lebanon, And took the top of the cedar;
4	אֵ֛ת רֹ֥אשׁ יְנִיקוֹתָ֖יו קָטָ֑ף וַיְבִיאֵ֙הוּ֙ אֶל־אֶ֣רֶץ כְּנַ֔עַן בְּעִ֥יר רֹכְלִ֖ים שָׂמֽוֹ׃	He cropped off the topmost of the young twigs thereof, And carried it into a land of traffic; He set it in a city of merchants.
5	וַיִּקַּח֙ מִזֶּ֣רַע הָאָ֔רֶץ וַֽיִּתְּנֵ֖הוּ בִּשְׂדֵה־זָ֑רַע קָ֚ח עַל־מַ֣יִם רַבִּ֔ים צַפְצָפָ֖ה שָׂמֽוֹ׃	He took also of the seed of the land, And planted it in a fruitful soil; He placed it beside many waters, He set it as a slip.
6	וַיִּצְמַ֡ח וַיְהִי֩ לְגֶ֨פֶן סֹרַ֜חַת שִׁפְלַ֣ת קוֹמָ֗ה לִפְנ֤וֹת דָּֽלִיּוֹתָיו֙ אֵלָ֔יו וְשׇׁרָשָׁ֖יו תַּחְתָּ֣יו יִהְי֑וּ וַתְּהִ֣י לְגֶ֔פֶן וַתַּ֣עַשׂ בַּדִּ֔ים וַתְּשַׁלַּ֖ח פֹּרֹֽאות׃	And it grew, and became a spreading vine Of low stature, Whose tendrils might turn toward him, And the roots thereof be under him; So it became a vine, and brought forth branches, And shot forth sprigs.
7	וַיְהִ֤י נֶֽשֶׁר־אֶחָד֙ גָּד֔וֹל גְּד֥וֹל כְּנָפַ֖יִם וְרַב־נוֹצָ֑ה וְהִנֵּה֩ הַגֶּ֨פֶן הַזֹּ֜את כָּפְנָ֧ה שׇׁרָשֶׁ֣יהָ עָלָ֗יו וְדָֽלִיּוֹתָיו֙ שִׁלְחָה־לּ֔וֹ לְהַשְׁק֣וֹת אוֹתָ֔הּ מֵעֲרֻג֖וֹת מַטָּעָֽהּ׃	There was also another great eagle with great wings And many feathers; And, behold, this vine did bend Its roots toward him, And shot forth its branches toward him, from the beds of its plantation, That he might water it.
8	אֶל־שָׂ֥דֶה טּ֛וֹב אֶל־מַ֥יִם רַבִּ֖ים הִ֣יא שְׁתוּלָ֑ה לַעֲשׂ֤וֹת עָנָף֙ וְלָשֵׂ֣את פֶּ֔רִי לִהְי֖וֹת לְגֶ֥פֶן אַדָּֽרֶת׃	It was planted in a good soil By many waters, That it might bring forth branches, and that it might bear fruit, That it might be a stately vine.
9	אֱמֹ֗ר כֹּ֥ה אָמַ֛ר אֲדֹנָ֥י יֱהֹוִ֖ה תִּצְלָ֑ח הֲלוֹא֩ אֶת־שׇׁרָשֶׁ֨יהָ יְנַתֵּ֜ק וְאֶת־פִּרְיָ֣הּ ׀ יְקוֹסֵ֣ס וְיָבֵ֗שׁ כׇּל־טַרְפֵּ֤י צִמְחָהּ֙ תִּיבָ֔שׁ וְלֹֽא־בִזְרֹ֤עַ גְּדוֹלָה֙ וּבְעַם־רָ֔ב לְמַשְׂא֥וֹת אוֹתָ֖הּ מִשׇּׁרָשֶֽׁיהָ׃	Say thou: Thus saith the Lord GOD: Shall it prosper? Shall he not pull up the roots thereof, And cut off the fruit thereof, that it wither, Yea, wither in all its sprouting leaves? Neither shall great power or much people be at hand When it is plucked up by the roots thereof.
10	וְהִנֵּ֥ה שְׁתוּלָ֖ה הֲתִצְלָ֑ח הֲלֹא֩ כְגַ֨עַת בָּ֜הּ ר֤וּחַ הַקָּדִים֙ תִּיבַ֣שׁ יָבֹ֔שׁ עַל־עֲרֻגֹ֥ת צִמְחָ֖הּ תִּיבָֽשׁ׃ {פ}	Yea, behold, being planted, shall it prosper? Shall it not utterly wither, when the east wind toucheth it? In the beds where it grew it shall wither.’

=== Textual witnesses ===
Some early manuscripts containing the text of this chapter in Hebrew are of the Masoretic Text tradition, which includes the Codex Cairensis (895), the Petersburg Codex of the Prophets (916), Aleppo Codex (10th century), Codex Leningradensis (1008).

There is also a translation into Koine Greek known as the Septuagint, made in the last few centuries BC. Extant ancient manuscripts of the Septuagint version include Codex Vaticanus (B; $\mathfrak{G}$^{B}; 4th century), Codex Alexandrinus (A; $\mathfrak{G}$^{A}; 5th century) and Codex Marchalianus (Q; $\mathfrak{G}$^{Q}; 6th century). (Note: Ezekiel is missing from the extant Codex Sinaiticus.)

== Parable of two eagles and a vine (17:1–21) ==
=== Verse 2 ===
Son of man, put forth a riddle,

and speak a parable unto the house of Israel.

- "Son of man" (Hebrew: בן־אדם ben-adam): this phrase is used 93 times to address Ezekiel.
- "Riddle" (Hebrew: חידה hidah): the Hebrew word has a meaning of "dark, obscure utterance", requiring interpretation; the passage is also called a "parable", as containing a similitude (Hebrew: משל mashal) or comparison.

=== Verse 3 ===
and say, ‘Thus says the Lord God:

"A great eagle with large wings and long pinions,
Full of feathers of various colors,
Came to Lebanon
And took from the cedar the highest branch."

- "A great eagle": refers to Nebuchadnezzar, king of Babylon. Conquerors are also compared to an eagle in:
- Deuteronomy 28:49;
- Isaiah 46:11;
- Jeremiah 4:13;
- Jeremiah 48:40;
- Hosea 8:1;
- Lamentations 4:19.

=== Verse 9 ===
"Say, 'Thus says the Lord God:

"Will it thrive?
Will he not pull up its roots,
Cut off its fruit,
And leave it to wither?
All of its spring leaves will wither,
And no great power or many people
Will be needed to pluck it up by its roots."'"

- Rashi noted that the entire Hebrew alphabet is found in this verse.

=== Verse 15 ===
But he rebelled against him in sending his ambassadors into Egypt, that they might give him horses and much people. Shall he prosper? Shall he escape who does such things? Can he indeed break the covenant and be delivered?

- "Against him": here, "against the King of Babylon"
- "Into Egypt": that is, asking help from the king of Egypt at that time, Pharaoh Hophra (Apries) (Jeremiah 37:5; Jeremiah 44:30).
- "Break the covenant": Zedekiah broke the covenant not only of the king of Babylon but also of YHWH (Ezekiel 17:19); Ezekiel follows the prophecy of Jeremiah, perhaps he heard Jeremiah spoke in the beginning of Zedekiah's reign (Jeremiah 27:9-17: "serve the king of Babylon and live") or even probably he had heard Jeremiah's words spoken in the fourth year of Jehoiakim (Ezekiel 25) or Jeremiah's advice to the exiles (cf. Jeremiah 29:4).

=== Verse 16 ===
As I live, saith the Lord God, surely in the place where the king dwelleth that made him king, whose oath he despised, and whose covenant he brake, even with him in the midst of Babylon he shall die.

- The prophecy was fulfilled when Zedekiah died in the prison in Babylon (2 Kings 25:6,7; Jeremiah 39:7; Jeremiah 52:11).

== Israel exalted at last (17:22–24) ==
=== Verse 23 ===
On the mountain height of Israel I will plant it;

and it will bring forth boughs, and bear fruit, and be a majestic cedar.

Under it will dwell birds of every sort;

in the shadow of its branches they will dwell.

This "messianic allegory" is presented with the reference to the "branch" in Isaiah 11:1; Jeremiah 23:5–6; Zechariah 3:8, which grows to be "a majestic cedar."

As shown in the Daily Mass Readings provided in the Latin Rite of the Catholic Church, one of the main references in the Gospels is the Parable of the Mustard Seed (Mark 4:30–32).

== See also ==
- Babylon
- Cedrus
- Eagle
- Egypt
- Jerusalem
- Lebanon
- Pharaoh
- Zedekiah
- Related Bible parts: 2 Kings 24, 2 Chronicles 36, Isaiah 11, Jeremiah 37, Jeremiah 52, Ezekiel 29, Ezekiel 30, Matthew 13

== Bibliography ==
- Bromiley, Geoffrey W. (1995). International Standard Bible Encyclopedia: vol. iv, Q-Z. Eerdmans. ISBN 9780802837844.
- Brown, Francis; Driver, S. R.; Briggs, Charles A. (1906). The Brown-Driver-Briggs Hebrew and English Lexicon (1939 reprint ed.). Oxford University Press.
- Clements, Ronald E (1996). Ezekiel. Westminster John Knox Press. ISBN 9780664252724.
- Gesenius, H. W. F. (1979). Gesenius' Hebrew and Chaldee Lexicon to the Old Testament Scriptures: Numerically Coded to Strong's Exhaustive Concordance, with an English Index. Translated by Tregelles, Samuel Prideaux (7th ed.). Baker Book House.
- Huey, F. B. (1993). The New American Commentary - Jeremiah, Lamentations: An Exegetical and Theological Exposition of Holy Scripture, NIV Text. B&H Publishing Group. ISBN 9780805401165.
- Joyce, Paul M. (2009). Ezekiel: A Commentary. Continuum. ISBN 9780567483614.
- Würthwein, Ernst (1995). The Text of the Old Testament. Translated by Rhodes, Erroll F. Grand Rapids, MI: Wm. B. Eerdmans. ISBN 0-8028-0788-7.
