= Nebuchadnezzar (Blake) =

Print by William Blake first made in 1795

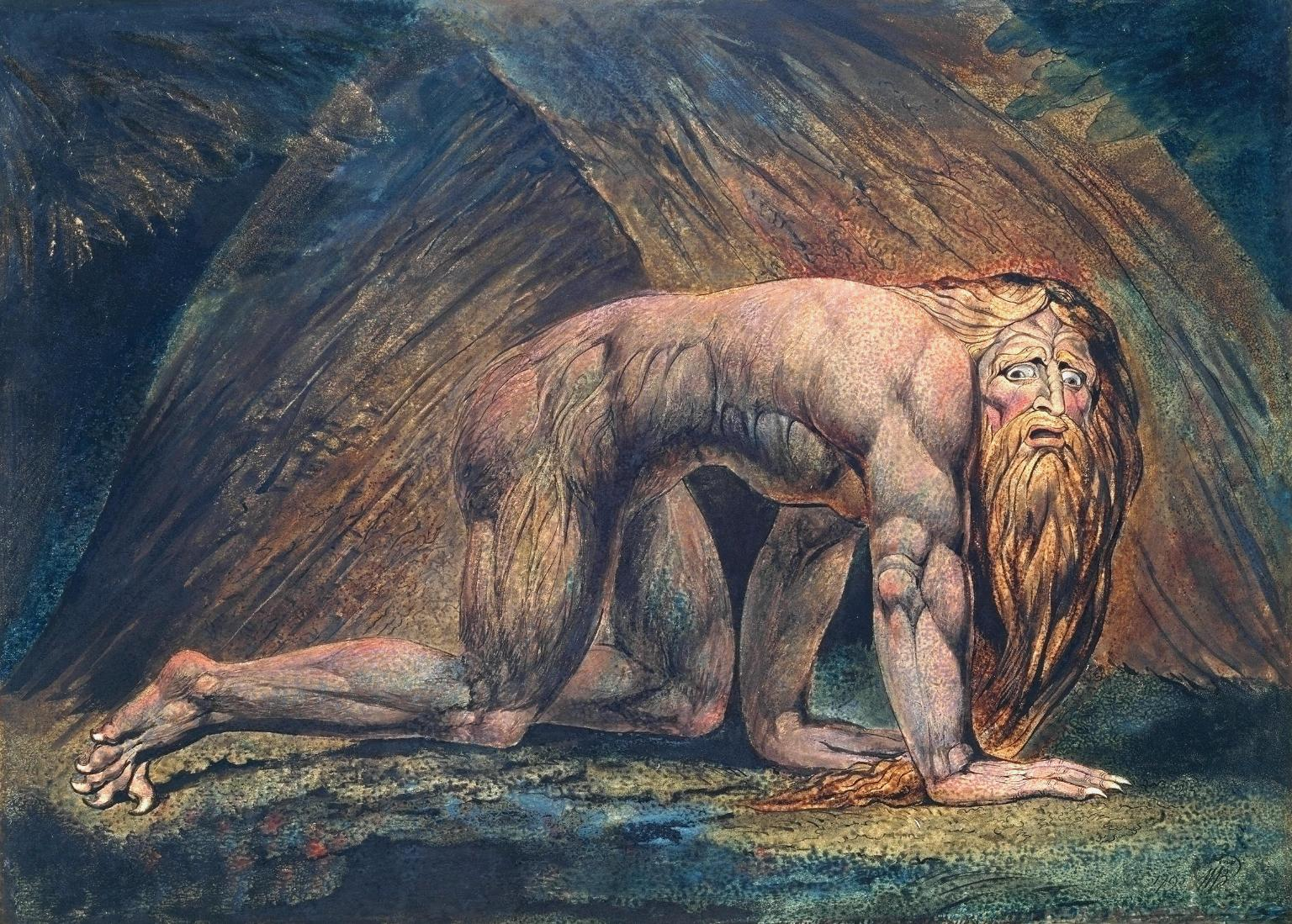
Nebuchadnezzar, Tate impression

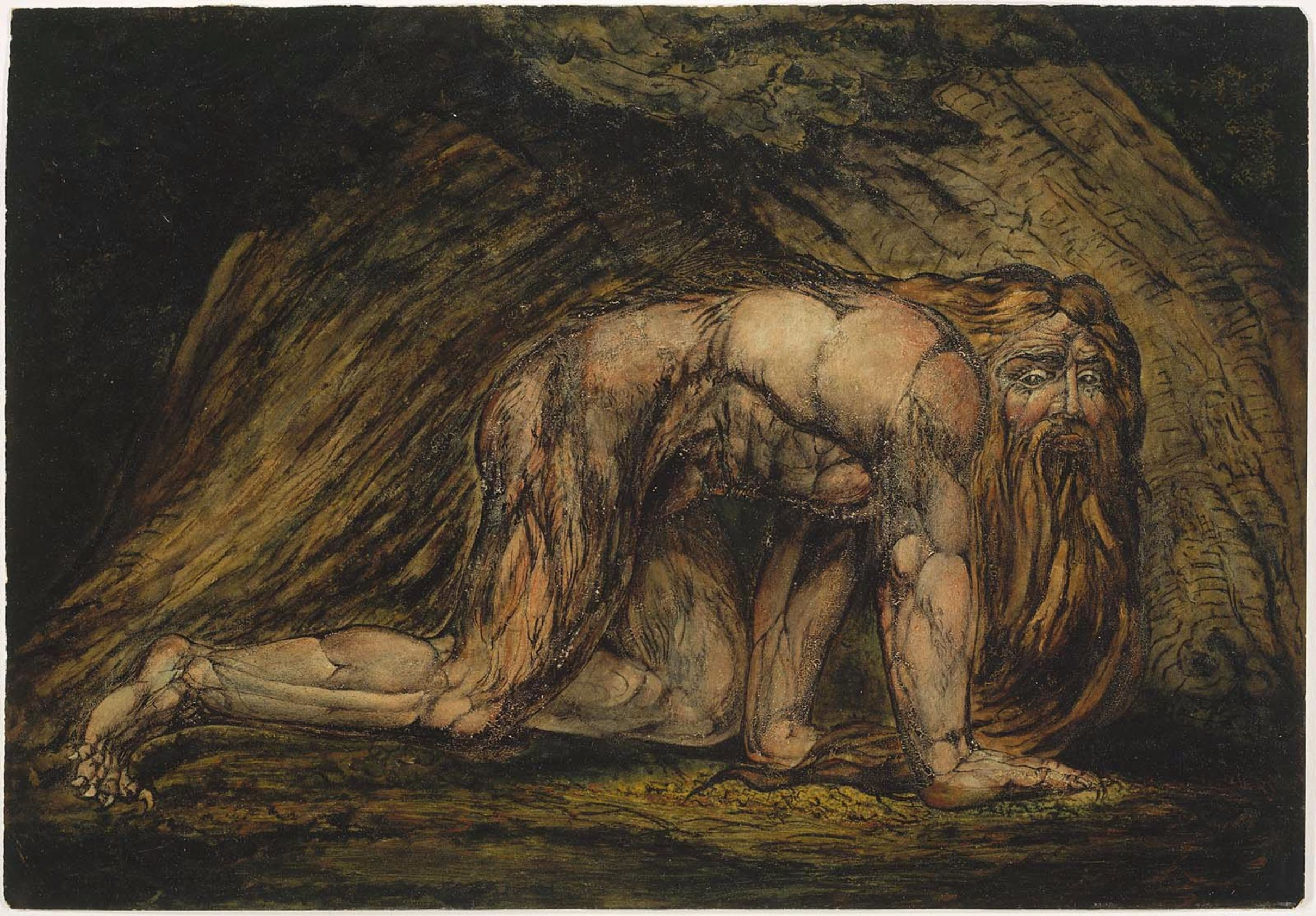
The Museum of Fine Arts, Boston impression. Probably printed in 1805

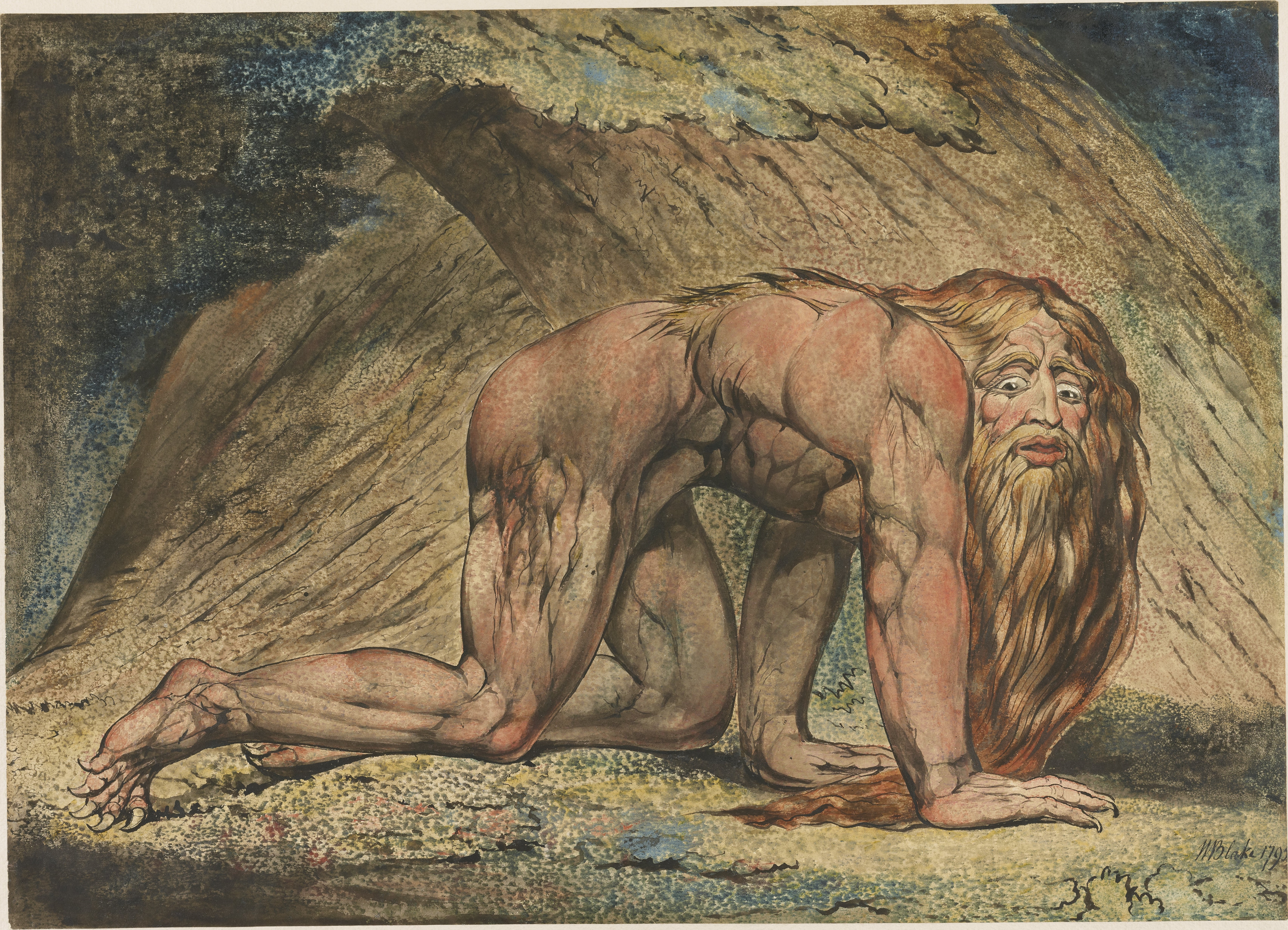
The Minneapolis Institute of Art impression. Printed 1795

Nebuchadnezzar is a colour monotype print with additions in ink and watercolour portraying the Old Testament Babylonian king Nebuchadnezzar II by the English poet, painter, and printmaker William Blake. Taken from the Book of Daniel, the legend of Nebuchadnezzar tells of a ruler who through hubris lost his mind and was reduced to animalistic madness and eating "grass as oxen".

According to the biographer Alexander Gilchrist (1828–1861), in Blake's print the viewer is faced with the "mad king crawling like a hunted beast into a den among the rocks; his tangled golden beard sweeping the ground, his nails like vultures' talons, and his wild eyes full of sullen terror. The powerful frame is losing semblance of humanity and is bestial in its rough growth of hair, reptile in the toad-like markings and spottings of the skin, which takes on unnatural hues of green, blue, and russet."

Nebuchadnezzar was part of the so-called Large Colour Prints; a series begun in 1795 of twelve 43 cm × 53 cm colour monotype prints, of most of which three copies were made. These were painted on millboard, after which the board was put through Blake's printing-press with a sheet of dampened paper to make the prints. After they were printed, Blake and his wife Catherine added ink and watercolour to the impressions. It existed in four impressions (copies), now in: Tate Britain in London, the Museum of Fine Arts, Boston, the Minneapolis Institute of Art, and a fourth which has been missing since 1887. Blake believed that Nebuchadnezzar was connected to the Christian apocalypse and to his personal view on the stages of human development.

== History ==
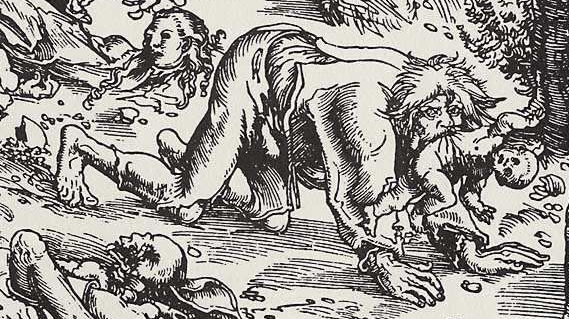
Detail of woodcut by Lucas Cranach the Elder, 1512

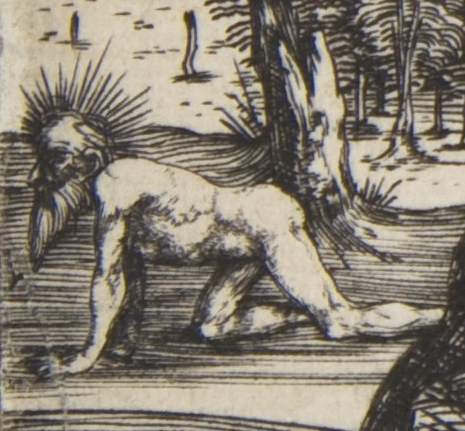
Detail of The Penance of St. John Chrysostom, engraving, 1496

Nebuchadnezzar was adapted from an earlier print in Blake's The Marriage of Heaven and Hell. The plates for the Large Colour Prints and the first prints were made in 1795, but further impressions seem to have been printed in about 1805. In the late summer of 1805, Blake sold to Thomas Butts Jr. eight impressions of the Large Colour Prints, including the Tate Nebuchadnezzar, for £1.1s each.

John Clark Strange bought Butts's prints on 29 June 1853 and later acquired the rest of the collection sold to Henry George Bohn. Although he originally wanted to produce a biography on Blake, he later abandoned this idea after he learned of Gilchrist's biography. However, his journal was filled with his notes for the biography and contained many accounts from those who knew Blake, excerpts from Blake's journal, and analysis of Blake's work. In his journal, he describes Nebuchadnezzar "crawling on his belly, naked covered with hair & nails grown long, eating grass.—'What was singular was that Blake's conception was almost a facsimile of an ancient German print of the same subject and which design Blake had never seen." Kenneth Clark identified the earlier image as a book illustration of a werewolf by Lucas Cranach the Elder, although a closer similarity is the small figure of the saint in Albrecht Dürer's 1496 engraving The Penance of St. John Chrysostom.

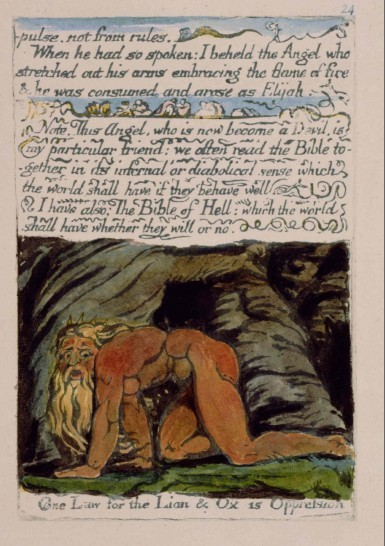
Blake's relief etching of Nebuchadnezzar from The Marriage of Heaven and Hell, c. 1790–93

== Other versions ==
Blake had earlier depicted Nebuchadnezzar on Plate 24 of The Marriage of Heaven and Hell naked on hands and knees carrying his crown. Nebuchadnezzar is represented as being in the wilderness and is, according to Samuel Palmer, similar to an older German woodcut where "almost the very same figure appears. Many years had elapsed after making his own design before Blake saw the woodcut." A further depiction was added to Edward Young's Night Thoughts Volume VII.

The image of Nebuchadnezzar is connected in Blake with the apocalypse in which the three people that the biblical Nebuchadnezzar burned to death were united with the Son of God, and this image is also connected to Blake's belief in four states of existence in which those burned are able to transcend into the final stage of human existence. Also, Nebuchadnezzar's dream of a statue represents human history from the beginning until the Apocalypse, and the image of Nebuchadnezzar's rule is connected to Blake's myth of Albion in The Four Zoas.

== Critical response ==
Alexander Gilchrist believed that "the metallic tinting of the moss-grown crags is rendered almost as successfully as in 'Newton', and the printing throughout the picture is well carried out, with none of the opaque oily surfaces which occur in some others of the series". Dante Gabriel Rossetti commented: "Crawling on all fours in his shaggy insanity. The tawny beard trails across the left hand: the nails are literally 'like birds' claws', and the flesh tints very red and 'beefy'. The glaring eyes, too, have almost lost their human character. The background represents a thick jungle. A fine wild conception". The image inspired a passage in the poem The City of Dreadful Night (1870s) by James Thomson (1834–1882):

After a hundred steps I grew aware
Of something crawling in the lane below;
It seemed a wounded creature prostrate there
That sobbed with pangs in making progress slow,
The hind limbs stretched to push, the fore limbs then
To drag; for it would die in its own den.

But coming level with it I discerned
That it had been a man; for at my tread
It stopped in its sore travail and half-turned,
Leaning upon its right, and raised its head,
And with the left hand twitched back as in ire
Long grey unreverend locks befouled with mire.

A haggard filthy face with bloodshot eyes,
An infamy for manhood to behold. – Canto XVIII, from line 13
