= Pathros =

Biblical name for Upper Egypt

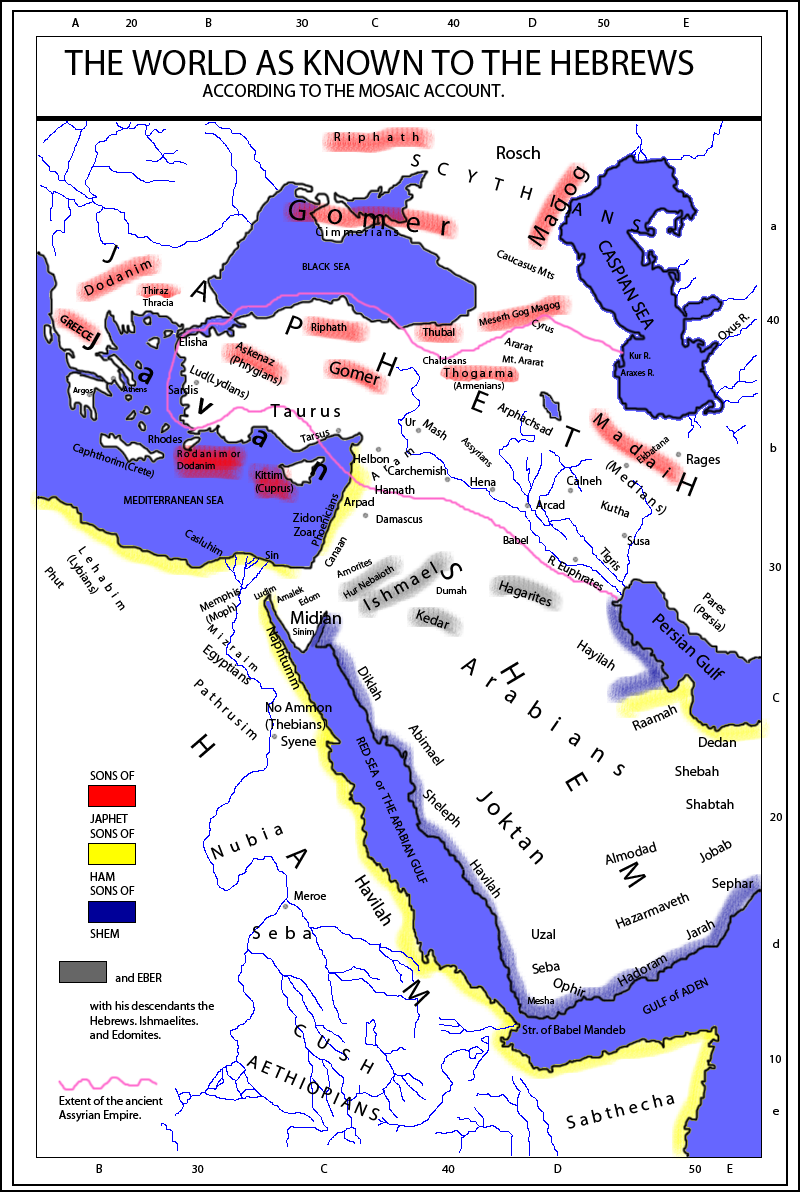
A map of the Generations of Noah, placing the "Pathrusim" in Upper Egypt.

Pathros (Hebrew: פַּתְרוֹס; Paṯrōs; Ancient Greek: Φαθωρῆς, Phathōrēs; Koine Ancient Greek: Παθούρης, Pathourēs) refers to Upper Egypt, primarily the Thebaid where it extended from Elephantine fort to modern Asyut north of Thebes. Gardiner argues it extended to the north no further than Abydos. It is mentioned in the Hebrew Bible in Jeremiah 44:1 and 15; Isaiah 11:11; and Ezekiel 29:14, 30:14. It is the homeland of the "Pathrusim".

The name is a loan from Egyptian pꜣ tꜣ-rsj "the southern land" (e.g., pBritish Museum EA 10375, line 16; cf. Sahidic Coptic ⲡⲁⲧⲟⲩⲣⲏⲥ and Bohairic Coptic ⲡⲁⲑⲟⲩⲣⲏⲥ.)

D1 Z1 M24
tp-rsy
in hieroglyphs

As in Hebrew and Greek, the term was used in Akkadian by the Assyrians as Paturisi, for example in the Annals of Esarhaddon.

== See also ==
- Generations of Noah
