= Siege of Tyre (586–573 BC) =

By the Babylonians under Nebuchadnezzar II

- Part of the Nebuchadnezzar II's wars in the Near East
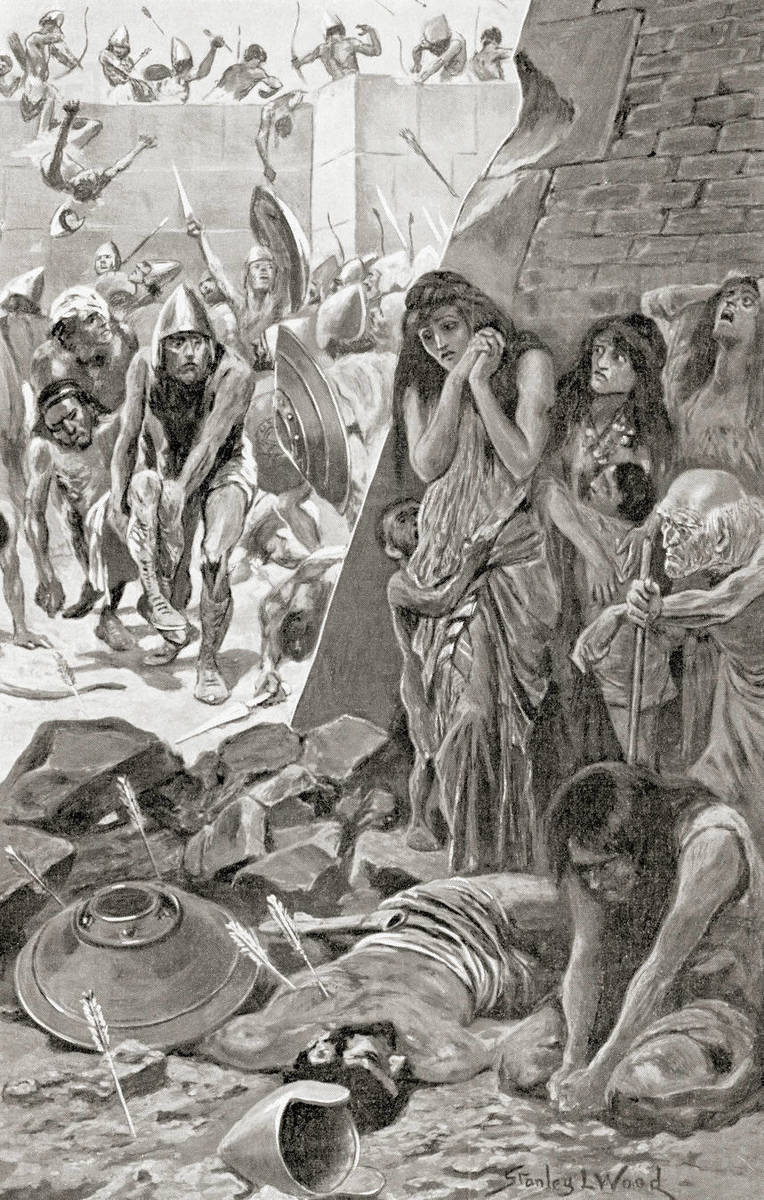
- Tyre besieged by Nebuchadnezzar of Babylon by Stanley Llewellyn Wood (1915)
Date	586–573 BC (13 years)
Location	Tyre, Phoenicia (now Lebanon) 33°16′15″N 35°11′46″E
Result	Babylonian victory

Belligerents
Neo-Babylonian Empire	Tyre

Commanders and leaders
Nebuchadnezzar II	Ithobaal III

Strength
Unknown	Unknown

Casualties and losses
Unknown	High?

The siege of Tyre is usually assumed to have been waged for 13 years from 586 to 573 BC by Nebuchadnezzar II of Babylon. The siege of Tyre, in Phoenicia, has a significant connection to the Book of Ezekiel which in chapter 26 announces that the city will soon fall to the Babylonian forces, while chapter 29 states that the siege was partially unsuccessful. Only Josephus mentions that the siege lasted for 13 years, both in Antiquities of the Jews (Book X.228) and in Against Apion (1.156-159). However, he dates the beginning of the siege to the 7th year of Nebuchadnezzar, which is 598/597 BC.

== Background ==
King Nebuchadnezzar II of the Neo-Babylonian Empire began a campaign of wars in the Near East to solidify his control over the region in the 600s BC after the fall of Assyria. He defeated the Egyptian Army under Pharaoh Necho II in the Battle of Carchemish in 605 BC. Nebuchadnezzar II subjugated Jerusalem in a siege twice: the first siege in 597 BC toppled King Jeconiah and replaced him with Zedekiah, and the second siege from 589 to 586 BC destroyed the Kingdom of Judah and overthrew Zedekiah.

== Siege ==
Little of what occurred during the siege is known as ancient sources regarding the siege do not mention much or have been lost. According to accounts by Saint Jerome in his Commentary on Ezekiel, Nebuchadnezzar II was unable to attack the city with conventional methods, such as using battering rams or siege engines, since Tyre was an island city, so he ordered his soldiers to gather rocks and build a causeway from the mainland to the walls of the island, similar to Alexander the Great's strategy in his siege 250 years later.

After 13 years of siege, the Tyrians negotiated a surrender with the Babylonians. Nebuchadnezzar II was never able to take control of Tyre by military means, leaving the result of the siege as militarily inconclusive. The King of Tyre, Ithobaal III, either died near the end of the siege or was replaced as part of the surrender. He was succeeded by Baal II, who ruled as a vassal to Babylon.

The historicity of the siege was supported by a cuneiform tablet discovered in 1926 by German archeologist Eckhard Unger that discussed food provisions for "the king and his soldiers for their march against Tyre." Other cuneiform tablets also confirm that Tyre came under the control of Nebuchadnezzar II at some point during his reign. Josephus briefly mentions the siege in Antiquities of the Jews (Book X).

== Biblical connections ==
Chapters 26 to 29 of the Book of Ezekiel allude to the siege of Tyre. Passages in these chapters are referred to as "Proclamation Against Tyre," "Lamentation for Tyre," "Proclamation Against the King of Tyre," "Lamentation for the King of Tyre" and "Proclamation Against Egypt".

Ezekiel 26:3-4 states:

[3] Therefore thus says the Lord GOD: ‘Behold, I am against you, O Tyre, and will cause many nations to come up against you, as the sea causes its waves to come up. [4] And they shall destroy the walls of Tyre and break down her towers; I will also scrape her dust from her, and make her like the top of a rock.

The chapter continues:

For thus says the Lord God: "Behold, I will bring against Tyre from the north Nebuchadnezzar king of Babylon, king of kings, with horses, with chariots, and with horsemen, and an army with many people. He will slay with the sword your daughter villages in the fields; he will heap up a siege mound against you, build a wall against you, and raise a defense against you. He will direct his battering rams against your walls, and with his axes he will break down your towers. Because of the abundance of his horses, their dust will cover you; your walls will shake at the noise of the horsemen, the wagons, and the chariots, when he enters your gates, as men enter a city that has been breached. With the hooves of his horses he will trample all your streets; he will slay your people by the sword, and your strong pillars will fall to the ground. They will plunder your riches and pillage your merchandise; they will break down your walls and destroy your pleasant houses; they will lay your stones, your timber, and your soil in the midst of the water.

The description of Nebuchadnezzar's siege in chapter 26 was a prophecy made by the Prophet Ezekiel to the fate of Tyre. Christians and Jews claim that Nebuchadnezzar would only fulfill part of this prophecy, and that the rest would be fulfilled after Alexander's siege.

The structure of Ezekiel chapter 27 may suggest that the Tyrians suffered heavily either during or after the siege, losing many men and luxuries to the Babylonians. Chapter 28 begins as a condemnation of the King of Tyre but later shifts to a lamentation to the King of Tyre. The last verse of the chapter, verse 19, reads "All who knew you among the peoples are astonished at you; You have become a horror, and shall be no more forever" which may allude to the King, Ithobaal III, having been killed.

In chapter 29 of Ezekiel, 16 years after the setting of chapter 26 and after the siege, it is stated that Nebuchadnezzar was not successful in taking New Tyre, though he did manage to subjugate them in formal terms.

Son of man, Nebuchadrezzar king of Babylon caused his army to serve a great service against Tyrus: every head was made bald, and every shoulder was peeled: yet had he no wages, nor his army, for Tyrus, for the service that he had served against it: (Ezekiel 29:18)

The statement, "Every head was made bald, and every shoulder rubbed raw", could be interpreted to mean that the siege did not end in a decisive victory for the Babylonians and that heavy casualties may have been suffered.

=== Structure ===
The structure of chapters 26 and 27 reflect the typical Ezekielian "halving" which is a signature of the prophet. The same pattern of a literal section followed by a lament is used in both chapters 26, 27 and in the two sections of chapter 28, verses 1-10 and 11-19. According to Moshe Greenberg and Daniel Block, it is typical for Ezekiel to use this Diptych structure.

According to Block, the lament of chapter 27 is also internally structured as a diptych:

Ezekiel's habit of “halving” pronouncements is evident as each of these major segments divides further into two parts. A clear break occurs in the first between vv. 11 and 12 as the imagery changes from a metaphoric description of Tyre as a ship, magnificently constructed and handled by the nobility of surrounding nations (vv. 3b–11), to a trade list, apparently representing the ship’s varied and substantial manifest (vv. 12–25).

== See also ==
- List of Sieges of Tyre
- Siege of Jerusalem (587 BC)

== Bibliography ==
- Carter, Terry; Dunston, Lara; Jousiffe, Ann; Jenkins, Siona (2004). Lonely Planet: Syria & Lebanon (2 ed.). Melbourne: Lonely Planet Publications. p. 346. ISBN 1-86450-333-5.
- Ephʿal, Israel (2003). "Nebuchadnezzar the Warrior: Remarks on his Military Achievements". Israel Exploration Journal. 53 (2). Jerusalem: Israel Exploration Society: 178–191. JSTOR 27927044.
- Garstad, Benjamin (2016). "Nebuchadnezzar's Siege of Tyre in Jerome's "Commentary on Ezekiel"". Vigiliae Christianae. 70 (2). Edmonton, Alberta: Brill: 175–192. doi:10.1163/15700720-12341236. JSTOR 24754515.
- Katzenstein, H. Jacob (1979). "Tyre in the Early Persian Period (539–486 B.C.E.)". The Biblical Archaeologist. 42 (1). The University of Chicago Press: 23–34. doi:10.2307/3209545. JSTOR 3209545. S2CID 165757132.
- Moriarty, Frederick L. (1965). "The Lament over Tyre (Ez. 27)". Gregorianum. 46 (1). GBPress – Gregorian Biblical Press: 83–88. JSTOR 23573313.
- Vogelstein, Max (1950–1951). "Nebuchadnezzar's Reconquest of Phoenicia and Palestine and the Oracles of Ezekiel". Hebrew Union College Annual. 23 (2). New York: Hebrew Union College Press: 197–220. JSTOR 23506631.
