= Ithobaal III =

King of Tyre during Nebuchadnezzar II period

Ithobaal III (Latin Ithobalus, Hebrew Ethbaal) was recorded by Josephus as the king on the list of kings of Tyre reigning 591/0–573/2 BCE at the time of the first fall of Jerusalem, and therefore the subject of Ezekiel's cherub in Eden. During his time, Josephus also wrote that Nebuchadnezzar II besieged Tyre for 13 years (Siege of Tyre (586–573 BC)), which probably covered 585 to 573 BC. The precise year it began is difficult to pinpoint, though most scholars believe it began around 586/585 BC and ended around 573 BC. There are even those who proposed an earlier date - around 603-590 - citing that the Babylonians would have attacked it first before launching a campaign against Egypt. However, this theory is considered implausible by historian Josette Elayi. The city, according to the oracles of Ezekiel, was not captured. Ithobaal himself survived the siege with the prophet acknowledging that "King Nebuchadnezzar of Babylon made his army labor hard against Tyre... yet neither he nor his army got anything". “Ithobaal” means “With Baal”, a theophoric name indicating devotion to the Canaanite god Baal.
