= Ezekiel 29 =

Book of Ezekiel, chapter 29

- ← chapter 28 chapter 30 →
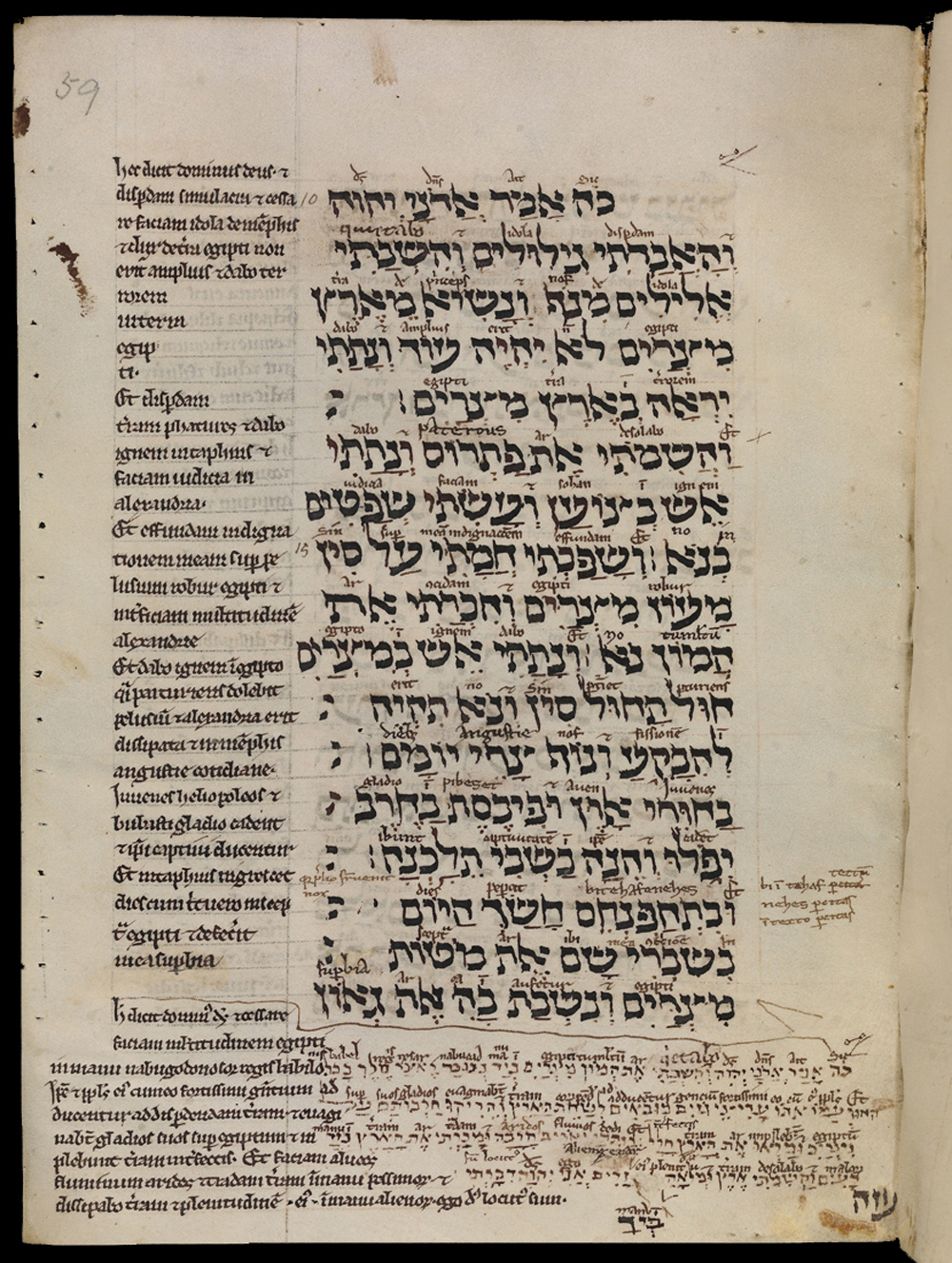
- Book of Ezekiel 30:13–18 in an English manuscript from the early 13th century, MS. Bodl. Or. 62, fol. 59a. A Latin translation appears in the margins with further interlineations above the Hebrew.
- Book: Book of Ezekiel
- Hebrew Bible part: Nevi'im
- Order in the Hebrew part: 7
- Category: Latter Prophets
- Christian Bible part: Old Testament
- Order in the Christian part: 26

Ezekiel 29 is the twenty-ninth chapter of the Book of Ezekiel in the Hebrew Bible or the Old Testament of the Christian Bible. This book contains the prophecies attributed to the prophet/priest Ezekiel and is one of the Books of the Prophets. Chapters 29–32 contain seven oracles against Egypt, balancing the seven oracles against Israel's smaller neighbors in chapters 25–28.

== Text ==
The original text of this chapter was written in the Hebrew language. This chapter is divided into 21 verses.

=== Textual witnesses ===
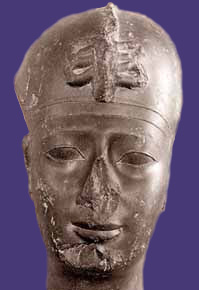
The head of "Apries" or "Pharaoh-Hophra", Louvre

Some early manuscripts containing the text of this chapter in Hebrew are of the Masoretic Text tradition, which includes the Codex Cairensis (895), the Petersburg Codex of the Prophets (916), Aleppo Codex (10th century), and Codex Leningradensis (1008).

There is also a translation into Koine Greek known as the Septuagint, made in the last few centuries BC. Extant ancient manuscripts of the Septuagint version include Codex Vaticanus (B; $\mathfrak{G}$^{B}; 4th century), Codex Alexandrinus (A; $\mathfrak{G}$^{A}; 5th century) and Codex Marchalianus (Q; $\mathfrak{G}$^{Q}; 6th century). (Note: Ezekiel is missing from the extant Codex Sinaiticus.)

== Pharaoh the sea-serpent (29:1–16) ==
In this passage, YHWH calls Pharaoh 'a great sea-serpent' (tannin′, reading as singular, for plural text in MT, "dragon" in the New Revised Standard Version, "monster" in the New King James Version) 'stretched out in the Nile surrounded by fish' (verses 3–4) and as the king of Tyre, Pharaoh is condemned for 'claiming divine status' (in this case, 'as the Nile's creator'), so YHWH announces that 'he will fish out the serpent along with its dependent fishes' (the allies of Egypt) 'and fling them out to rot in the field' (verses 4–5) causing the Egyptians to 'acknowledge YHWH's sovereignty.

=== Verse 1 ===
In the tenth year, in the tenth month, on the twelfth day of the month, the word of the Lord came to me, saying,

The date corresponds to January 7, 587 BCE, based on an analysis by German theologian Bernhard Lang.

=== Verse 2 ===
"Son of man, set your face against Pharaoh king of Egypt, and prophesy against him, and against all Egypt."

- "Son of man" (Hebrew: בן־אדם ḇen-’ā-ḏām): this phrase is used 93 times to address Ezekiel.
- "Pharaoh" (Hebrew: פרעה par-‘ōh; Egyptian: pr-±o, "great house"; Greek: Φαραω, Pharao): the title of ancient Egyptian kings, of royal court, and (in new kingdom) of the king, until the Persian invasion. The title at the time of the prophecy ("January 7, 587 BCE") refers to Hophra (c. 589-570 BC) as noted in Jeremiah 44:30 (Ουαφρη[ς] in the Greek Old Testament), written as Apries (Ancient Greek: Ἁπρίης) by Herodotus (ii. 161) and Diodorus (i. 68), Waphres by Manetho, who correctly records that he reigned for 19 years, the fourth king (counting from Psamtik I) of the Twenty-sixth dynasty of Egypt.

=== Verse 10 ===
Indeed, therefore, I am against you and against your rivers, and I will make the land of Egypt utterly waste and desolate, from Migdol to Syene, as far as the border of Ethiopia.

- "Migdol" or "the tower"

== Nebuchadrezzar's Consolation Prize (29:17–21) ==
This part separates the oracles dated to January 587 BCE (29:1–16) and April 587 BCE (30:20-6) with the insertion of a later prophecy (announced in 571 BCE) that Egypt will be given by YHWH to the Babylonian king as compensation for his efforts on YHWH's behalf in the siege of Tyre (verse 20) which ended in 572 BCE. Egypt's defeat will bring honor to Israel who would then recognize YHWH. In his annals, Nebuchadrezzar recorded his invasion to Egypt in 568 BCE (ANET 308).

=== Verse 17 ===
And it came to pass in the twenty-seventh year, in the first month, on the first day of the month, that the word of the Lord came to me, saying,

The date corresponds to April 26, 571 BCE, based on the analysis of Bernhard Lang.

== See also ==
- Babylon
- Egypt
- Ethiopia
- Israel
- Migdol
- Nebuchadnezzar
- Pathros
- Pharaoh
- Syene
- Tyre
- Related Bible parts: Isaiah 30, Jeremiah 44, Ezekiel 17, Ezekiel 30

== Sources ==
- Bromiley, Geoffrey W. (1995). International Standard Bible Encyclopedia: vol. iv, Q-Z. Eerdmans.
- Brown, Francis; Briggs, Charles A.; Driver, S. R. (1994). The Brown-Driver-Briggs Hebrew and English Lexicon (reprint ed.). Hendrickson Publishers. ISBN 978-1565632066.
- Clements, Ronald E (1996). Ezekiel. Westminster John Knox Press. ISBN 9780664252724.
- Coogan, Michael David (2007). Coogan, Michael David; Brettler, Marc Zvi; Newsom, Carol Ann; Perkins, Pheme (eds.). The New Oxford Annotated Bible with the Apocryphal/Deuterocanonical Books: New Revised Standard Version, Issue 48 (Augmented 3rd ed.). Oxford University Press. ISBN 9780195288810.
- Galambush, J. (2007). "25. Ezekiel". In Barton, John; Muddiman, John (eds.). The Oxford Bible Commentary (first (paperback) ed.). Oxford University Press. pp. 533–562. ISBN 978-0199277186.
- Gesenius, H. W. F. (1979). Gesenius' Hebrew and Chaldee Lexicon to the Old Testament Scriptures: Numerically Coded to Strong's Exhaustive Concordance, with an English Index. Translated by Tregelles, Samuel Prideaux (7th ed.). Baker Book House.
- Joyce, Paul M. (2009). Ezekiel: A Commentary. Continuum. ISBN 9780567483614.
- Kee, Howard Clark; Meyers, Eric M.; Rogerson, John; Levine, Amy-Jill; Saldarini, Anthony J. (2008). Chilton, Bruce (ed.). The Cambridge Companion to the Bible (2, revised ed.). Cambridge University Press. ISBN 9780521691406.
- Würthwein, Ernst (1995). The Text of the Old Testament. Translated by Rhodes, Erroll F. Grand Rapids, MI: Wm. B. Eerdmans. ISBN 0-8028-0788-7.
