= Nebuchadnezzar Chronicle =

One of the series of Babylonian Chronicles

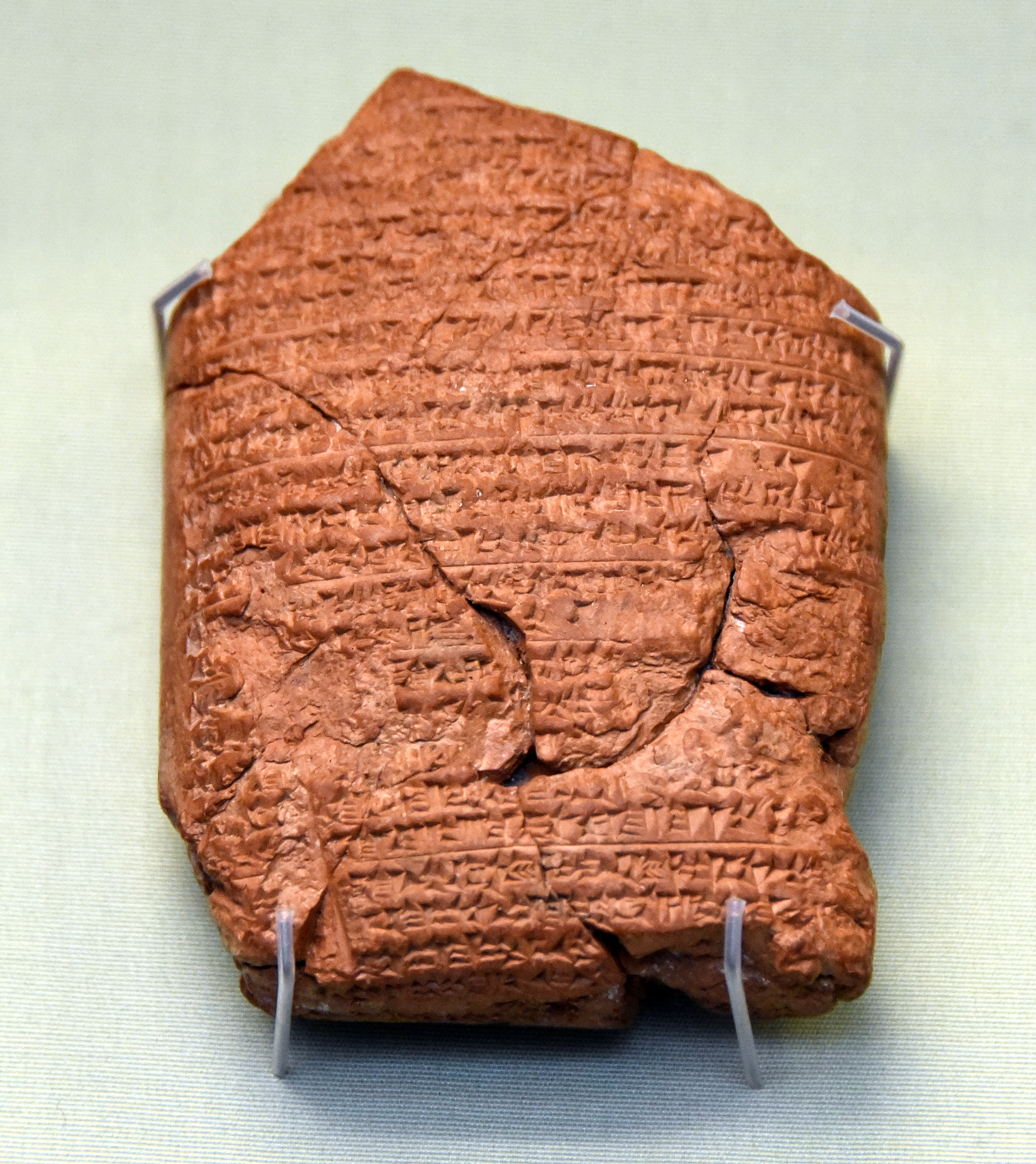
- The cuneiform inscription on this clay tablet highlights the conquest of Jerusalem by Nebuchadnezzar II and the surrender of Jehoiachin (Jeconiah), king of Judah, in 597 BC. From Babylon, Iraq
- Material: Clay
- Created: c. 595 BC
- Discovered: 1896
- Present location: London, England, United Kingdom

The Nebuchadnezzar Chronicle, also known as Jerusalem Chronicle, is one of the series of Babylonian Chronicles, and contains a description of the first eleven years of the reign of Nebuchadnezzar II. The tablet details Nebuchadnezzar's military campaigns in the west and has been interpreted to refer to both the Battle of Carchemish and the Siege of Jerusalem (597 BC). The tablet is numbered ABC5 in Grayson's standard text and BM 21946 in the British Museum.

It is one of two identified Chronicles referring to Nebuchadnezzar, and does not cover the whole of his reign. The ABC5 is a continuation of Babylonian Chronicle ABC4 (The Late Years of Nabopolassar), where Nebuchadnezzar is mentioned as the Crown Prince. Since the ABC 5 only provides a record through Nebuchadnezzar's eleventh year, the subsequent destruction and exile recorded in the Hebrew Bible to have taken place ten years later are not covered in the chronicles or elsewhere in the archaeological record.

As with most other Babylonian Chronicles, the tablet is unprovenanced, having been purchased in 1896 via an antiquities dealer from an unknown excavation. It was first published 60 years later in 1956 by Donald Wiseman.

== Carchemish ==
The tablet claims that Nebuchadnezzar "crossed the river to go against the Egyptian army which lay in Karchemiš. They fought with each other and the Egyptian army withdrew before him. He accomplished their defeat and beat them to non-existence. As for the rest of the Egyptian army which had escaped from the defeat so quickly that no weapon had reached them, in the district of Hamath the Babylonian troops overtook and defeated them so that not a single man escaped to his own country. At that time Nebuchadnezzar conquered the whole area of Hamath."

== Siege of Jerusalem ==
The Chronicle does not refer to Jerusalem directly but mentions a "City of Iaahudu", interpreted to be "City of Judah". The Chronicle states:

In the seventh year (of Nebuchadnezzar) in the month Chislev (Nov/Dec) the king of Babylon assembled his army, and after he had invaded the land of Hatti (Turkey/Syria) he laid siege to the city of Judah. On the second day of the month of Adar (16 March) he conquered the city and took the king (Jeconiah) prisoner. He installed in his place a king (Zedekiah) of his own choice, and after he had received rich tribute, he sent forth to Babylon.

== Chronology ==
The Chronicle is understood to confirm the date of the First Siege of Jerusalem. Prior to publication of the Babylonian Chronicles by Donald Wiseman in 1956, Thiele had determined from the biblical texts that Nebuchadnezzar's initial capture of Jerusalem occurred in the spring of 597 BC, while other scholars, including Albright, more frequently dated the event to 598 BC.

There are no extra-biblical sources for the Second Siege of Jerusalem, which has been dated to 587 BC. The date was arrived at by comparing the evidence of the Chronicle to dates given in the Book of Ezekiel in connection to the year of captivity of Jeconiah (i.e. the first fall of Jerusalem).
