= Yehud (Babylonian province) =

Province of the Neo-Babylonian Empire

Judea Yehud
- Province of the Neo-Babylonian Empire
- c. 586 BCE–c. 539 BCE
- Capital: Mizpah
- Area
  - Coordinates: 31°47′N 35°13′E
- Historical era: Neo-Babylonian Empire
  - Siege of Jerusalem (587 BC): c. 586 BCE
  - Persian conquest of Babylon: c. 539 BCE
Preceded by	Succeeded by
Kingdom of Judah	Yehud Medinata

Yehud was a province of the Neo-Babylonian Empire established in the former territories of the Kingdom of Judah, which was destroyed by the Babylonians in the aftermath of the Judahite revolts and the siege of Jerusalem in 587/6 BCE. It first existed as a Jewish administrative division under Gedaliah ben Aḥikam.

After the collapse of the Neo-Babylonian Empire in 539 BCE, the province was absorbed into the Persian Achaemenid Empire as a self-governing Jewish region called Yehud Medinata.

== Background ==
In the late 7th century BCE Judah became a vassal kingdom of the Neo-Babylonian Empire; however, there were rival factions at the court in Jerusalem, some supporting loyalty to Babylon, others urging rebellion. In the early years of the 6th century, despite the strong remonstrances of the prophet Jeremiah and others, king Zedekiah revolted against Nebuchadnezzar II and entered into an alliance with pharaoh Hophra of Egypt. The revolt failed, and in 597 BCE many Judahites, including the prophet Ezekiel, were exiled to Babylon. A few years later Judah revolted yet again. In 589 Nebuchadnezzar again besieged Jerusalem, and many Jews fled to Moab, Ammon, Edom and other countries to seek refuge. The city fell after an eighteen-month siege and Nebuchadnezzar again pillaged and destroyed Jerusalem and burned the Temple. Thus, by 586 BCE much of Judah was devastated, the royal family, the priesthood, and the scribes—the country's elite—were in exile in Babylon, and much of the population still in neighbouring countries. The former kingdom suffered a steep decline of both economy and population.

Even though Jerusalem and its immediate surroundings were destroyed, along with settlements in the western part of the kingdom, the region of Benjamin, north of Jerusalem, survived the onslaught and became the center of the Babylonian province of Yehud, with Mizpah as its capital.

== History ==
=== Babylonian period (587–539 BCE) ===
After the fall of Jerusalem, the former kingdom of Judah became a Babylonian province. According to Miller and Hayes, the province included the towns of Bethel in the north, Mizpah, Jericho in the east, Jerusalem, Beth-Zur in the west and En-Gedi in the south. Jerusalem being in ruins, Mizpah was the administrative center of the province. Gedaliah, a native Judahite but not of the royal Davidic dynasty, was appointed governor (or possibly ruling as a puppet king). On hearing of the appointment, the Jews that had taken refuge in surrounding countries returned to Judah.

However, Ishmael ben Nethaniah, a member of the former royal house, assassinated Gedaliah and had the Babylonian garrison killed, triggering - according to a couple of short passages taken at face value by Miller & Hayes and others - a mass movement of refugees to Egypt. A minor fast day, the Fast of Gedaliah, commemorates this event. In Egypt, the refugees settled in Migdol, Tahpanhes, Noph, and Pathros, and Jeremiah went with them as moral guardian.

Lipschits refutes this interpretation, pointing out to both the fact that the Septuagint and the Qumran fragment 4QJer^{b} do not contain the words indicating an emptying of the land as found in Jeremiah 43:5, which points to them being a late addition; and to the archaeological testimony for the continued settlement in Benjamin and northern Mount Judah after the destruction of Jerusalem and the First Temple in 586 BCE.

== Demographics ==
The numbers deported to Babylon or who made their way to Egypt, and the remnant that remained in Yehud province and in surrounding countries, is subject to academic debate. The Book of Jeremiah reports that a total of 4,600 were exiled to Babylon. To these numbers must be added those deported by Nebuchadnezzar in 597 BCE following the first siege to Jerusalem, when he deported the king of Judah, Jeconiah, and his court and other prominent citizens and craftsmen, along with a sizable portion of the Jewish population of Judah, numbering about 10,000. The Book of Kings also suggests that it was eight thousand. Israel Finkelstein, a prominent archaeologist, suggests that the 4,600 represented the heads of households and 8,000 was the total, whilst 10,000 is a rounding upwards of the second number. Jeremiah also hints that an equivalent number may have fled to Egypt. Given these figures, Finkelstein suggests that 3/4 of the population of Judah had remained.

In his examination of the archaeological evidence for the demography of Yehud during the 6th century BCE, archaeologist Avraham Faust states that between the deportations and executions caused by the Babylonians, plus the famines and epidemics that occurred during the war, the population of Judah was reduced to barely a 10% of what it had been in the time before the Exile.

== See also ==
- History of the Jews and Judaism in the Land of Israel
