= Al-Yahudu Tablets =

Collection of archaeological artifacts

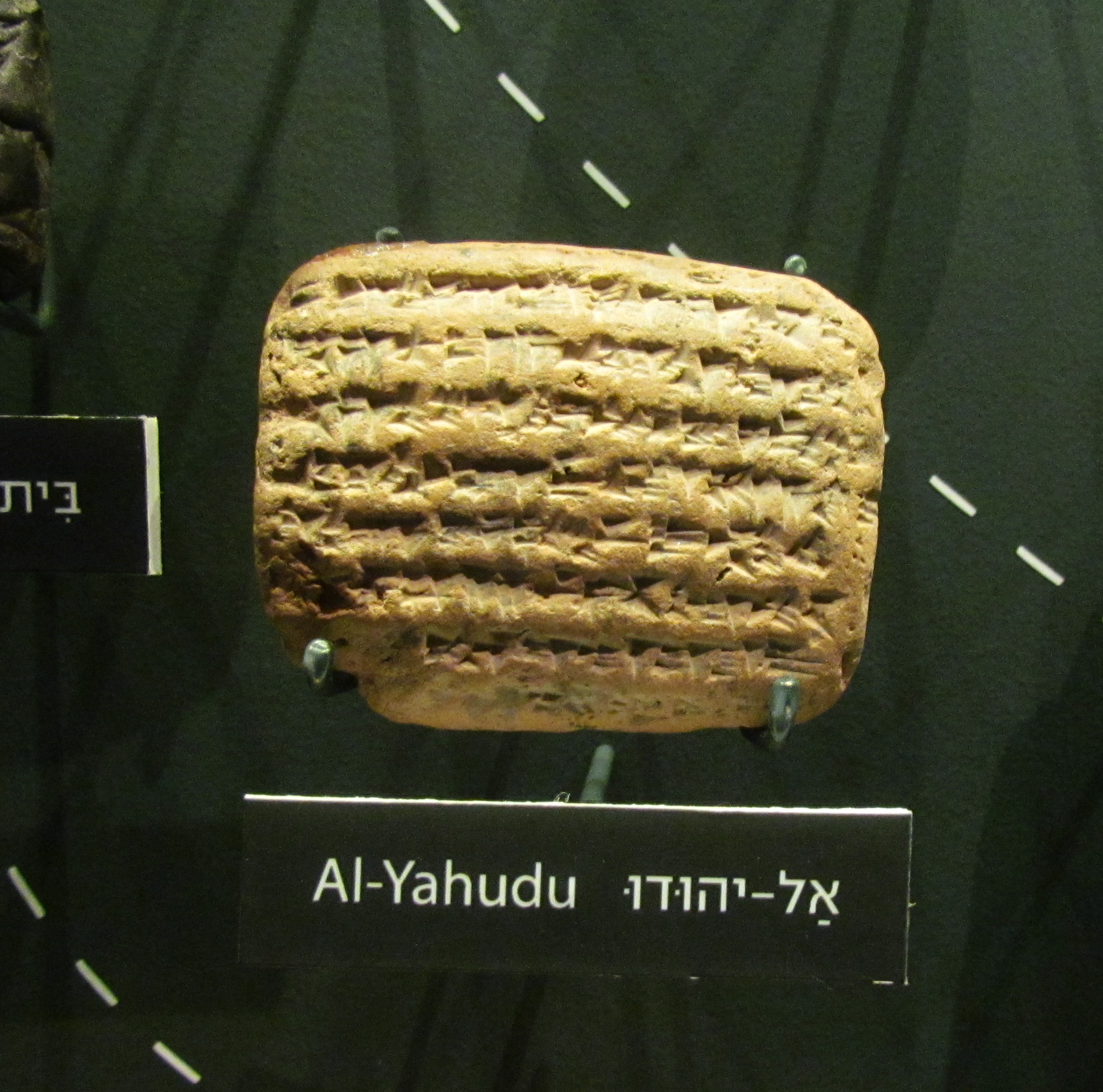
Al-Yahudu Tablets

The Al-Yahudu tablets are a collection of about 200 clay tablets from the sixth and fifth centuries BCE on the exiled Judean community in Babylonia following the destruction of the First Temple. They contain information on the physical condition of the exiles from Judah and their financial condition in southern Babylonia. The tablets are named after the central settlement mentioned in the documents, āl Yahudu (Akkadian "The town of Judah"), which was "presumably in the vicinity of Borsippa".

The earliest document in the collection dates back to 572 BCE, about 15 years after the destruction of the Temple, during the reign of Nebuchadnezzar II. The most recent tablet dates back to 477 BCE, during the reign of Xerxes I, about 60 years after the Return to Zion began and about 20 years before the rise of Ezra the Scribe.

== The Texts ==
The Āl-Yahūdu tablets are unprovenanced having entered the antiquities market by unknown means, possibly looting. They are held in private collections, primarily the David and Cindy Sofer Collection and including the Percy J. Wiseman collection, which has now been acquired by the British Museum.The tablets revolve around the town of Āl-Yahūdu, ‘City of the Judeans’ (also Ālu ša Yāhūdāya and Āl-Yāhūdāya) which is near Ālu ša Našar (‘Town of Našar’) and Bīt-Našar (‘House of Našar’). Āl-Yahūdu is part of an administrative unit called "šušānu Yahūdāya", (‘unit of Judean state dependents’) which was used for taxing and conscripting of Judeans. It has been suggested that it was near Babylon, or near Borsippa, or even near Nippur in the south where a number of exiles were settled. Other towns where Judean exiles were settled in central and southern Mesopotamia included toponyms such as Tel-Aviv, Tel-Melah, and Tel-Harsha. The tablets first came to public attention with the publication of 8 tablets in 1996 and 3 in 1999. A large number of texts were published in 2014. The remainder of known texts was published in 2022.

While the texts date to the period from 572 BCE to 477 BCE almost all come from the later portion when the area was under Persian control, primarily during the reign of Darius I who ruled from 522 BCE until 486 BCE. Of the roughly 200 known texts only 14 come from the period of Neo-Babylonian control and of those only 3 came from during the reign of Nebuchadnezzar II (605-562 BCE). For context the Fall of Jeruselum occurred in 587 BCE. It cannot be certain if some deportations from Judea occurred somewhat before or after that date.

== The localities mentioned in the documents ==
Beyond the settlement of al-Yahudu, other settlements were mentioned where Jews were living or working. Some of them are well-known cities and some were apparently satellite settlements of al-Yahudu. The main localities mentioned in the documents are:

- Al-Yahudu: The dominant settlement in the documents. The most ancient document in the collection, dated 572 BC, is called Al-Yahudiyya ("City of the Jews").
- Beit Nashar: Apparently not far from al-Yahudu. A mixed community, where Jews also lived. The ruler of the settlement, which appears in many of the documents, was Ahikar ben Riemot.
- House of Aviram: Although this locality is located in connection with al-Yahudu, there were no Jews with Jewish names and it is unclear whether Jews lived there. The person with the most mentions in this locality is Zbava Sher-Ozer, an administrator for the heir to the Babylonian throne.
- The village of Ubu Sha Tubiyama: Possibly named after the village's founder, Tuviyahu ben Mukhaiahu.

== Life of Jews in Babylon as reflected in the documents ==
=== Status of exiles ===
According to the documents, the Jews were defined as "Shushanu". This status is also known from other documents from the period and relates to foreign exiles who were exiled to Babylon, mainly in order to rehabilitate cities and areas devastated by past wars. These exiles received land lease for their livelihood in the form of service in exchange for land. Although they can be compared to the status of land-bound tenants, they seem to have enjoyed freedom of movement, they were defined as independent entities before the Babylonian and Persian law and enjoyed the possibilities of social and economic integration.

=== Service for the Kingdom ===
The type of service required of the exiles is mentioned in the documents, both in the context of the designation of the leasehold lands and directly in the jobs that the exiles were required to perform as part of the payment of taxes. Based on other documents dealing with payment of tax and service to the kingdom after their settlement, it seems that other exiles were employed in physical labor. These included construction work, excavation and maintenance of irrigation channels. It is possible that among these were many of the "plow and locksmith", mentioned in connection with the exile of Jeconiah in 597 BCE. The nature of the service described also appears to indicate a restriction imposed on them in their movement, and to a certain extent may have been in this period a status similar to that of a slave. This period may be reflected in the famous lines of Psalm 137 on the exile.

=== Social and economic integration ===
Most of the Jews on the certificates made their living from agriculture. Most of the land they leased grew dates and barley, but wheat, spices and linen were also mentioned in the documents. Analysis of the money amounts in the transactions appearing in the certificates shows that they had a low economic status relative to the kingdom. A comparison of the economic agreements from other collections in Babylon indicates the integration of the Jews into the economic life of Babylon, and it seems that they operated on the daily economic level, like other Babylonians, and not necessarily according to the laws of the Torah.

Among the exiles, there are documents of a number of Jews of strong economic standing. Some (such as Raphaiah Ben Smachiho and his son) acted as intermediaries and credit providers to the Jewish population and managed to accumulate substantial capital. These intermediaries provided pure silver coins to concentrate tax payments of various Jews and provided farmers with means of production, such as plowing animals and grain.

=== Babylonized naming conventions ===
The Al-Yahudu Tablets provide among the first Babylonian transcriptions of Israelite names. Earlier, the Assyrians, whom the Babylonians had conquered, had made several inscriptions which featured names of Israelite or Judahite provenance, including Omri, Hezekiah, Pekah and Hoshea, Jehoiachin, and Yahu-Bihdi. In particular, the common Hebrew theophoric elements Yah- and -yahu are variously transliterated as ya-ma and ya-ḫu, instead of the historic Assyrian form ya-ú.

== See also ==
- Babylonian Exile
- Babylonian Jews
- Elephantine papyri and ostraca
