= Siege of Jerusalem (587 BC) =

Babylonian siege of Jerusalem (587 BC)

Coordinates: 31.783°N 35.217°E

- Part of the Jewish–Babylonian War
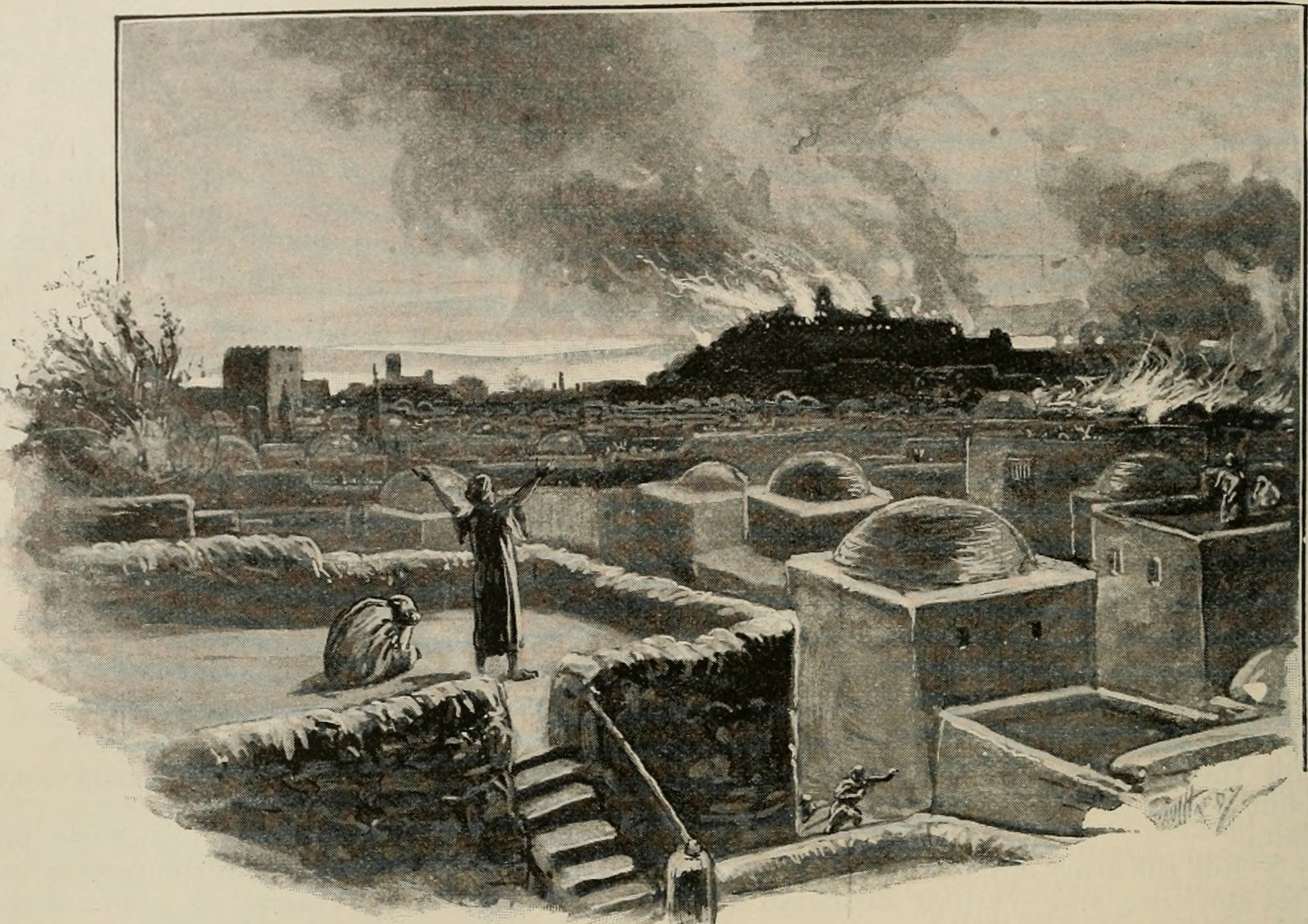
- Jerusalem is on fire (The Art Bible, 1896)
Date	589–587 BC
Location	Jerusalem, Judah
Result	Babylonian victory
Territorial changes	Judah becomes a Babylonian province

Belligerents
Kingdom of Judah	Neo-Babylonian Empire

Commanders and leaders
Zedekiah (surrendered)	Nebuchadnezzar II

Strength
Unknown	Unknown

Casualties and losses
Many slain, 4,200 others taken to captivity	Unknown

Jerusalem was besieged from 589–587 BC, marking the final phase of Judah's revolts against Babylon. Nebuchadnezzar II, king of the Neo-Babylonian Empire, besieged Judah's capital city for approximately 30 months. The city ultimately fell in the summer of 587 BC, after which the Babylonians systematically destroyed Jerusalem and razed Solomon's Temple. The kingdom was dissolved, and a large segment of the population was exiled to Babylonia.

During the late 7th century BC, Judah became a vassal kingdom of Babylon. In 601 BC, Jehoiakim, king of Judah, revolted against Babylonian rule despite the strong remonstrances of the prophet Jeremiah. Jehoiakim died for reasons unclear, and was succeeded by his son, Jeconiah. In 597 BC, the Babylonians besieged Jerusalem, and the city surrendered. Nebuchadnezzar pillaged Jerusalem and deported Jeconiah and other prominent citizens to Babylon; Jeconiah's uncle, Zedekiah, was installed as king. Later, encouraged by the Egyptians, Zedekiah launched a second revolt, and a Babylonian army was sent to retake Jerusalem.

On Tisha B'Av, July 587 or 586 BC, the Babylonians took Jerusalem, destroyed the First Temple and burned down the city. The small settlements surrounding the city, and those close to the western border of the kingdom, were destroyed as well. According to the Bible, Zedekiah attempted to escape, but was captured near Jericho. He was forced to watch the execution of his sons in Riblah, and his eyes were then put out.

The destruction of Jerusalem and its temple triggered a profound religious, political, and cultural crisis. It left a lasting imprint on biblical literature, notably on prophetic writings. The Kingdom of Judah was abolished and annexed as a Babylonian province with its center in Mizpah. The Judean elite, including the Davidic dynasty, were exiled to Babylon. After Babylon had fallen to Cyrus the Great, founder of the Persian Achaemenid Empire, in 539 BC, he allowed the exiled Judeans to return to Zion and rebuild Jerusalem. The Second Temple was completed in 516 BC under the leadership of Zerubbabel. Centuries later, the city and the temple would again face destruction—this time by the Romans during the First Jewish Revolt in 70 AD.

== Background ==
Following the destruction and fall of the northern Kingdom of Israel by the Assyrian Empire in 732 and 720 BC, Judah lost its sibling Israelite kingdom. Judah had already become a vassal of the Assyrians in 734 BC, when King Ahaz of Judah appealed to Tiglath-Pileser III for military assistance. By accepting Assyrian dominance, Judah retained its monarchy and local administration, surviving as one of the few kingdoms to endure the Assyrian conquest of the Levant in the late 8th century BC.

With the decline of the Neo-Assyrian Empire in the late seventh century BC, the Kingdom of Judah found itself caught between two rival powers: Egypt, then under the Twenty-sixth Dynasty, and the rising Neo-Babylonian Empire. The Egyptians filled the vacuum and briefly dominated the region until the Babylonians under Nebuchadnezzar II defeated Egypt at the Battle of Carchemish in 605 BC. Between 604 and 603 BC, Nebuchadnezzar conquered the entire Levant, and Judah, which had previously been a vassal of Assyria and then Egypt, became a vassal state of the Neo-Babylonian Empire.

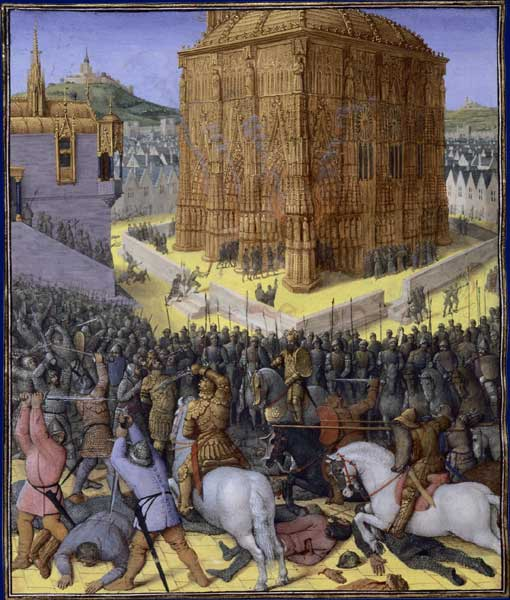
The Capture of Jerusalem by Nebuchadnezzar

== Biblical narrative ==
Whereas the Nebuchadnezzar Chronicle provides information about the siege of Jerusalem in 597 BC, the only known records of the siege that culminated in Jerusalem's destruction in 587 BC are found in the Hebrew Bible.

=== Background ===
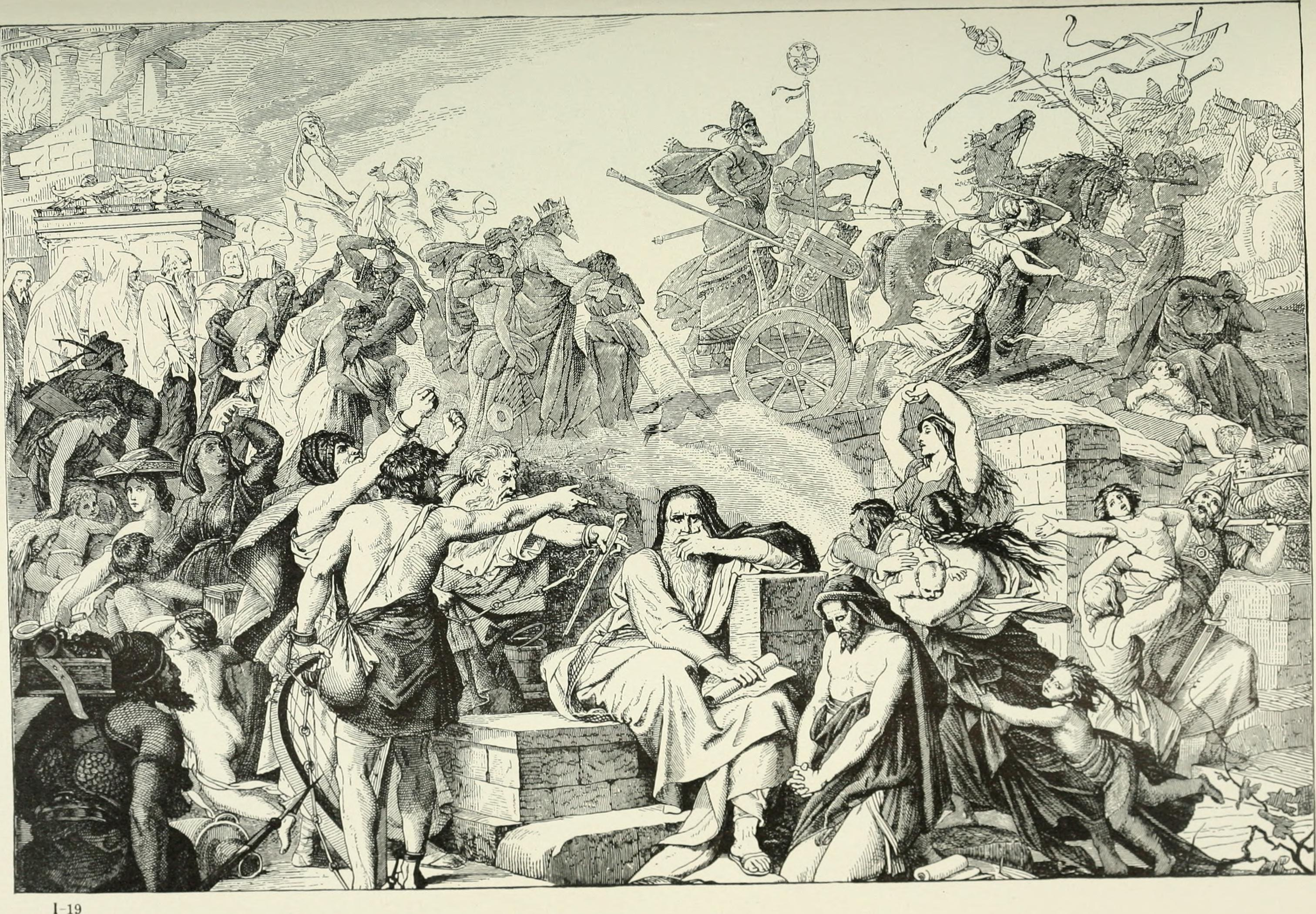
The Jews are led away into prison in Babylon. The city is on fire, and the Ark of the Covenant is taken. Wood engraving after the original painting by Eduard Bendemann (1872)

In 601 BC, during the fourth year of his reign, Nebuchadnezzar II unsuccessfully attempted to invade Egypt and was repulsed with heavy losses. The failure led to numerous rebellions among the Kingdoms of the Levant which owed allegiance to Babylon, including the Kingdom of Judah, where King Jehoiakim stopped paying tribute to Nebuchadnezzar II and took a pro-Egyptian position.

In 597 BC, Nebuchadnezzar II laid siege to Jerusalem. Jehoiakim died during the siege and was succeeded by his son Jeconiah at an age of either eight or eighteen. The city fell about three months later, on 2 Adar (March 16) 597 BC. Nebuchadnezzar II pillaged both Jerusalem and the Temple and carted all of his spoils to Babylon. Jeconiah and his court and other prominent citizens and craftsmen, along with a sizable portion of the Jewish population of Judah. According to the Book of Kings, about 10,000 were deported from the land and dispersed throughout the Babylonian Empire.

Nebuchadnezzar II installed Jeconiah's uncle, Zedekiah as vassal king of Judah, at the age of 21. However, despite the strong remonstrances of Jeremiah and others, Zedekiah revolted against Nebuchadnezzar II by ceasing to pay tribute to him and entered an alliance with Pharaoh Hophra. Nebuchadnezzar II returned to Judah, aiming to capture Jerusalem (2 Kings 25:1).

=== Siege ===
Nebuchadnezzar began a siege of Jerusalem in January 589 BC. Many Jews fled to surrounding Moab, Ammon, Edom and other kingdoms to seek refuge. The Bible describes the city as enduring horrible deprivation during the siege (2 Kings 25:3; Lamentations 4:4, 5, 9). The city fell after a siege, which lasted either eighteen or thirty months. In the eleventh year of Zedekiah's reign (2 Kings 25:2; Jeremiah 39:2), Nebuchadnezzar broke through Jerusalem's walls, conquering the city. Zedekiah and his followers attempted to escape but were captured on the plains of Jericho and taken to Riblah. There, Zedekiah's followers, including his own sons, were executed. After being forced to watch their executions, Zedekiah had his eyes gouged out and was taken captive to Babylon (2 Kings 25:1–7; 2 Chronicles 36:12; Jeremiah 32:4–5; 34:2–3; 39:1–7; 52:4–11), where he remained a prisoner until his death.

=== Aftermath ===
According to the Bible, following the fall of Jerusalem, the Babylonian general Nebuzaradan was sent to complete its destruction. The city and Solomon's Temple were plundered and destroyed, and most of the Judeans were taken by Nebuzaradan into captivity in Babylon, with only a few people permitted to remain to tend to the land (Jeremiah 52:16). Archaeological evidence confirms that the city was systematically destroyed by fire. Archeological evidence also indicates that towns close to the kingdom's western border and small villages in Jerusalem's near vicinity were destroyed.

Gedaliah, a Judean, was made governor of the remnant of Judah, the Yehud Province, with a Chaldean guard stationed at Mizpah (2 Kings 25:22–24; Jeremiah 40:6–8). The Bible reports that, on hearing this news, Jews who had fled to Moab, Ammon, Edom, and in other countries returned to Judah (Jeremiah 40:11–12). Gedaliah was assassinated by Ishmael son of Nethaniah two months later, and the population that had remained and those who had returned then fled to Egypt for safety (2 Kings 25:25–26, Jeremiah 43:5–7). In Egypt, they settled in Migdol (it is uncertain where the Bible is referring to here, probably somewhere in the Nile Delta), Tahpanhes, Memphis (called Noph), and Pathros in the vicinity of Thebes (Jeremiah 44:1).

In Babylonia, the exiles from Judah retained a strong sense of identity and, while integrating into the local society, continued to be recognized as "the people from Judah"—the Jews.

== Dating ==
There has been some debate as to when Nebuchadnezzar's second siege of Jerusalem took place. According to the Hebrew Bible, the city fell in the fourth month of Zedekiah's eleventh year. It is agreed that Jerusalem fell the second time in the summer month of Tammuz (as recorded in Jeremiah 52:6). However, scholars disagree as to whether this dates to 586 BC or 587 BC. William F. Albright dated the end of Zedekiah's reign and the fall of Jerusalem to 587 BC whereas Edwin R. Thiele offered 586 BC. In 2004, Rodger Young published an analysis in which he identified 587 BC for the end of the siege, based on details from the Bible and neo-Babylonian sources for related events.

=== 586 BC ===
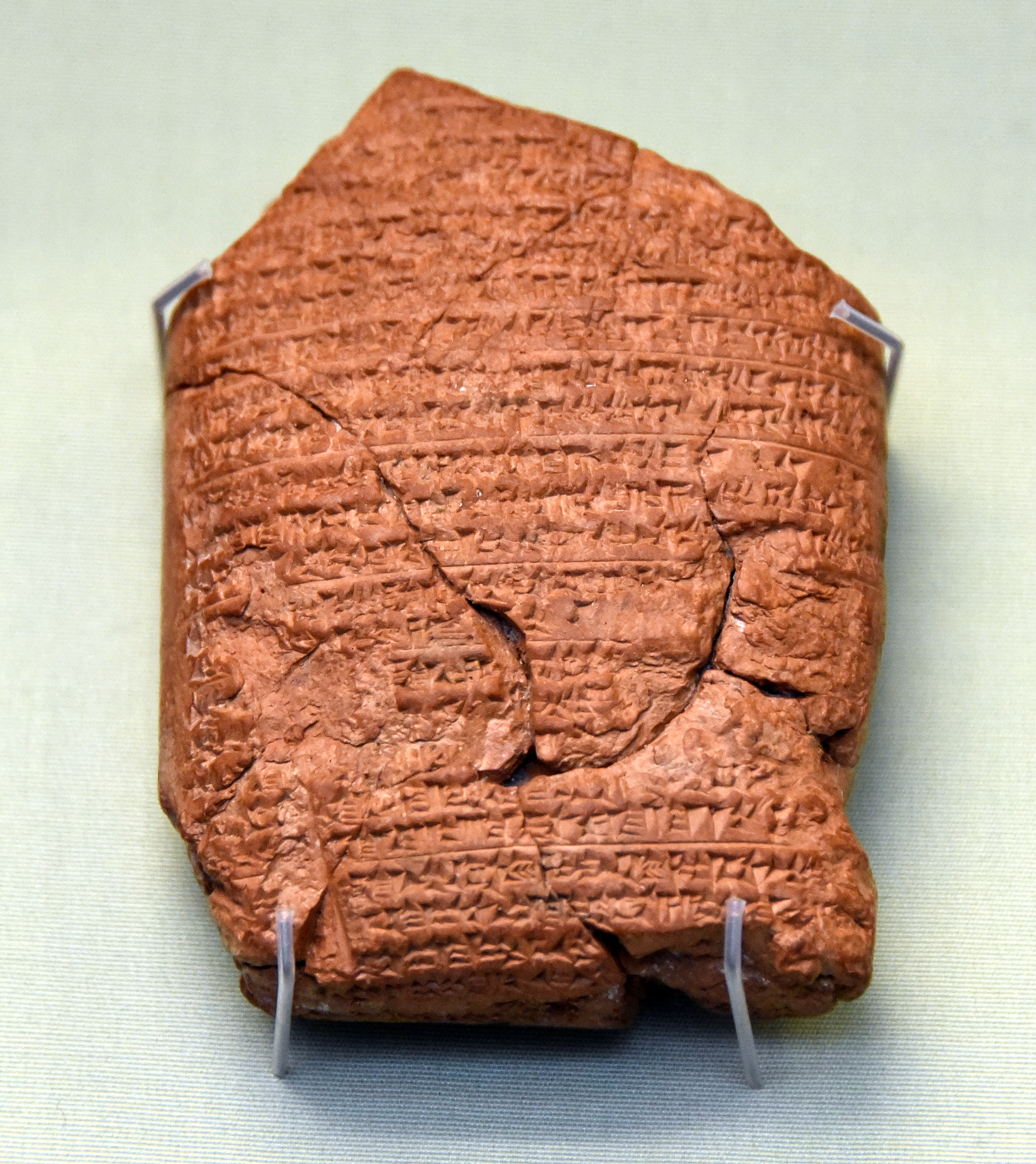
The inscription on this clay tablet highlights the conquest of Jerusalem by Nebuchadnezzar II and the surrender of Jehoiakim in 597 BC

Thiele's reckoning is based on the presentation of Zedekiah's reign on an accession basis, which he asserts was occasionally used for the kings of Judah. In that case, the year that Zedekiah came to the throne would be his zeroth year; his first full year would be 597/596 BC, and his eleventh year, the year that Jerusalem fell, would be 587/586 BC. Since Judah's regnal years were counted from Tishri in autumn, that would place the end of his reign and the capture of Jerusalem in the summer of 586 BC.

=== 587 BC ===
The Nebuchadnezzar Chronicle (BM 21946), published in 1956, indicates that Nebuchadnezzar captured Jerusalem the first time putting an end to the reign of Jehoaichin, on 2 Adar (16 March) 597 BC, in Nebuchadnezzar's seventh year. Jeremiah 52:28–29 gives the relative periods for the end of the two sieges as Nebuchadnezzar's seventh and eighteenth years, respectively. (The same events are described at 2 Kings 24:12 and 2 Kings 25:8 as occurring in Nebuchadnezzar's eighth and nineteenth years, including his accession year.) Identification of Nebuchadnezzar's eighteenth year for the end of the siege places the event in the summer of 587 BC, which is consistent with all three relevant biblical sources—Jeremiah, Ezekiel, and 2 Kings.

== Archeological evidence ==
=== Jerusalem ===
Archaeological evidence supports the biblical account that Jerusalem was destroyed in 587 or 586 BC. Archaeological research has shown that the Babylonians systematically destroyed the city with fire and that the city wall was pulled down.

The remains of three residential structures excavated in the City of David (the Burnt Room, House of Ahiel, and House of Bullae) contain burned wooden beams from a fire started by the Babylonians in the early 6th century BC. Ash and burnt wood beams were also discovered at several structures in the Givati Parking Lot, which the archeologists associated with the traditional dating of the city's destruction in 586 BC. Arrowheads of the socketed bronze trilobate type, associated with the destruction of cities in the Assyrian heartland by the Babylonians and the Medes, likewise first appear in the Southern Levant in the burnt layers associated with Nebuchadnezzar II's destruction of the city. Samples of soil and fragments of a plaster floor recovered from one of the structures indicate that it was exposed to a temperature of at least 600 °C. A number of wine jars were found to contain remains of vanilla, indicating that the spice was used by the Jerusalemite elite before destruction of the city.

=== Surrounding areas ===
Archaeological investigations and surveys have also revealed that, about the time the Babylonians came to besiege Jerusalem, the majority of towns surrounding Jerusalem and along the kingdom's western frontier were also completely destroyed. However, it is unclear if the array of outlying communities to the east and south of the kingdom were destroyed at that time or if it was a continuous process that occurred after the collapse of the administrative structure of the kingdom and the loss of its military force.

The region of Benjamin, located in the northern Judean hill country was mostly unaffected by the invasion and became the center of the Babylonian province of Yehud, with Mizpah as its administrative center.

== Aftermath ==
=== Development of the Jewish diaspora ===
In Babylon, the Jewish exiles were settled in various communities in the Nippur Valley, in modern Iraq. They were not slaves in chains but rather deported populations expected to live as ordinary residents under Babylonian authority, albeit far from their homeland. Evidence from Babylonian texts, the Al-Yahudu Tablets, indicates that some Jewish communities were established in villages named after their place of origin, sometimes referred to as the "city of Judah" or "city of the Jews," and individuals with Yahwistic names appear in legal and economic records, suggesting they were integrated into broader Babylonian society while preserving their heritage. Many exiles participated in agriculture and held minor administrative roles, which likely reduced the need for return.

Archaeological and documentary evidence from the diaspora community at the Elephantine colony in Egypt indicates similar patterns: exiled Jews maintained their religious traditions (including the construction of their own temple), participated in local economic activities, held property, and sought to observe Passover.

The former territories of Judah, meanwhile, underwent a "major disruption": its population dropped from roughly 110,000 to somewhere between 15,000 and 40,000 through deportations, wartime deaths, and flight abroad.

=== Return to Zion ===
The period of Babylonian rule lasted about 48 years. In 539 BC, the Babylonian Empire fell to Cyrus the Great, founder of the Achaemenid Persian Empire. Cyrus issued a decree allowing exiled peoples to return to their homelands. Accordingly, groups of Jewish exiles, now subjects of the Persian Empire, were permitted to return to Jerusalem and Judah beginning in 538 BC. Under the leadership of figures such as Zerubbabel, a descendant of David appointed governor of Judah, and the High Priest Joshua, they rebuilt Jerusalem on a modest scale and reconstructed the Second Temple on the site of the first, completing it by 516 BC. Thus, the First Temple period, which had ended with the destruction in 587/6, gave way to the Second Temple period in Jewish history. Judah remained a small client entity under Persian and Hellenistic overlords, and it would not see an independent kingdom again until the rise of the Hasmoneans many centuries later.

== Long-term impact ==
The destruction of Jerusalem in 587 BC was a defining moment in the development of Judaism, shaping religious thought for generations. It introduced the view that national disaster stemmed from collective sin and divine judgment—faithfulness to God brought security, while disobedience led to exile. Nevertheless, the prophets upheld that God's covenant endured, and that repentance could lead to restoration. This hope seemed fulfilled when the exiled Jews were allowed to return and rebuild the Temple under Persian rule. The trauma of 587 BC, and the theological responses it inspired, became deeply rooted in Jewish tradition, influencing later understandings of suffering, exile, and return.

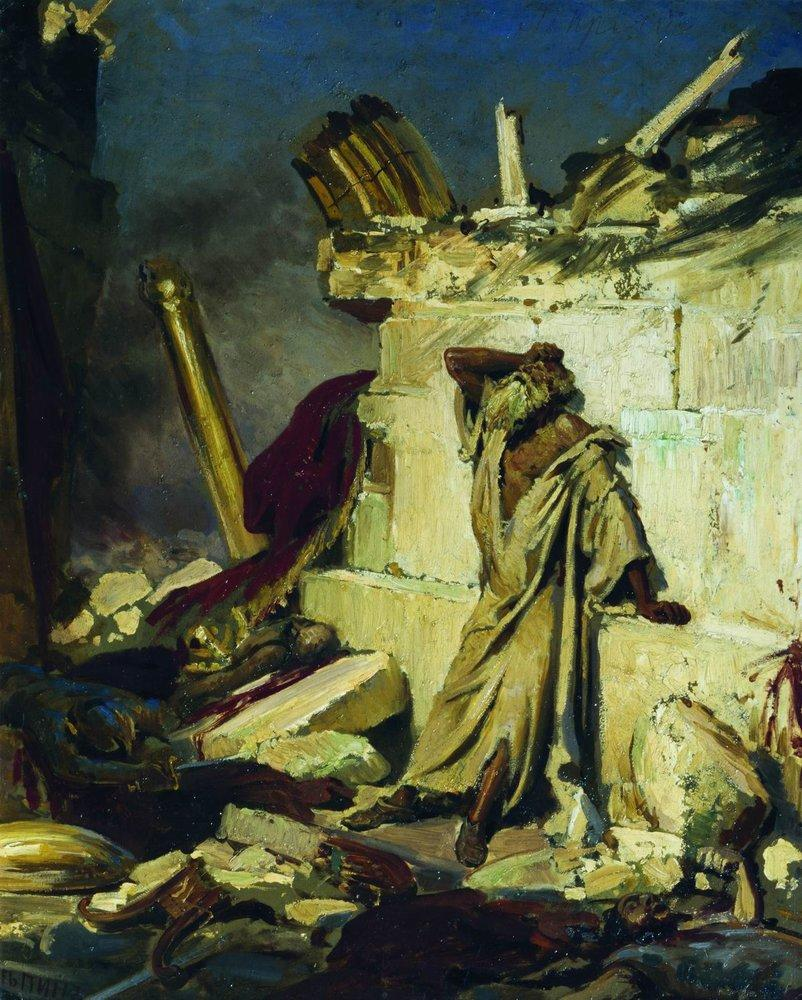
Cry of the Prophet Jeremiah on the Ruins of Jerusalem, painting by Ilya Repin, Tretyakov Gallery, Moscow

Centuries later, this theological model helped shape Jewish responses to the destruction of Jerusalem by the Romans in 70 AD. The Jewish historian Josephus, writing in the aftermath of the First Jewish–Roman War, draws on the memory of the Babylonian conquest. In a speech he claims to have delivered before the city's walls during the siege, he depicts the Romans as divinely appointed rulers, likening them to the Babylonians of earlier times. He presents himself as a new Jeremiah, urging surrender and framing the Roman victory as part of God's will.

== Bibliography ==
- Čapek, Filip; Lipschits, Oded (2019). The Last Century in the History of Judah: The Seventh Century BCE in Archaeological, Historical, and Biblical Perspectives. Ancient Israel and its Literature. SBL Press. ISBN 9781628372526.
- Goldenberg, Robert (2006). "The destruction of the Jerusalem Temple: its meaning and its consequences". In Katz, Steven T. (ed.). The Late Roman-Rabbinic Period. The Cambridge History of Judaism. Vol. 4. Cambridge University Press. pp. 194–195. doi:10.1017/chol9780521772488.009. ISBN 978-0-521-77248-8.
- Grabbe, Lester L. (2006). A History of the Jews and Judaism in the Second Temple Period: The Persian Period (539–331 BCE). The Library of Second Temple Studies. Vol. 1. T&T Clark. ISBN 9780567216175.
- Kreimerman, Igor (2022). "From Urban Centers into Mounds of Ruins: The Destruction of Cities during the Iron Age". In Keimer, Kyle H.; Pierce, George A. (eds.). The Ancient Israelite World. Taylor & Francis. p. 182. doi:10.4324/9780367815691-13/urban-centers-mounds-ruins-igor-kreimerman. Archived from the original on 2024-05-06.
