= Riblah =

Ancient town, now in Syria

Coordinates: 34°26′0″N 36°33′0″E

The ancient town of Riblah, today a tell covered by a cemetery not far from the town of Ribleh on the Syrian side of the border with Lebanon, was in biblical times located on the northern frontier of the land of Canaan. The site lies on the eastern bank of the Orontes River, in a wide and fertile plain, 35 miles north-east of Baalbek and 10 or 12 miles south of the artificial Lake Homs created by the Romans. Brenton translated the place as Rablaam in his translation of the Septuagint.

It was at Riblah that Necho II, pharaoh of Egypt (c. 610 – c. 595 BCE), established his camp after he had routed Josiah's Judahite army at Megiddo in 609 BCE. Soon after this, the son of Josiah, the newly anointed King Jehoahaz, was made prisoner and held at Riblah to prevent him from ruling Judah; he was later taken to Egypt where he died (2 Kings 23:29–34). A reference in Ezekiel 19:4:

The nations combined against him [Jehoahaz]; he was caught in their pit;
They dragged him off with hooks to the land of Egypt

is interpreted as stating that Necho had invited Jehoahaz to a conference in Riblah and trapped him there.

Some two decades later, Nebuchadnezzar of Babylon also set up his headquarters here during his campaign against Judah, which culminated in the destruction of Jerusalem in 587 or 586 BCE. King Zedekiah was taken captive and brought to Riblah, described as a dependency of Hamath, where he had to witness how his sons were killed, after which he was blinded and taken to Babylon. His officials were also put to death in Riblah (2 Kings 25:6–7, 18–21. Jeremiah 39:5–7; 52:9–11, 26–27).

The town was situated on the main international trade route from Egypt to Mesopotamia, via Israel and the town of Carchemish where the road crossed over the Euphrates River. An important strategic asset, Riblah had plenty of water, food and fuel, which made also suitable as a military camp.

In Roman times, the town also bore the name Daphne.

== Riblah in Canaan ==
There was also a town with the same name on the eastern boundary of the land promised to Moses in Canaan, known from Numbers 34:2, 10, 11, but whose location is still uncertain. The town is described in Numbers 34:11 as "on the eastern side of Ain". Two springs still called el-Ain el-Fauqah and el-Ain el-Tahta ("the upper" and "the lower fountain") can still be found about 10 miles east of the Sea of Galilee, close to the town of Samar in Irbid Governorate, Jordan.
