= Babylonian captivity =

Period in Jewish history during the 6th century BCE

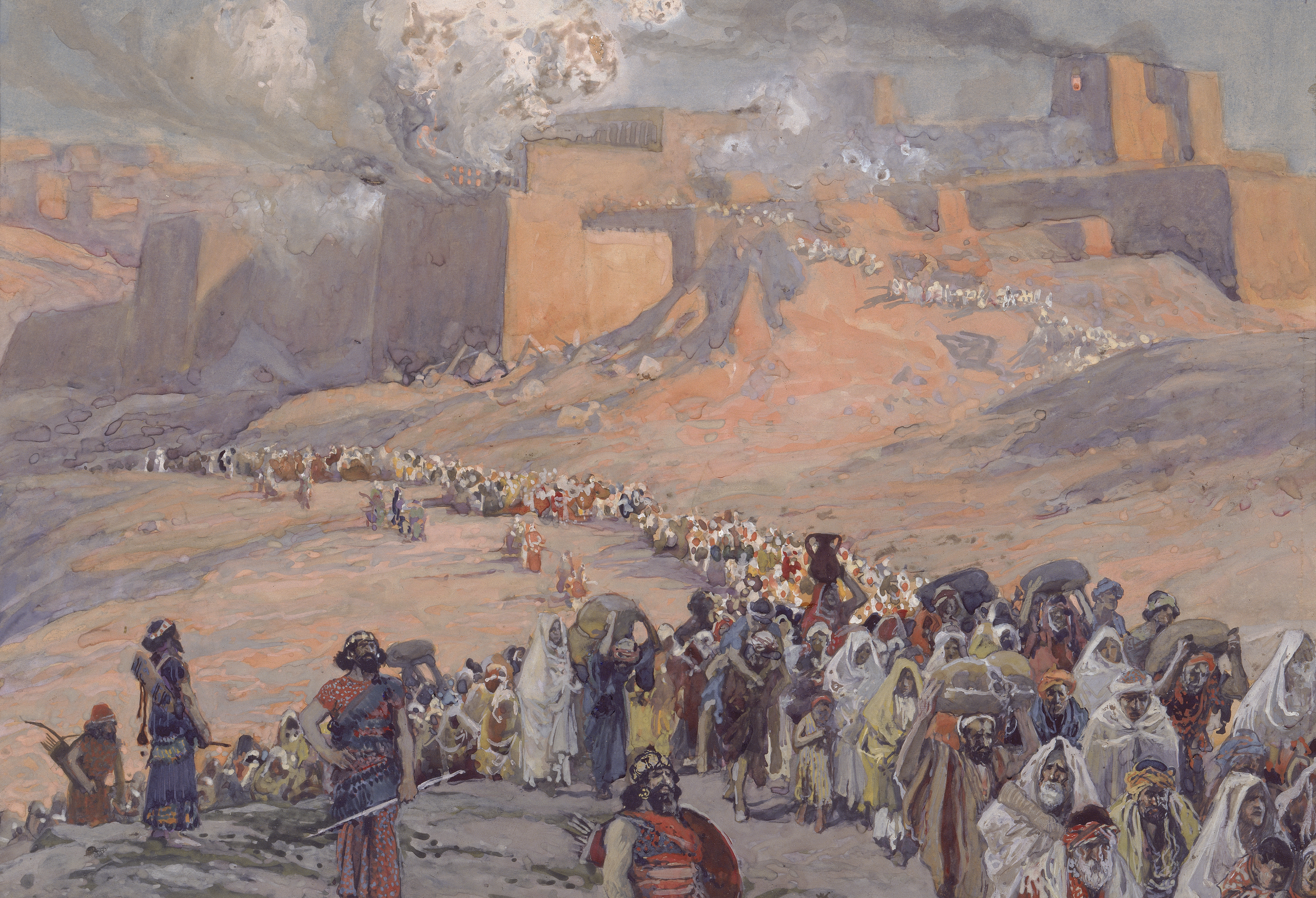
The Flight of the Prisoners (1896) by James Tissot; the exile of the Jews from Judea to Babylon

The Babylonian captivity or Babylonian exile was the period in Jewish history during which a large number of Judeans from the ancient Kingdom of Judah were exiled to Babylonia by the Neo-Babylonian Empire. The expulsions occurred in multiple waves: After the siege of Jerusalem in 597 BCE, around 7,000 people were exiled to Mesopotamia. Further expulsions followed the destruction of Jerusalem and Solomon's Temple in 587 BCE.

Although the dates, numbers of expulsions, and numbers of exiles vary in the several Hebrew Bible accounts, the following is a general outline of what occurred. After the Battle of Carchemish in 605 BCE, the Babylonian king Nebuchadnezzar II besieged Jerusalem, which resulted in tribute being paid by the Judean king Jehoiakim. In c. 601 BCE, Jehoiakim refused to pay further tribute, which led in 598/597 BCE to another siege of the city by Nebuchadnezzar II and culminated in the death of Jehoiakim and the exile to Babylonia of his successor Jeconiah, Jeconiah's court, and many others. In 587 BCE, Nebuchadnezzar II destroyed Jerusalem and exiled Jeconiah's successor Zedekiah and others. In 582 BCE, Nebuchadnezzar II exiled another group.

The Hebrew Bible (Tanakh) recounts how, after the fall of the Neo-Babylonian Empire to the Achaemenid Empire at the Battle of Opis in 539 BCE, exiled Judeans were permitted by the Persians to return to Judah. According to the Tanakh‘s Book of Ezra, construction of the Israelites’ Second Temple began c. 537 BCE in Jerusalem, with Judea as part of the new Persian province named Yehud Medinata ("the province of Judah") under Cyrus the Great. All of these events are considered significant to the developed history and culture of the Jewish people, and ultimately had a far-reaching impact on the further development of Judaism.

Archaeological studies have revealed that, although the city of Jerusalem was utterly destroyed, Judah continued to be inhabited by a remnant of Judeans during the period of the Judean exile in Babylon. Historical records from Mesopotamia and Jewish sources indicate that, after liberation by Cyrus, a portion of the Jewish population continued to live in Mesopotamia. This sub-group led to the establishment of a sizable Jewish community in Mesopotamia, known in Hebrew as The Golah (exiles), which persisted until modern times. The Iraqi Jewish, Persian Jewish, Georgian Jewish, Bukharian Jewish, and Mountain Jewish communities are believed to derive their ancestry in large part from these exiles; these communities have now largely emigrated to Israel.

== Hebrew Bible accounts of the exile ==
In the late 7th century BCE, the Kingdom of Judah was a client state of the Assyrian empire. In the last decades of the century, Assyria was overthrown by Babylon, an Assyrian province. Egypt, fearing the sudden rise of the Neo-Babylonian empire, seized control of Assyrian territory up to the Euphrates river in Syria, but Babylon counter-attacked. In the process Josiah, the king of Judah, was killed in a battle with the Egyptians at the Battle of Megiddo (609 BCE).

After the defeat of Pharaoh Necho's army by the Babylonians at Carchemish in 605 BCE, Jehoiakim began paying tribute to Nebuchadnezzar II of Babylon. Some of the young nobility of Judah were taken to Babylon.

In the following years, the court of Jerusalem was divided into two parties, one supporting Egypt, the other Babylon. After Nebuchadnezzar was defeated in battle in 601 BCE by Egypt, Judah revolted against Babylon, culminating in a three-month siege of Jerusalem beginning in late 598 BCE. Jehoiakim, the king of Judah, died during the siege and was succeeded by his son Jehoiachin (also called Jeconiah) at the age of eighteen. The city fell on 2 Adar (March 16) 597 BCE, and Nebuchadnezzar pillaged Jerusalem and its Temple and took Jeconiah, his court and other prominent citizens (including the prophet Ezekiel) back to Babylon. Jehoiakim's uncle Zedekiah was appointed king in his place, but the exiles in Babylon continued to consider Jeconiah as their Exilarch, or rightful ruler.

Despite warnings by Jeremiah and others of the pro-Babylonian party, Zedekiah revolted against Babylon and entered into an alliance with Pharaoh Hophra. Nebuchadnezzar returned, defeated the Egyptians, and again besieged Jerusalem, resulting in the city's destruction in 587 BCE. Nebuchadnezzar destroyed the city wall and the Temple, together with the houses of the most important citizens. Zedekiah and his sons were captured and the sons were executed in front of Zedekiah, who was then blinded and taken to Babylon with many others (Jer 52:10–11). Judah became a Babylonian province, called Yehud, putting an end to the independent Kingdom of Judah. Because of the missing years in the Jewish calendar, rabbinic sources place the date of the destruction of the First Temple at 3338 AM (423 BCE) or 3358 AM (403 BCE).

The first governor appointed by Babylon was Gedaliah, a native Judahite; he encouraged the many Jews who had fled to surrounding countries such as Moab, Ammon and Edom to return, and he took steps to return the country to prosperity. Some time later, a surviving member of the royal family assassinated Gedaliah and his Babylonian advisors, prompting many refugees to seek safety in Egypt. By the end of the second decade of the 6th century BCE, in addition to those who remained in Judah, there were significant Jewish communities in Babylon and in Egypt; this was the beginning of the later numerous Jewish communities living permanently outside Judah in the Jewish Diaspora.

According to the book of Ezra, the Persian Cyrus the Great ended the exile in 538 BCE, the year after he captured Babylon. The exile ended with the return under Zerubbabel the Prince (so-called because he was a descendant of the royal line of David) and Joshua the Priest (a descendant of the line of the former High Priests of the Temple) and their construction of the Second Temple in the period from 521 to 516 BCE.

== Archaeological and other extra-biblical evidence ==
=== First campaign (597 BCE) ===
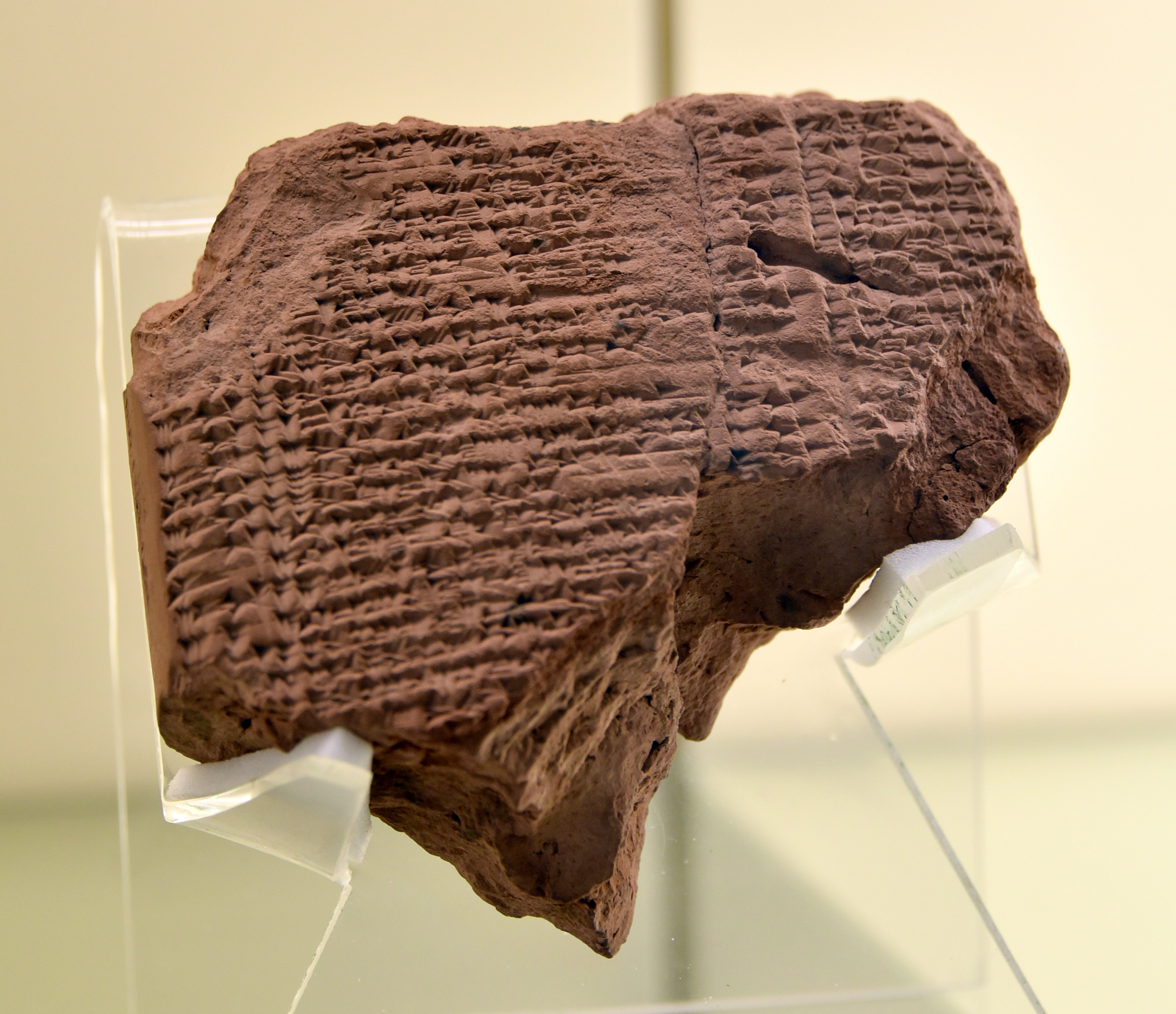
Clay tablet. The Akkadian cuneiform inscription lists certain rations and mentions the name of Jeconiah (Jehoiachin), King of Judah, and the Babylonian captivity. From Babylon, Iraq. Reign of Nebuchadnezzar II, c. 580 BCE. Vorderasiatisches Museum, Berlin

Nebuchadnezzar's siege of Jerusalem, his capture of its king, his appointment of another in his place, and the plundering of the city in 597 BCE are corroborated by a passage in the Babylonian Chronicles:

In the seventh year, in the month of Kislev, the king of Akkad mustered his troops, marched to the Hatti-land, and encamped against the City of Judah and on the ninth day of the month of Adar he seized the city and captured the king. He appointed there a king of his own choice and taking heavy tribute brought it back to Babylon.

Jehoiachin's Rations Tablets, describing ration orders for a captive King of Judah, identified with King Jeconiah, have been discovered during excavations in Babylon, in the royal archives of Nebuchadnezzar. One of the tablets refers to food rations for "Ya’u-kīnu, king of the land of Yahudu" and five royal princes, his sons.

=== Second campaign (589–587 BCE) ===
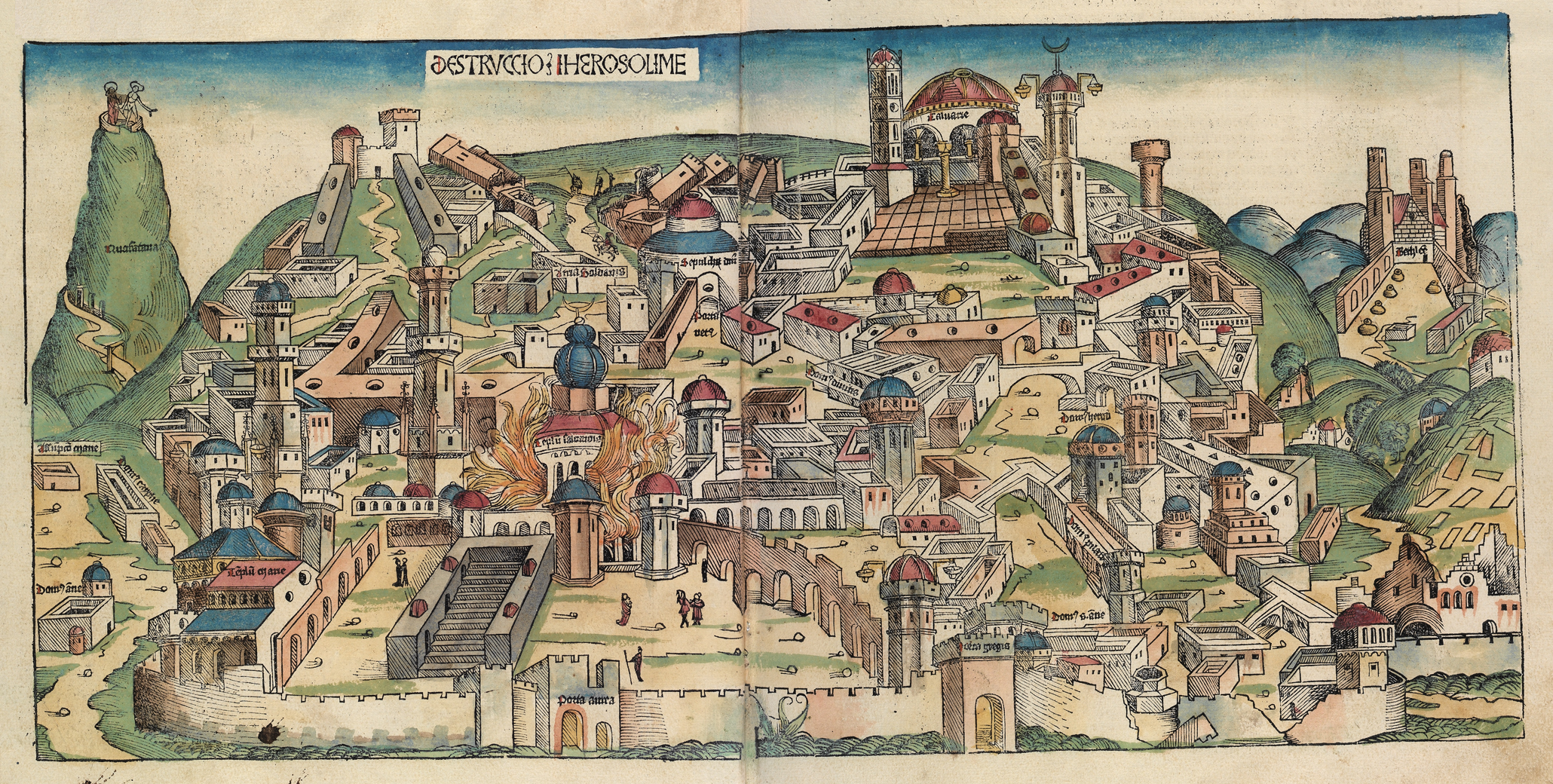
Illustration from the Nuremberg Chronicle of the destruction of Jerusalem under the Babylonian rule

Nebuchadnezzar and the Babylonian forces returned in 589 BCE and rampaged through Judah, leaving clear archaeological evidence of destruction in many towns and settlements there. Clay ostraca from this period, referred to as the Lachish letters, were discovered during excavations; one, which was probably written to the commander at Lachish from an outlying base, describes how the signal fires from nearby towns were disappearing: "And may (my lord) be apprised that we are watching for the fire signals of Lachish according to all the signs which my lord has given, because we cannot see Azeqah." Archaeological finds from Jerusalem testify that virtually the whole city within the walls was burnt to rubble in 587 BCE and utterly destroyed.

=== Aftermath in Judah ===
Excavations indicate a sharp decline in population in post-conquest Judah. Estimates of Judah's population before and after the Babylonian campaigns vary among scholars, but generally point to a drop from roughly 110,000 to somewhere between 15,000 and 40,000 inhabitants. This collapse cannot be attributed to deportations alone, but also to wartime deaths due to various reasons and voluntary flight abroad. Archaeologist Avraham Faust suggests that between the deportations and executions of Judeans by the invading Babylonians, plus the famines and epidemics that occurred during the war, the Israelite population of Judah may have been reduced to as little as 10% of what it had been in the time before their exile to Babylon.

Although Jerusalem was destroyed, with large parts of the city remaining in ruins for 150 years, other Israelite settlements in Judah continued to be inhabited, without signs of disruption visible in archaeological studies.

=== Conditions in exile ===
In Mesopotamia, the exiled Judeans were relocated to agricultural settlements, with one notable settlement being Tel-Abib near the city of Nippur. Biblical scholar Niels Peter Lemche suggests that the exiled Judeans experienced a lifestyle scarcely less prosperous than what they were accustomed to in their homeland.

However, there is evidence for hardship. For example, exiled Jewish leaders were suspected of national disloyalty and were reduced to peasantry, where they worked in agriculture and building projects and performed simple tasks such as farming, shepherding and fishing. This ended when the Persians conquered Babylon. Exiled Jewish commoners were nostalgic about Judah and, due to circumstance, were forced to abandon temple-based worship. They mostly worshipped in private homes and kept some religious traditions such as circumcision, Sabbath observance, reading of the Psalms and Law.

=== Persian restoration ===
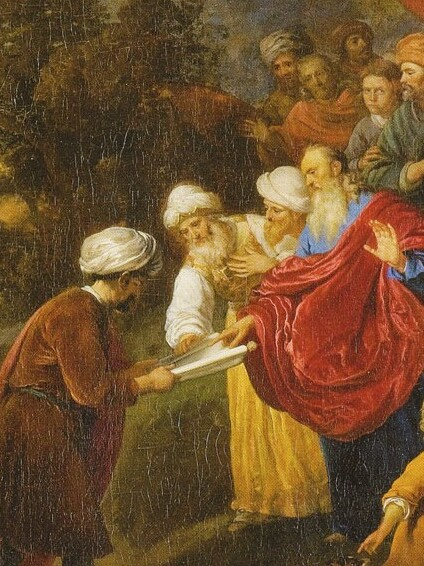
Zerubbabel and Cyrus (1650s) by Jacob van Loo; the Jewish governor Zerubbabel shows the Persian king Cyrus the Great the plan for a rebuilt Jerusalem

The Cyrus Cylinder, an ancient tablet on which is written a declaration in the name of Cyrus referring to restoration of temples and repatriation of exiled peoples, has often been taken as corroboration of the authenticity of the biblical decrees attributed to Cyrus, but other scholars point out that the cylinder's text is specific to Babylon and Mesopotamia and makes no mention of Judah or Jerusalem. Professor Lester L. Grabbe asserted that the "alleged decree of Cyrus" regarding Judah, "cannot be considered authentic", but that there was a "general policy of allowing deportees to return and to re-establish cult sites". He also stated that archaeology suggests that the return was a "trickle" taking place over decades, rather than a single event.

As part of the Persian Empire, the former Kingdom of Judah became the province of Judah (Yehud Medinata) with different borders, covering a smaller territory. The population of the province was greatly reduced from that of the kingdom; archaeological surveys suggesting a population of around 30,000 people in the 5th to 4th centuries BCE.

A 2017 exhibition in Jerusalem displayed over 100 cuneiform tablets detailing trade in fruits and other commodities, taxes, debts, and credits accumulated between Jews forced or persuaded to move from Jerusalem by King Nebuchadnezzar around 600 BCE. The tablets included details on one exiled Judean family over four generations, all with Hebrew names.

Most Jews who returned were poor and either saw the exile as "spiritual regeneration" or "divine punishment for sins". One reason why wealthy Jews stayed in Mesopotamia includes economic opportunities, which were relatively uncommon in Judah.

== Exilic literature ==
The exilic period was a rich source for Hebrew literature. Biblical depictions of the exile include Book of Jeremiah 39–43 (which saw the exile as a lost opportunity); the final section of 2 Kings (which portrays it as the temporary end of history); 2 Chronicles (in which the exile is the "Sabbath of the land"); and the opening chapters of Ezra, which records its end. Other works from or about the exile include the stories in Daniel 1–6, Susanna, Bel and the Dragon, the "Story of the Three Youths" (1 Esdras 3:1–5:6), and the books of Tobit and Judith. The Book of Lamentations arose from the Babylonian captivity. The final redaction of the Pentateuch took place in the Persian period following the exile,and the Priestly source, one of its main sources, is primarily a product of the post-exilic period when the former Kingdom of Judah had become the Persian province of Yehud.

== Significance for Jewish culture ==
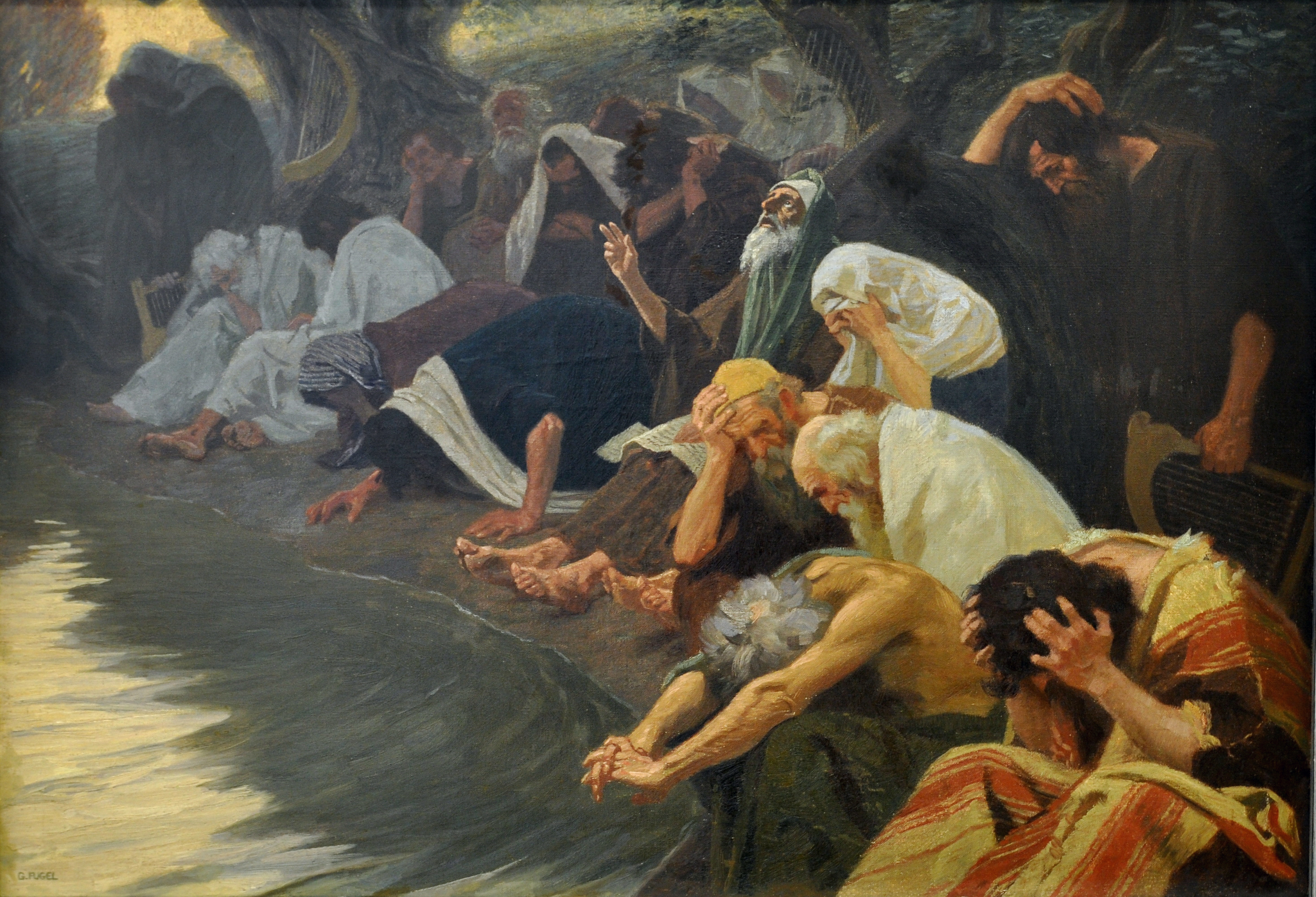
Waters of Babylon (1920) by Gebhard Fugel; Jews sit on the banks of the Tigris, which flows through Babylon, and remembering Jerusalem. Psalm 137 tells us about this event: "By the rivers of Babylon, there we sat down, yea, we wept, when we remembered Zion.^{137:1} If I forget thee, O Jerusalem, let my right hand forget her cunning."^{137:5}

In the Hebrew Bible, the captivity in Babylon is presented as a punishment for idolatry and disobedience to Yahweh. The Babylonian captivity greatly affected Judaism and Jewish culture. The Imperial Aramaic alphabet, which evolved into the Hebrew alphabet, was adopted during this period. Eventually the Aramaic-based Hebrew alphabet replaced the Paleo-Hebrew alphabet.

This period saw the last high point of Hebrew Bible prophecy in the person of Ezekiel, followed by the emergence of the central role of the Torah in Jewish life. According to many historical-critical scholars, the Torah was redacted during this time, and began to be regarded as the authoritative text for Jews. The ethno-religious group celebrates this period as exemplifying their tenacity for survival, despite the destruction of their ancestral country’s central Temple. Israeli philosopher and Biblical scholar Yehezkel Kaufmann said "The exile is the watershed. With the exile, the religion of Israel comes to an end and Judaism begins."

During this time, the captives moved from a monolatrous to a monotheistic faith system.

This process coincided with the emergence of scribes and sages as Jewish leaders (see Ezra). Prior to exile, the Israelites had been organized by tribe. After, they were organized by smaller family groups. Only the Tribe of Levi continued in its temple role after the return. After this time, there were always sizable numbers of Jews living outside the Land of Israel; thus, it also marks the beginning of the "Jewish diaspora", unless this is considered to have begun with the Assyrian captivity.

In rabbinic literature, biblical nations were used as metaphors for the Jewish diaspora, particularly Babylon, based on the historical captivity of the 6th century BCE. Following the Roman destruction of Israel’s Second Temple in 70 CE, the names Rome and Edom temporarily became such standard terms.

== Chronology ==
The following table is based on Rainer Albertz's work on Israel in exile, itself based mainly on Hebrew Bible texts. (Alternative dates are possible.)

Year	Event
609 BCE	Death of Josiah. Jehoahaz reigns three months. Jehoahaz is deposed and taken captive to Egypt by the Egyptian Pharaoh Necho II. Jehoiakim is made king of Judah by Necho and reigns 11 years.
605 BCE	Babylonians defeat the Egyptians and besiege Jerusalem. Jehoiakim surrenders and begins giving tribute to Nebuchadnezzar II of Babylon in 605 BCE. First deportation, purportedly including Daniel, Hananiah, Mishael, and Azariah.
601 BCE	Babylonians fail to invade Egypt. Jehoiakim switches his allegiance back to the Egyptians.
598/7 BCE	Nebuchadnezzar invades Judea and again lays siege to Jerusalem. End of Jehoiakim's reign. Jehoiachin reigns three months.
597 BCE	First fall of Jerusalem. Second deportation, 16 March 597 including Jehoiachin and Ezekiel. Zedekiah is made king of Judah by Nebuchadnezzar and reigns 11 years.
594 BCE	Anti-Babylonian conspiracy. Zedekiah arranges a meeting of the kings of Ammon, Edom, Moab, Sidon and Tyre in Jerusalem to deal with the possibility of throwing off Babylonian control.
587 BCE	Second fall of Jerusalem. Solomon's Temple destroyed. Third deportation July/August 587. Zedekiah is taken captive to Babylon and his sons are killed.
583 BCE	Gedaliah, the Babylonian-appointed governor of Yehud Province, is assassinated. Many Jews flee to Egypt and a possible fourth deportation to Babylon.
562 BCE	Release of Jehoiachin after 37 years in a Babylonian prison following the ascension of Amel-Marduk. Jehoiachin remains in Babylon.
539 BCE	Persians conquer Babylon (October).
538 BCE	Decree of Cyrus allows Jews to return to Jerusalem. Sheshbazzar leads a wave of Jews back to Yehud.
520–515 BCE	Return by many Jews to Yehud under Zerubbabel and Joshua the High Priest. Foundations of Second Temple laid.
457 BCE	Third return migration under Ezra who reintroduces the Torah in Jerusalem.
444 BCE	Fourth return migration under Nehemiah who rebuilds Jerusalem and its walls.

== See also ==
- Assyrian captivity
- Avignon Papacy, sometimes called the "Babylonian Captivity of the Papacy"
- Al-Yahudu Tablets, 200 cuneiform tablets from the sixth and fifth centuries BCE on the exiled Judean community near Nippur
- Biblical Egypt
- Return to Zion, biblical account of the return to Judah by some of the exiled Judahites
- Psalm 137, expressing lamentation of the exiles in Babylon for the loss of Jerusalem
