= Siege of Jerusalem (597 BC) =

Victory by Nebuchadnezzar II of Babylon

- Part of Judah's revolts against Babylon (601–586 BC)
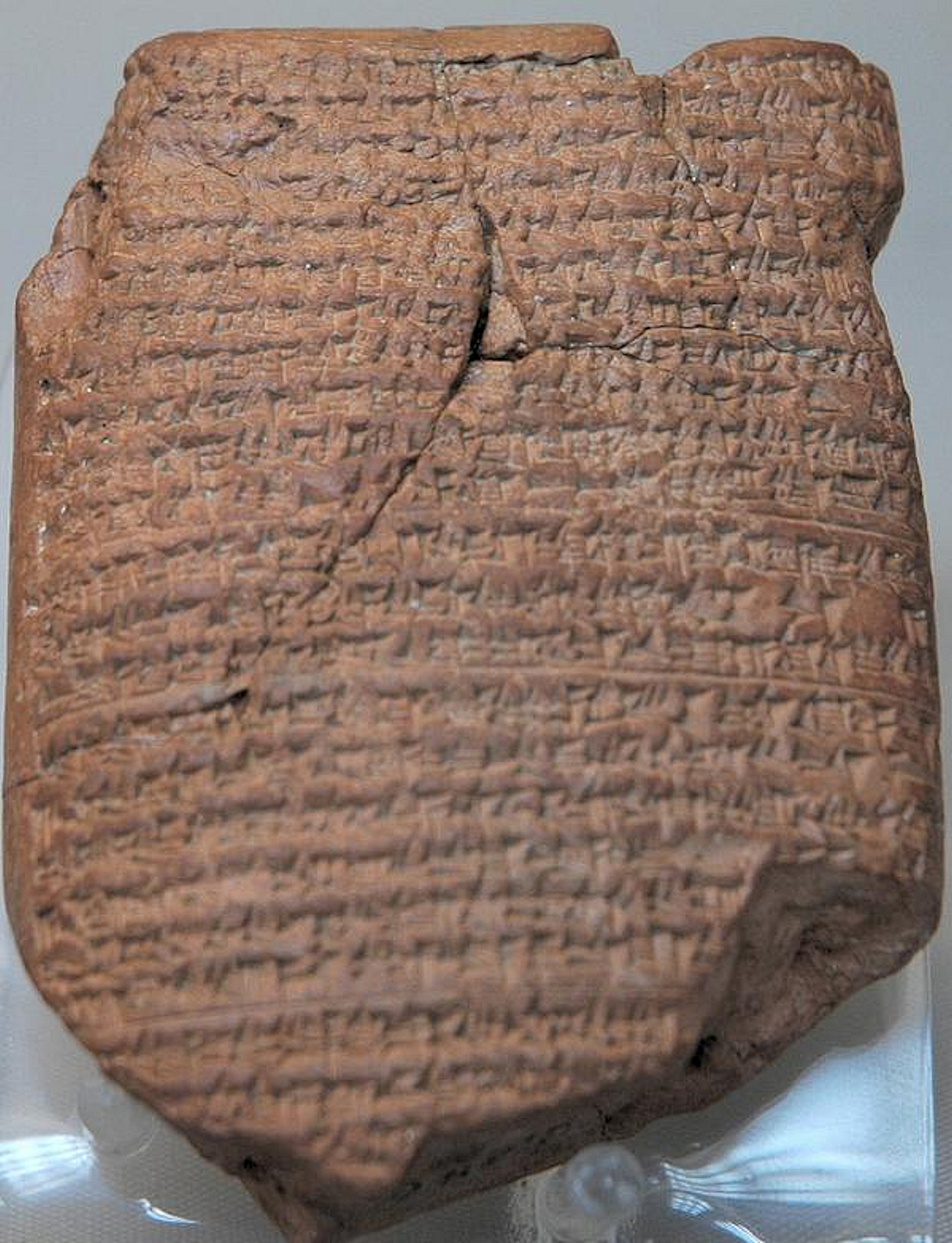
- The siege of Jerusalem is mentioned in the Early Years of Nebuchadnezzar chronicle (ABC 05)
Date	c. 597 BC
Location	Jerusalem 31°46′39″N 35°13′48″E
Result	Babylonian victory

Belligerents
Kingdom of Judah	Neo-Babylonian Empire

Commanders and leaders
Jehoiakim (PKIA); Jeconiah (POW)	Nebuchadnezzar II

Strength
Much fewer	Unknown

Casualties and losses
Many slain, others taken to captivity	Unknown
- Location within Jerusalem District Siege of Jerusalem (597 BC) (Israel)

The siege of Jerusalem (597 BC) was a military campaign carried out by Nebuchadnezzar II, king of the Neo-Babylonian Empire, in which he besieged Jerusalem, then capital of the Kingdom of Judah. The city surrendered, and its king Jeconiah was deported to Babylon and replaced by his Babylonian-appointed uncle, Zedekiah. The siege is recorded in both the Hebrew Bible (2 Kings 24:10–16) and the Babylonian Nebuchadnezzar Chronicle.

In 601 BC, Nebuchadnezzar II unsuccessfully attempted to take Egypt and was repulsed with heavy losses. Jehoiakim—the king of Judah—seized this opportunity to revolt against Babylonian rule, taking a pro-Egyptian position, despite the strong remonstrances of the prophet Jeremiah. The circumstances of Jehoiakim's death are not clear. He was succeeded by his young son, Jeconiah.

The Babylonians besieged Jerusalem, and in March 597 BC the city surrendered. Jeconiah, his court and other prominent citizens and craftsmen, were deported to Babylon. This event is considered to be the start of the Babylonian captivity and of the Jewish diaspora. Jeconiah's uncle, Zedekiah, was installed as vassal king of Judah.

A decade later, Zedekiah launched another rebellion against the Babylonians, which was brutally crushed by Nebuchadnezzar II. In 587 BC, a second siege of Jerusalem culminated in the destruction of the city and Solomon's Temple, bringing an end to the Kingdom of Judah.

== Dating ==
The Babylonian Chronicles, which were published by Donald Wiseman in 1956, establish that Nebuchadnezzar captured Jerusalem the first time on March 16, 597 BC. Before Wiseman's publication, E. R. Thiele had determined from the biblical texts that Nebuchadnezzar's initial capture of Jerusalem occurred in the spring of 597 BC, but other scholars, including William F. Albright, more frequently dated the event to 598 BC.

== Siege ==
To avoid the destruction of Jerusalem, King Jehoiakim of Judah, in his third year, changed his allegiance from Egypt to Babylon. He paid tribute from the treasury in Jerusalem, and Nebuchadnezzar took some temple artifacts and some of the royal family and nobility as hostages. In 601 BC, during the fourth year of his reign, Nebuchadnezzar unsuccessfully attempted to invade Egypt and was repulsed with heavy losses. The failure led to numerous rebellions among the states of the Levant which owed allegiance to Babylon, including Judah, where King Jehoiakim stopped paying tribute to Nebuchadnezzar and took a pro-Egyptian position.

Nebuchadnezzar soon dealt with these rebellions. According to the Nebuchadnezzar Chronicle, he laid siege to Jerusalem, which eventually fell in 597 BC. The Chronicle states:

In the seventh year [of Nebuchadnezzar, 598 BC] in the month Chislev [November/December] the king of Babylon assembled his army, and after he had invaded the land of Hatti (Syria/Palestine) he laid siege to the city of Judah. On the second day of the month of Adar [16 March] he conquered the city and took the king [Jeconiah] prisoner. He installed in his place a king [Zedekiah] of his own choice, and after he had received rich tribute, he sent forth to Babylon.

Jehoiakim is thought to have died during the siege, possibly on December 10, 598 BC, or during the months of Kislev, or Tevet. Nebuchadnezzar pillaged the city and its Temple, and the new king Jeconiah, who was either 8 or 18, and his court and other prominent citizens and craftsmen, were deported to Babylon. The deportation occurred prior to Nisan of 597 BC, and dates in the Book of Ezekiel are counted from that event.

Nebuchadnezzar installed Jeconiah's uncle, Zedekiah as puppet-king of Judah, and Jeconiah was compelled to remain in Babylon. The start of Zedekiah's reign has been variously dated within a few weeks before, or after the start of Nisan 597 BC.

The Book of Kings (written in the 7th and 6th centuries BC) records that 10,000 people were exiled during this time, also adding 7,000 craftsmen and 1,000 "smiths", bringing the total to 18,000. Comparatively, the Book of Jeremiah mentions 3,023 people taken into captivity. Some scholars have argued whether this number includes only men. If this is true, perhaps as many as 15,000 to 30,000 Judeans were exiled.
