= Zedekiah =

Biblical figure; last monarch of the Kingdom of Judah

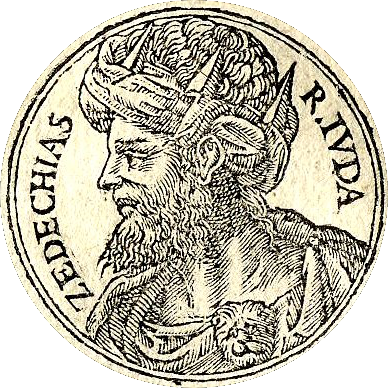
- Zedekiah from Guillaume Rouillé's Promptuarium Iconum Insigniorum, 1553

King of Judah
- Reign: 597–586 BC
- Predecessor: Jehoiachin
- Successor: Monarchy abolished
- Born: Mattaniah c. 618 BC; Jerusalem, Kingdom of Judah
- Died: After 586 BC; Babylon, Neo-Babylonian Empire
- House: House of David
- Father: Josiah
- Mother: Hamutal

Zedekiah (Note: Hebrew: צִדְקִיָּהוּ, Modern: Tzidkiyáhu, Tiberian: Ṣīḏqīyyāhū, "My righteousness is Yahweh/God"; Koine Greek: Σεδεκίας, romanized: Sedekías; Latin: Sedecias.) (/ˌzɛdɪˈkaɪə/ ZED-ih-KY-ə; born Mattaniah; (Note: Hebrew: מַתַּנְיָהוּ, romanized: Matanyáhu/Mattanyāhū, "Gift of God"; Greek: Μαθθανίας; Latin: Matthanias.), Hebrew: צִדְקִיָּהוּ, romanized: Ṣiḏqîyāhū, "Yah is righteousness", c. 618 BC – after 586 BC) was the twentieth and final King of Judah before the destruction of Jerusalem by Nebuchadnezzar II of Babylon.

After the siege of Jerusalem in 597 BC, Nebuchadnezzar deposed King Jeconiah and installed Jeconiah's uncle Mattaniah instead, changing his name to Zedekiah (2 Kings 24:17). The prophet Jeremiah was his counselor, yet did not heed the prophet and his epitaph is "he did evil in the sight of the Lord" (2 Kings 24:19–20; Jeremiah 52:2–3).

Biblical scholar William F. Albright dates the start of Zedekiah's reign to 598 BC, while Edwin R. Thiele gives the start as 597 BC. Thus, Zedekiah was born in either c. 617 or 618 BC, being 21-years-old on becoming king. Zedekiah's reign ended after he allied with the Egyptians and, against the advice of Jeremiah, launched a revolt against Nebuchadnezzar, resulting in the second siege and fall of Jerusalem (c. 587 or 586 BC).

== Background ==
The defeat of the Neo-Assyrian Empire in 612 BC at the Battle of Nineveh by the Neo-Babylonian Empire caused upheavals that led to the destruction of the Kingdom of Judah. Egypt, concerned about the new threat posed by the Babylonians, moved northward to support Assyria. It set on the march in 608 BC, moving through Judah. King Josiah attempted to block the Egyptian forces and fell mortally wounded in battle at Megiddo. Josiah's younger son Jehoahaz was chosen to succeed his father on the throne. Three months later the Egyptian pharaoh Necho II, returning from the north, deposed Jehoahaz in favor of his older brother, Jehoiakim. Jehoahaz was taken back to Egypt as a captive.

After the Babylonians defeated the Egyptians at the Battle of Carchemish in 605 BC, Nebuchadnezzar II besieged Jerusalem. Jehoiakim changed allegiances to avoid the destruction of Jerusalem. He paid tribute from the treasury, some artifacts from the temple, and some of the royal family and nobility were taken as hostages. The subsequent failure of the Babylonian invasion into Egypt undermined Babylonian control of the area, and after three years, Jehoiakim switched allegiance back to the Egyptians and ceased paying the tribute to Babylon. Because of this, Nebuchadnezzar II invaded Judah again in 599 BC, and again laid siege to Jerusalem. In 598 BC, Jehoiakim died during the siege and was succeeded by his son Jeconiah (also known as Jehoiachin). Jerusalem fell within three months. Jeconiah was deposed by Nebuchadnezzar, who installed Zedekiah, Jeconiah's uncle, in his place.

== Life and reign ==
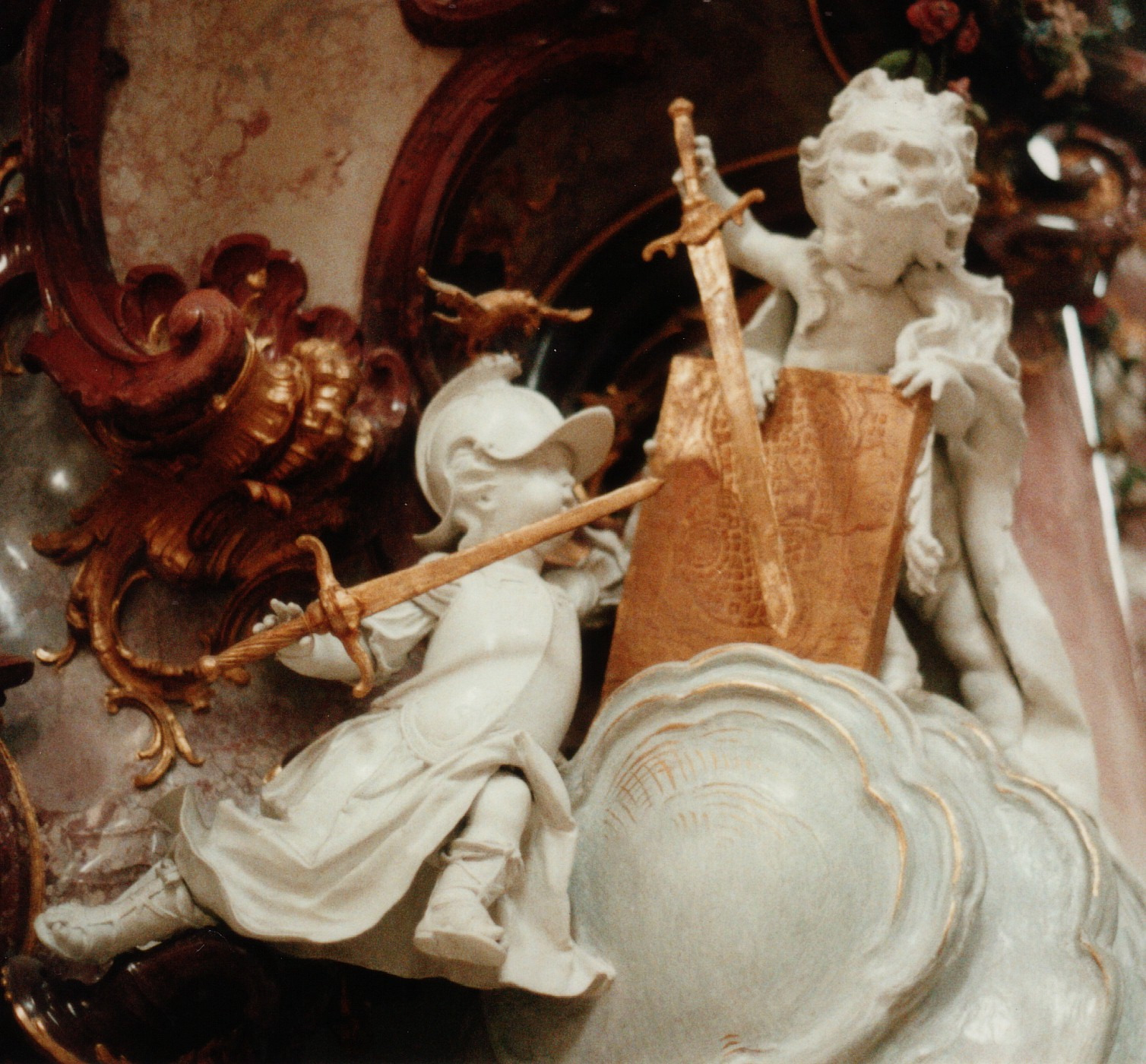
Nebuchadnezzar confronts Zedekiah, who holds a plan of Jerusalem, in this Baroque-era depiction in Zwiefalten Abbey in Germany.

According to the Hebrew Bible, Zedekiah was twenty-one years old when he was made king of Judah by Nebuchadnezzar II in 597 BC. This is in agreement with a Babylonian chronicle, which states,

The seventh year: In the month Kislev the king of Akkad mustered his army and marched to Hattu. He encamped against the city of Judah and on the second day of the month Adar he captured the city [and] seized [its] king. A king of his own choice he appointed in the city [and] taking the vast tribute he brought it into Babylon.

The kingdom was at that time a tributary to Nebuchadnezzar II. Despite the strong remonstrances of Jeremiah, Baruch ben Neriah and other family and advisors—and ignoring the example of his older brother Jehoiakim—Zedekiah entered into an alliance with Pharaoh Hophra of Egypt and revolted against Babylon. Nebuchadnezzar responded by invading Judah (2 Kings 25:1). Nebuchadnezzar began a siege of Jerusalem in December 589 BC. During this siege "every worst woe befell the city, which drank the cup of God's fury to the dregs" (2 Kings 25:3; Lamentations 4:4, 5).

After laying siege to the city for about thirty months, Nebuchadnezzar finally succeeded in capturing Jerusalem in 586 BC. Zedekiah and his followers attempted to escape, making their way out of the city, but were captured on the plains of Jericho and taken to Riblah. There, Zedekiah saw his sons put to death. Then his eyes were put out and he was loaded with chains and carried captive to Babylon (2 Kings 25:1–7; Jeremiah 32:4–5; 34:2–3; 39:1–7; 52:4–11; Ezekiel 12:13), where he remained a prisoner until he died.

After the fall of Jerusalem, Nebuchadnezzar sent Nebuzaradan to destroy the city. It was plundered and razed to the ground, and Solomon's Temple was destroyed. Only a small number of vinedressers and husbandmen were permitted to remain in the land (Jeremiah 52:16).The sages also explain Proverbs 24:30 as follows: I passed by the field of a lazy man, This is Ahaz. And the vineyard of a senseless man, this is Manashe. And behold, it was all overgrown with thorns, this is Amon. And its surface was covered with Nettle, this is Jehoiakim. And its stone wall was broken down, this is a reference to Zedekiah, in whose days the temple was destroyed.

== In the Book of Jeremiah ==
Zedekiah's first appearance in the Book of Jeremiah is in Jeremiah 21, where he sends Pashhur, the son of Malchiah, and the priest Zephaniah, son of Maaseiah, to the prophet Jeremiah to ask God why Nebuchadnezzar had declared war against Judah; they suspected that God was going to make Nebuchadnezzar withdraw from besieging them. Jeremiah responds to Pashhur and Zephaniah and tells them that God declares what will happen if Zedekiah does not surrender to Nebuchadnezzar—his people will die by the sword, pestilence, and famine, but if he surrenders they will survive. In Jeremiah 22, Jeremiah advises Zedekiah to act with justice and righteousness and warns him what will happen if he does not obey God's word. (Jeremiah 21:1–9, 22:1–7) In Jeremiah 24, God shows Jeremiah a vision of two baskets of figs placed before a temple, one filled with good, ripe figs, and the other filled with bad figs. God compares Zedekiah and his officials to the bad figs and states that they will be destroyed by sword, famine, and pestilence. Jeremiah had previously advised Zedekiah at the beginning of his reign to submit to Babylon and to not listen to false prophets like Hananiah who prophesied that he would not have to serve Babylon. (24)

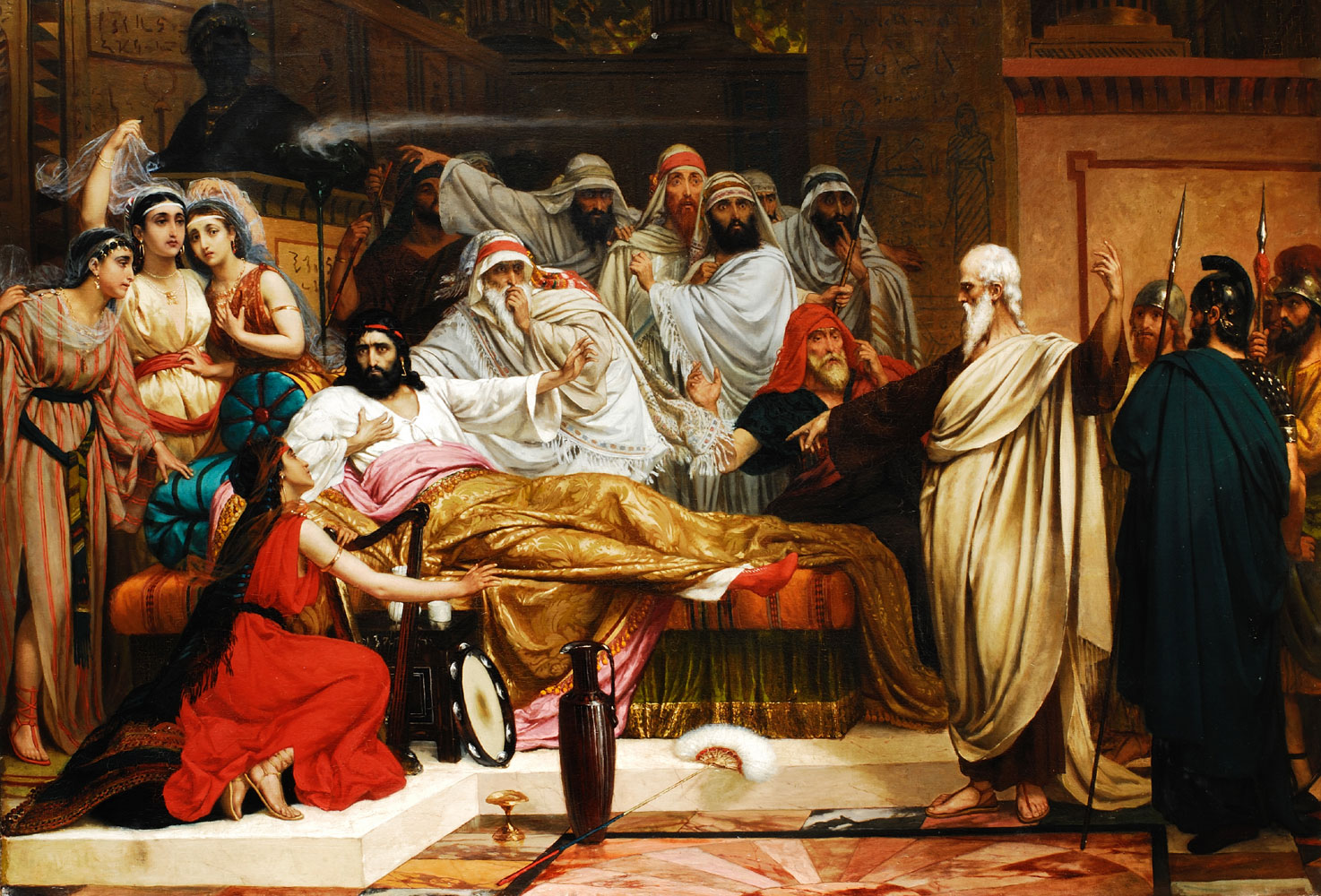
The prophet Jeremiah prophesies the downfall of Jerusalem to King Zedekiah (painting by Joseph Stallaert)

In Zedekiah's tenth year, he imprisons Jeremiah in his palace because Jeremiah had prophesied that Jerusalem would be captured by Nebuchadnezzar. Subsequently, Jeremiah prophesies that Zedekiah will die in peace and have a traditional funeral like the kings before him, but he will be captured by Babylon. Later, Zedekiah made a covenant with his people to free all Hebrew slaves, but they were re-enslaved by their captors. God speaks through Jeremiah and notes that Zedekiah did what was right by freeing the Hebrew slaves, but he broke his own covenant by allowing them to be re-enslaved. (34) Zedekiah sends Jehucal, the son of Shelemiah, and Zephaniah the priest to ask Jeremiah to pray for them when Apries's army had threatened the Babylonians enough to retreat from sieging Jerusalem. Jeremiah once again responds that the Babylonians will come back and capture the city.

Previously, when Jeremiah had been imprisoned in the house of Jonathan the secretary in suspicion that he was defecting to the Babylonians, Zedekiah secretly questioned him and asked if there was any word from God, to which Jeremiah responded that there was, that Zedekiah will be captured by Nebuchadnezzar. Jeremiah pleads that he will die if he is sent back to Jonathan's house so Zedekiah transferred him to the court of the guard and ordered that a loaf of bread be given to him daily. Zedekiah refuses his officials' pleas to execute Jeremiah for his prophecies and instead lets them do what they want with Jeremiah, that is throwing him into a cistern belonging to Zedekiah's son Malchiah. Ebed-melech, a servant, heard this and went to Zedekiah (who was at the Benjamin Gate) to tell him that Jeremiah would die if he was not saved from the pit. Zedekiah commanded Ebed-melech to take thirty-men to lift Jeremiah from the cistern. Jeremiah then warns Zedekiah again that he shall be spared if he obeys God and surrenders to Babylon, but if he does not Jerusalem will be destroyed and he will not escape from Nebuchadnezzar.

== Aftermath ==
Upon the fall of Jerusalem, the former Kingdom of Judah was absorbed into the Neo-Babylonian Empire and reorganized to become Yehud province. Nebuchadnezzar transferred the administrative center from Jerusalem to Mizpah and appointed Gedaliah ben Aḥikam as governor of the province, under the watchful eye of a Babylonian guard (2 Kings 25:22–24, Jeremiah 40:6–8).

On hearing this news, all the Jews in Moab, Ammon, Edom, and Aram-Damascus returned to Judah (Jeremiah 40:11–12). However, the subsequent assassination of Gedaliah led most of the population of Judah to flee to Egypt for safety (2 Kings 25:26, Jeremiah 43:5–7) In Egypt, they settled in Migdol, Tahpanhes, Noph, and Pathros. (Jeremiah 44:1).

== Chronological dispute ==
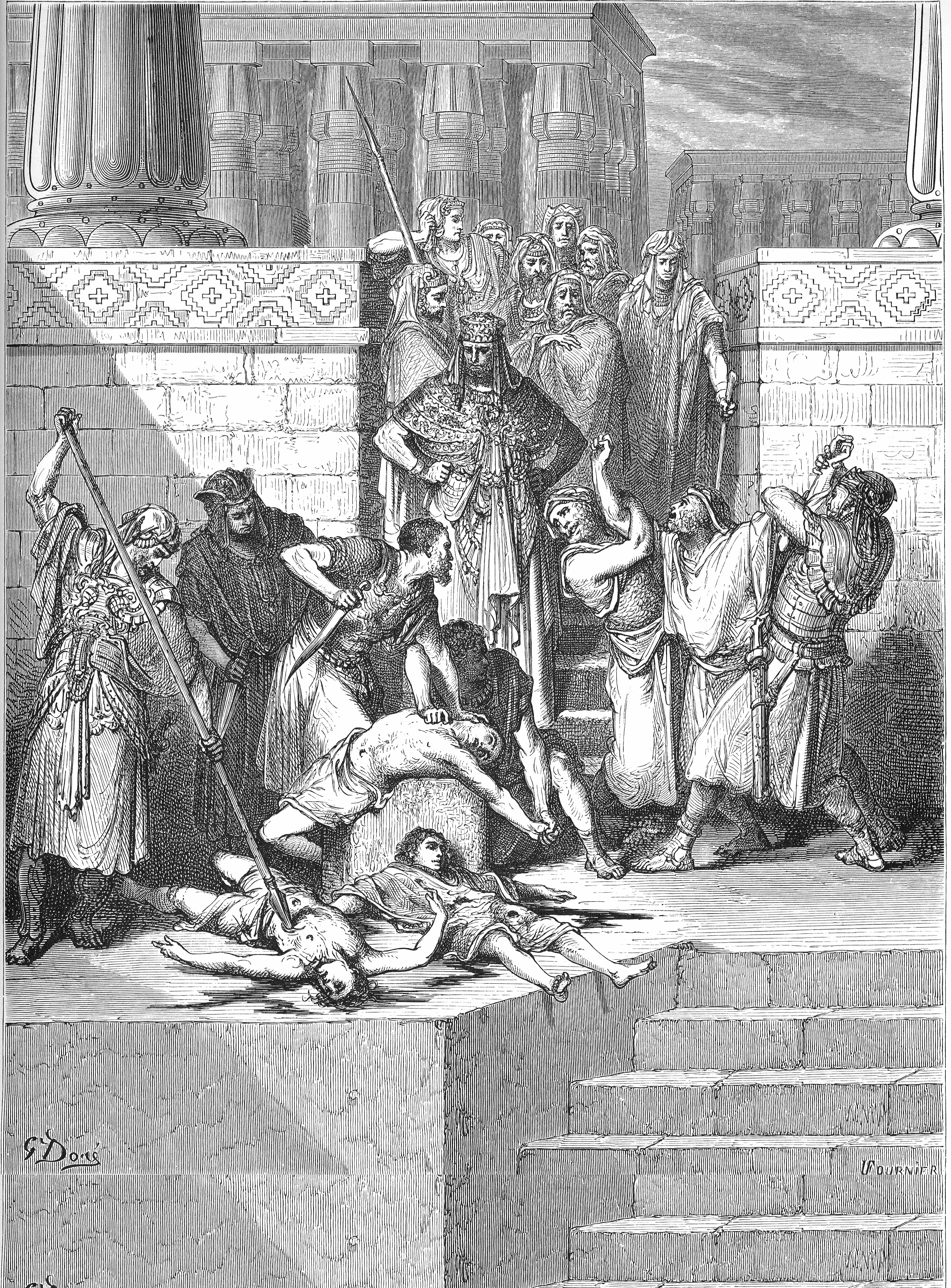
Zedekiah's sons are slaughtered before his eyes, by Gustave Doré.

The Babylonian Chronicles give 2 Adar (16 March), 597 BC, as the date that Nebuchadnezzar captured Jerusalem. At that time, Nebuchadnezzar deposed King Jeconiah and installed Zedekiah—Jeconiah's uncle—in his place. Zedekiah's installation as king by Nebuchadnezzar can therefore be firmly dated to the early spring of 597 BC.

Historically there has been considerable controversy over the date when Jerusalem was captured the second time and Zedekiah's reign came to an end. There is no dispute about the month: it was the summer month of Tammuz (Jeremiah 52:6). The problem has been to determine the year. It was noted above that Albright preferred 587 BC and Thiele advocated 586 BC, and this division among scholars has persisted until the present time. If Zedekiah's years are by accession counting, whereby the year he came to the throne was considered his "zero" year and his first full year in office, 597/596, was counted as year one, Zedekiah's eleventh year, the year the city fell, would be 587/586. Since Judean regnal years were measured from Tishrei in the fall, this would place the end of his reign and the capture of the city in the summer of 586 BC. Accession counting was the rule for most, but not all, of the kings of Judah, whereas "non-accession" counting was the rule for most, but not all, of the kings of Israel.

The publication of the Babylonian Chronicles in 1956 yielded evidence that the years of Zedekiah were measured in a non-accession sense. According to this method, 598/597 BC—the year Zedekiah was installed by Nebuchadnezzar according to Judah's Tishrei-based calendar—is considered to be "year one" of Zedekiah's reign. Therefore, the fall of Jerusalem in his eleventh year would have been in year 588/587 BC, i.e. in the summer of 587 BC.

The Babylonian Chronicles allow the fairly precise dating of the capture of Jeconiah and the start of Zedekiah's reign, and they also give the accession year of Nebuchadnezzar's successor Amel-Marduk (Evil Merodach) as 562/561 BC, which was the 37th year of Jeconiah's captivity according to 2 Kings 25:27. These Babylonian records related to Jeconiah's reign are consistent with the fall of the city in 587 but not in 586, thus supporting Albright's date. Nevertheless, scholars who assume that Zedekiah's reign should be calculated by accession reckoning continue to adhere to the 586 date.

== Talmud ==
According to this tradition, Nebuchadnezzar died on the 25th day of the Hebrew month of Adar. His successor, Evil-Merodach (also spelled Evil-merodoch), took office the next day, the 26th of Adar, and released the imprisoned Judean kings Jehoiachin and Zedekiah on the 27th of Adar. Although released, the midrash states that Zedekiah, who had been blinded and in chains for many years (Jeremiah 52:11), died within that same month.This allowed him to symbolically outlive his captor and tormentor, Nebuchadnezzar, by a short time.

== Book of Mormon ==
According to the Book of Mormon, a religious text in the Latter Day Saint movement, Zedekiah had a son named Mulek, who escaped death and traveled across the ocean to the Americas, where he founded the Mulekite nation. The Mulekites later merged with another Israelite splinter group—the Nephites—to form one nation, which retained the Nephite name.

== Genealogical note ==
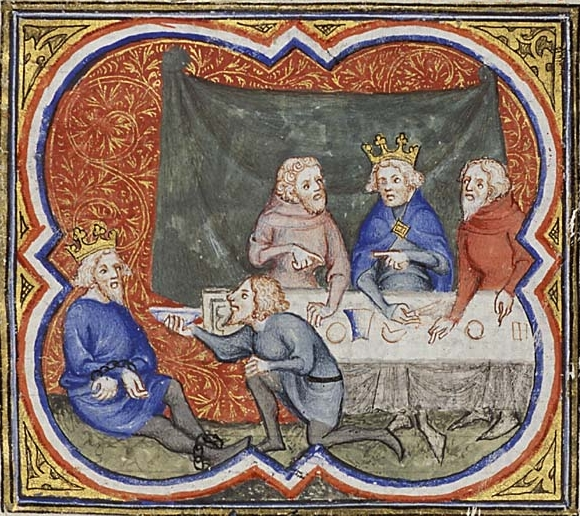
Zedekiah is chained and brought before Nebuchadnezzar.

Zedekiah (whose name at birth was Mattaniah) was the third of Josiah's four sons. His three brothers were Eliakim (born c. 634 BC), Shallum (born c. 633 BC), and Johanan. Hamutal—the daughter of Jeremiah of Libnah—was mother to Mattaniah and his older brother Shallum, while Zebidah—the niece of Pedaiah—was mother to Eliakim. Zedekiah had multiple wives, sons, and daughters, but only one son is named in the Bible, Malchiah.

Shallum succeeded Josiah as king of Judah, under the name Jehoahaz. Shallum was succeeded by Eliakim, under the name Jehoiakim. Jehoiakim was succeeded by his own son Jeconiah.

Nebuchadnezzar II deposed Jeconiah and installed his uncle Mattaniah on the throne, under the name Zedekiah. Zedekiah was the last king of Judah before the kingdom was conquered by Babylon and the people exiled.

== In films ==
Year	Film	Actor
1998	Jeremiah	Vincent Regan
2012	Amazing Love: The Story of Hosea	Herzl Tobey
2013	The Bible (Episode 5: "Survival")	Samuel Collings

== See also ==
- Zedekiah's Cave

== Notes ==
Zedekiah House of David
Regnal titles
Preceded by Jehoiachin	King of Judah; 597–587 or 586 BC	Judah conquered by Nebuchadnezzar II of Babylon
Preceded by Jehoiachin	Leader of the House of David	Succeeded by Shealtiel
