= 2 Chronicles 34 =

Second Book of Chronicles, chapter 34

- ← chapter 33 chapter 35 →
- The complete Hebrew text of the Books of Chronicles (1st and 2nd Chronicles) in the Leningrad Codex (1008 CE).
- Book: Books of Chronicles
- Category: Ketuvim
- Christian Bible part: Old Testament
- Order in the Christian part: 14

2 Chronicles 34 is the thirty-fourth chapter of the Second Book of Chronicles in the Old Testament of the Christian Bible or of the second part of the Books of Chronicles in the Hebrew Bible. The book was compiled from older sources by an unknown person or group, designated by modern scholars as "the Chronicler", and had the final shape established in late fifth or fourth century BCE. This chapter belongs to the section focusing on the kingdom of Judah until its destruction by the Babylonians under Nebuchadnezzar and the beginning of restoration under Cyrus the Great of Persia (2 Chronicles 10 to 36). It contains the regnal accounts of Josiah the king of Judah.

== Text ==
This chapter was originally written in the Hebrew language and is divided into 33 verses.

=== Textual witnesses ===
Some early manuscripts containing the text of this chapter in Hebrew are of the Masoretic Text tradition, which includes the Codex Leningradensis (1008). (Note: Since 1947 the current text of Aleppo Codex is missing 2 Chronicles 26:19–35:7.)

There is also a translation into Koine Greek known as the Septuagint, made in the last few centuries BCE. Extant ancient manuscripts of the Septuagint version include Codex Vaticanus (B; $\mathfrak{G}$^{B}; 4th century), and Codex Alexandrinus (A; $\mathfrak{G}$^{A}; 5th century). (Note: The whole book of 2 Chronicles is missing from the extant Codex Sinaiticus.)

=== Old Testament references ===
- 2 Chronicles 34:1–2: 2 Kings 22:1–2
- 2 Chronicles 34:3–7: 1 Kings 13:1–10; 2 Kings 23:4–20
- 2 Chronicles 34:8–13: 2 Kings 22:3–7
- 2 Chronicles 34:14–21: 2 Kings 22:8–13
- 2 Chronicles 34:22–28: 2 Kings 22:14–20
- 2 Chronicles 34:29–33: 2 Kings 23:1–3

== Josiah king of Judah (34:1–7) ==
While 2 Kings 22–23 record Josiah's deed from the eighteenth year of his reign, the Chronicler noted that since he was still young (16 years old), Josiah already started to 'seek God', but as he was not yet of age, the public measures he planned were carried out in the twelfth year of his reign (when he was considered an adult at 20 years of age, verse 3). The inclusion of the area used to belong to the former northern kingdom in his reform showed a legitimate control of the whole Israel (cf. verses 9, 21, 33) and later in 35:17–18. The phrase 'he returned to Jerusalem' (cf. 2 Kings 23:20) underlines the direct involvement of the king for the reform.

=== Verse 1 ===
Josiah was eight years old when he began to reign, and he reigned thirty-one years in Jerusalem.

- "Thirty-one years": according to Thiele's chronology, following "accession year method", Josiah started to reign between September 641 and September 640 BCE until his death in the month of Tammuz (25 June-23 July) 609 BCE.

=== Verse 3 ===
For in the eighth year of his reign, while he was yet young, he began to seek after the God of David his father: and in the twelfth year he began to purge Judah and Jerusalem from the high places, and the groves, and the carved images, and the molten images.

- "High places": are "places for pagan worship".
- "The groves": from Hebrews: asherim (2 Kings 23:4; 2 Kings 6:7; 2 Kings 6:14), "wooden images" (NKJV); "Asherah poles" (MEV, NET Bible), were built since the time of Solomon.

== The Book of the Law found (34:8–21) ==
The collection of donations for the temple's improvement was described in more detail in verses 8–13 than in 2 Kings 22 with the collection of tithes from the entire population (cf. 2 Chronicles 24:5–9 and David's approach for temple's construction (1 Chronicles 29), emphasizing the co-operation of all inhabitants, including people from the north. The Levites have similar duties as in 1 Chronicles 26. The discovery account of the Book of Law (verses 14–33) is very similar to 2 Kings 22, with some minor details, especially linking the finding of the book to the exemplary behavior of Josiah and his people. The Chronicles record that this is "the book of the law, which was written by Moses", so it was not only Deuteronomy, but the entire Pentateuch. Therefore, Shaphan read 'from' it (cf. "read it" in 2 Kings 22) rather than 'all of it', before the king (cf. verse 18). The Chronicles clarify in verse 24 about 'all the curses that are written in the book', instead of 'all the words of the book' in 2 Kings 22, which refer to Deuteronomy 27–29 (and Leviticus 26).

=== Verse 8 ===
Now in the eighteenth year of his reign, when he had purged the land, and the house, he sent Shaphan the son of Azaliah, and Maaseiah the governor of the city, and Joah the son of Joahaz the recorder, to repair the house of the Lord his God.

- "Shaphan" (Hebrew: שפן, which means "hyrax, rock badger, coney"), son of Azaliah, a scribe or secretary of Josiah's court who was mentioned several times in the Hebrew Bible (2 Kings 22:3–14, 25:22; parallels in 2 Chronicles 34:8–20; Jeremiah 26:24; 36:10–12; 39:14; 40:5ff; and 43:6). He had at least sons named in the Hebrew Bible: Ahikam (Jeremiah 26:24; 40:5; 2 Kings 25:22), Elasah (Jeremiah 29:3), Gemariah (Jeremiah 36:10–12) and Jaazaniah, who was among the idol worshippers seen in vision of Ezekiel (Ezekiel 8:11). His grandson were Micaiah, the son of Gemariah (Jeremiah 36:10–12) and Gedaliah, the son of Ahikam, the short-lived governor of Judah appointed by Nebuchadnezzar after the destruction of Jerusalem in 586 BCE (39:14; 40:5 and 43:6). The name "Shaphan" is attested in a bulla discovered during the excavations at the City of David headed by Israeli archeologist Yigal Shiloh in the layer of destruction by the Babylonians in ca. 586 BCE, with the inscription belonging to Gemaryahu ben Shaphan, identified with "Gemariah the son of Shaphan the scribe" (Jeremiah 36:10), although it is equally possible that there is no connection between the names found on the bullae and the person mentioned in the Bible.
- "Azaliah": (cf. "Azaliah, the son of Meshullam" 2 Kings 22:3) may be attested by a bulla with the inscription "belonging to Azaliahu son of Meshullam" according to archaeologist Nahman Avigad.

=== Verse 9 ===
When they came to Hilkiah the high priest, they delivered the money that was brought into the house of God, which the Levites, the keepers of the door, had collected from the hand of Manasseh and Ephraim, and from all the remnant of Israel, and from all Judah and Benjamin, and from the inhabitants of Jerusalem.

- "Hilkiah" (Hebrew: חִלְקִיָּה Ḥilqîyāhū, "my portion is Yah"): Hilkiah's preaching may have encourage Josiah to restore the worship of Yahweh, God of Israel, in the kingdom of Judah. The name is attested in extra-biblical sources by at least two artifacts: (1) a clay bulla found in 1980 inscribed with the text "(Belonging) to Hanan, son (of) Hilkiah the priest" in reverse paleo-Hebrew letters (so that the letters will read properly when impressed in a lump of clay); (2) a bulla found in the eastern slope of Jerusalem during excavations in 1982 (among fifty-one bullae dated between Josiah's rule and the destruction of the city by the Babylonian king Nebuchadnezzar II in 586 BCE) with the inscription: "(Belonging) to Azaryah, son (of) Hilkiah". Both seals seem to be engraved by the same master engraver, and both owners likely held a sacerdotal function in the Temple of Jerusalem, with Azaryah (identified as "Azaryah IV" by archaeologists) becoming the successor of Hilkiah as high priest (1 Chronicles 5:39; 9:11). Hilkiah may also be the father of prophet Jeremiah or (could be another) Jeremiah of Libnah, and would have lived in Anathoth in the land of Benjamin.
- "And from the inhabitants of": translated from Hebrew consonantal ketiv ("[what is] written") text וישבי, wə-yō-šə-ḇê, "and the residents of"; the marginal reading (qere) is וישבו, wa-yā-šu-ḇū, "and they returned to" (KJV) or "and which they had brought back to" (NKJV).

=== Verse 20 ===
Then the king commanded Hilkiah, Ahikam the son of Shaphan, Abdon the son of Micah, Shaphan the scribe, and Asaiah a servant of the king, saying,

- Cross reference: 2 Kings 22:12
- "Hilkiah": see verse 9
- "Ahikam the son of Shaphan": see Shaphan in verse 8
- "Abdon the son of Micah": written as "Achbor the son of Michaiah" in 2 Kings 22:12.
- "Asaiah, a servant of king" may be attested by a seal with the inscription Asayahu servant of the king from the period of Josiah's reign.

== Huldah prophesies disaster (34:22–28) ==
The prophetess Huldah pointed out the inevitability that the kingdom of Judah would suffer destruction because of the people's apostasy, although she showed supports for Josiah's reforms and indicated that Josiah's righteousness would earn him a peaceful death before the catastrophe struck.

== Josiah restores true worship (34:29–33) ==
In verse 30, 'the Levites' replaced 'the prophets' in 2 Kings 22, indicating the Chronicler's conviction that in that period the Levites had a role of announcing God's word, although the prophets still had their place of honour in the books of Chronicles. Verse 33 is an extremely shortened summary of 2 Kings 23:4–20, which together with verses. 3–7, show two different forms of cleansing.

== See also ==
- Huldah
- Tribe of Benjamin
- Tribe of Ephraim
- Tribe of Judah
- Tribe of Manasseh
- Related Bible parts: Deuteronomy 29, 2 Kings 22, 2 Kings 23, 2 Chronicles 35

== Sources ==
- Ackroyd, Peter R (1993). "Chronicles, Books of". In Metzger, Bruce M; Coogan, Michael D (eds.). The Oxford Companion to the Bible. Oxford University Press. pp. 113–116. ISBN 978-0195046458.
- Bennett, William (2018). The Expositor's Bible: The Books of Chronicles. Litres. ISBN 978-5040825196.
- Coogan, Michael David (2007). Coogan, Michael David; Brettler, Marc Zvi; Newsom, Carol Ann; Perkins, Pheme (eds.). The New Oxford Annotated Bible with the Apocryphal/Deuterocanonical Books: New Revised Standard Version, Issue 48 (Augmented 3rd ed.). Oxford University Press. ISBN 9780195288810.
- Dietrich, Walter (2007). "13. 1 and 2 Kings". In Barton, John; Muddiman, John (eds.). The Oxford Bible Commentary (first (paperback) ed.). Oxford University Press. pp. 232–615. ISBN 978-0199277186.
- Hallo, William W., ed. (1997–2002). The Context of Scripture. Brill. ISBN 9789004131057. OCLC 902087326. (3 Volumes)
- Mathys, H. P. (2007). "14. 1 and 2 Chronicles". In Barton, John; Muddiman, John (eds.). The Oxford Bible Commentary (first (paperback) ed.). Oxford University Press. pp. 267–308. ISBN 978-0199277186.
- McFall, Leslie (1991), "Translation Guide to the Chronological Data in Kings and Chronicles" (PDF), Bibliotheca Sacra, 148: 3–45, archived from the original (PDF) on August 27, 2010
- Nelson, Thomas (2014). NIV, Chronological Study Bible, EBook: Holy Bible, New International Version. Brazil: Thomas Nelson. ISBN 978-1-4016-8013-8.
- Sweeney, Marvin (2007). I & II Kings: A Commentary. Westminster John Knox Press. ISBN 978-0-664-22084-6.
- Thiele, Edwin R. (1983). The Mysterious Numbers of the Hebrew Kings (3rd ed.). Grand Rapids, Michigan: Zondervan. ISBN 978-0-310-36010-0.
- Ulrich, Eugene, ed. (2010). The Biblical Qumran Scrolls: Transcriptions and Textual Variants. Brill.
- Würthwein, Ernst (1995). The Text of the Old Testament. Translated by Rhodes, Erroll F. Grand Rapids, MI: Wm. B. Eerdmans. ISBN 0-8028-0788-7.
