= 2 Kings 22 =

2 Kings, chapter 22

- ← chapter 21 chapter 23 →
- The pages containing the Books of Kings (1 & 2 Kings) Leningrad Codex (1008 CE).
- Book: Second Book of Kings
- Hebrew Bible part: Nevi'im
- Order in the Hebrew part: 4
- Category: Former Prophets
- Christian Bible part: Old Testament
- Order in the Christian part: 12

2 Kings 22 is the twenty-second chapter of the second part of the Books of Kings in the Hebrew Bible or the Second Book of Kings in the Old Testament of the Christian Bible. The book is a compilation of various annals recording the acts of the kings of Israel and Judah by a Deuteronomic compiler in the seventh century BCE, with a supplement added in the sixth century BCE. This chapter records the events during the reign of Josiah, the king of Judah, especially the discovery of the Book of the Law (Torah) during the renovation of the Temple in Jerusalem.

== Text ==
This chapter was originally written in the Hebrew language. It is divided into 20 verses.

=== Textual witnesses ===
Some early manuscripts containing the text of this chapter in Biblical Hebrew are of the Masoretic Text tradition, which includes the Aleppo Codex (10th century), Codex Leningradensis (1008), and the Codex Cairensis (11th century).

There is also a translation into Koine Greek known as the Septuagint, made in the last few centuries BCE. Extant ancient manuscripts of the Septuagint version include Codex Vaticanus (B; $\mathfrak{G}$^{B}; 4th century) and Codex Alexandrinus (A; $\mathfrak{G}$^{A}; 5th century). (Note: The whole book of 2 Kings is missing from the extant Codex Sinaiticus.)

=== Old Testament references ===
- 2 Kings 22:1–2: 2 Chronicles 34:1–2
- 2 Kings 22:3–7: 2 Chronicles 34:8–13
- 2 Kings 22:8–13: 2 Chronicles 34:14–21
- 2 Kings 22:14–20: 2 Chronicles 34:22–28

== Analysis ==
A parallel pattern of sequence is observed in the final sections of 2 Kings between 2 Kings 11–20 and 2 Kings 21–25, as follows:

A. Athaliah, daughter of Ahab, kills royal seed (2 Kings 11:1)

B. Joash reigns (2 Kings 11–12)

C. Quick sequence of kings of Israel and Judah (2 Kings 13–16)

D. Fall of Samaria (2 Kings 17)

E. Revival of Judah under Hezekiah (2 Kings 18–20)

A'. Manasseh, a king like Ahab, promotes idolatry and kills the innocence (2 Kings 21)

B'. Josiah reigns (2 Kings 22–23)

C'. Quick succession of kings of Judah (2 Kings 24)

D'. Fall of Jerusalem (2 Kings 25)

E'. Elevation of Jehoiachin (2 Kings 25:27–30)

2 Kings 22–23:30 mainly contains the story of Josiah's actions of his eighteenth year (22:3; 23:23) and the discovery of the book of the law (22:8-10; 23:24) as grouped based on five royal initiatives (using distinct verbs "send" and "command"):

1. Discovery of the book (22:3–11; "sent," 22:3)
2. Inquiry about the book (22:12–20; "commanded," 22:12)
3. Covenant and the book (23:1–3; "sent," 23:1)
4. Reforms from the book (23:4–20; "commanded," 23:4)
5. Passover from the book (23:21–24; "commanded," 23:21)

== Josiah king of Judah (22:1–7) ==
The account of Josiah ben Amon as the king of Judah is bracketed by the introductory regnal form in 2 Kings 22:1–2 and the concluding regnal form in 2 Kings 23:28–30, as the body in 2 Kings 22:3–23:27 highlights the religious reform and national restoration. The life of Josiah shows some similarities to the life of Joash, king of Judah, in that:

- both ascended the throne at a very young age (Josiah was 8 years old, 2 Kings 22:1; cf. Joash/Jehoash was 7 years old, 2 Kings 11:21)
- at the age of 18, both repaired the Temple, reversing the acts of the last ruler before them (Joash replaced Athaliah; Josiah succeeded Manasseh).
- the key event in Josiah's reign was the discovery of the book of law (Hebrew: "book of the Torah") in the temple by Hilkiah the priest (2 Kings 22:8-13), a person with similar stature as Jehoiada, the priest in Joash's reign.

In 625 BCE Babylon achieved independence under Nabopolassar and in 612 BCE took the Assyrian capital Nineveh. This situation enables the kingdom of Judah, not under the threat of the Assyrians anymore, could make internal changes, including religious reforms.

Verses 3–7 records the instruction of Josiah, through the scribe Shaphan ben Azaliah ben Meshullam, to the high priest Hilkiah to lead the renovation of the Temple in Jerusalem.

=== Verse 3 ===
And it came to pass in the eighteenth year of king Josiah, that the king sent Shaphan the son of Azaliah, the son of Meshullam, the scribe, to the house of the LORD, saying,

- "Shaphan" (Hebrew: שפן, which means "hyrax, rock badger, coney"), son of Azaliah, a scribe or secretary of Josiah's court who was mentioned several times in the Hebrew Bible (2 Kings 22:3–14, 25:22; parallels in 2 Chronicles 34:8–20; Jeremiah 26:24; 36:10–12; 39:14; 40:5ff; and 43:6). He had at least sons named in the Hebrew Bible: Ahikam (Jeremiah 26:24; 40:5; 2 Kings 25:22), Elasah (Jeremiah 29:3), Gemariah (Jeremiah 36:10–12) and Jaazaniah, who was among the idol worshippers seen in vision of Ezekiel (Ezekiel 8:11). His grandson were Micaiah, the son of Gemariah (Jeremiah 36:10–12) and Gedaliah, the son of Ahikam, the short-lived governor of Judah appointed by Nebuchadnezzar after the destruction of Jerusalem in 586 BCE (39:14; 40:5 and 43:6). The name "Shaphan" is attested in a bullae discovered during the excavations at the City of David headed by Israeli archeologist Yigal Shiloh in the layer of destruction by the Babylonians in ca. 586 BCE, with the inscription belonging to Gemaryahu ben Shaphan, identified with "Gemariah the son of Shaphan the scribe" (Jeremiah 36:10), although it is equally possible that there is no connection between the names found on the bullae and the person mentioned in the Bible.
- "Azaliah, the son of Meshullam" (cf. 2 Chronicles 34:8) may be attested by a bulla with the inscription "belonging to Azaliahu son of Meshullam" according to archaeologist Nahman Avigad.

== The Book of the Law was discovered (22:8–13) ==
Hilkiah reported to Shaphan about the discovery of a book of Torah in the temple during the renovations.(verse 8; cf. 2 Kings 12). Critical studies suggest that the discovered book was Deuteronomy or its core (Deuteronomy 6ab–28), which contains the speech made by Moses shortly before his death and might include some older materials as well. The closing admonitions (Deuteronomy 28), the strict demand for the exclusive worship of YHWH (Deuteronomy 6:5) and the cultic veneration of YHWH alone in the central holy site of Jerusalem (Deuteronomy 12) would impress Josiah, and rules such as the social laws of Deuteronomy (e.g. Deuteronomy 15: 24) would become state law during his reign. Shaphan's report to King Josiah concerning the discovery of the Torah scroll and read the document (verses 9–10), causing Josiah's distress on hearing the words and his command to a delegation including Hilkiah the priest, Shaphan the scribe, and others to make an inquiry of YHWH to determine the significance of this discovery (verses 11–13), which led them to the home of the prophetess, Huldah, wife of Shallum ben Harhas, the keeper of garments.

=== Verse 8 ===
And Hilkiah the high priest said unto Shaphan the scribe, I have found the book of the law in the house of the Lord. And Hilkiah gave the book to Shaphan, and he read it.

- "Hilkiah" (Hebrew: חִלְקִיָּה Ḥilqīyyāhū, "my portion is Yahweh"): Hilkiah's preaching may have encouraged Josiah to restore the worship of Yahweh as God of the Israelites in the kingdom of Judah. The name is attested in extra-biblical sources by at least two artifacts: (1) a clay bulla found in 1980 inscribed with the text "(Belonging) to Hanan, son (of) Hilkiah the priest" in reversed paleo-Hebrew letters so the letters would read properly when impressed in a lump of clay; (2) a bulla found in the eastern slope of Jerusalem during excavations in 1982 (among fifty-one bullae dated between Josiah's rule and the destruction of the city by the Babylonian king Nebuchadnezzar II in 586 BCE) with the inscription: "(Belonging) to Azaryah, son (of) Hilkiah". Both seals seem to be engraved by the same master engraver. Both owners likely held a sacerdotal function in the Temple of Jerusalem, with Azaryah (identified as "Azaryah IV" by archaeologists) becoming the successor of Hilkiah as high priest (1 Chronicles 5:39; 9:11). Hilkiah may also be the father of prophet Jeremiah or (could be another) Jeremiah of Libnah, and would have lived in Anathoth in the land of Benjamin.

=== Verse 12 ===
And the king commanded Hilkiah the priest, and Ahikam the son of Shaphan, and Achbor the son of Michaiah, and Shaphan the scribe, and Asahiah a servant of the king's, saying,

- Cross reference: 2 Chronicles 34:20
- "Achbor the son of Michaiah": written as "Abdon the son of Micah" in 2 Chronicles 34:20.
- "Asaiah, a servant of king's" may be attested by a seal with the inscription Asayahu servant of the king from the period of Josiah's reign.

== Huldah's prophecy (22:14–20) ==
The prophetess Huldah pointed out the inevitability that the kingdom of Judah would suffer destruction because of the people's apostasy, although she showed supports for Josiah's reforms and indicated that Josiah's righteousness would earn him a peaceful death before the catastrophe struck.

=== Verse 20 ===
"Surely, therefore, I will gather you to your fathers, and you shall be gathered to your grave in peace; and your eyes shall not see all the calamity which I will bring on this place." So they brought back word to the king.

- "Gather you to your fathers" or "Cause you to join your ancestors in death"

== Archaeology ==
Two ostraca were found in 1997 (Shlomo Moussaieff #1 and #2) that seems to strengthen the evidence for a temple renovation during the reign of Josiah (see Bordreuil, Israel, and Pardee 1996 and 1998), but these artifacts did not come from regular excavations, so there is a suspicion of modern forgery. The first ostracon has a five-line inscription that records a royal contribution of three shekel of silver by a king ʾAshyahu to the temple of Yahweh to be made through a royal functionary named Zakaryahu, dated by palaeography to the time of Josiah. The name "Ashyahu" is determined as a short form of Yo’shiyahu ("Josiah"). The second ostracon contains a widow's plea about an inheritance which mentions Josiah's name and a short quote from Psalm 22:11.

== Illustration ==
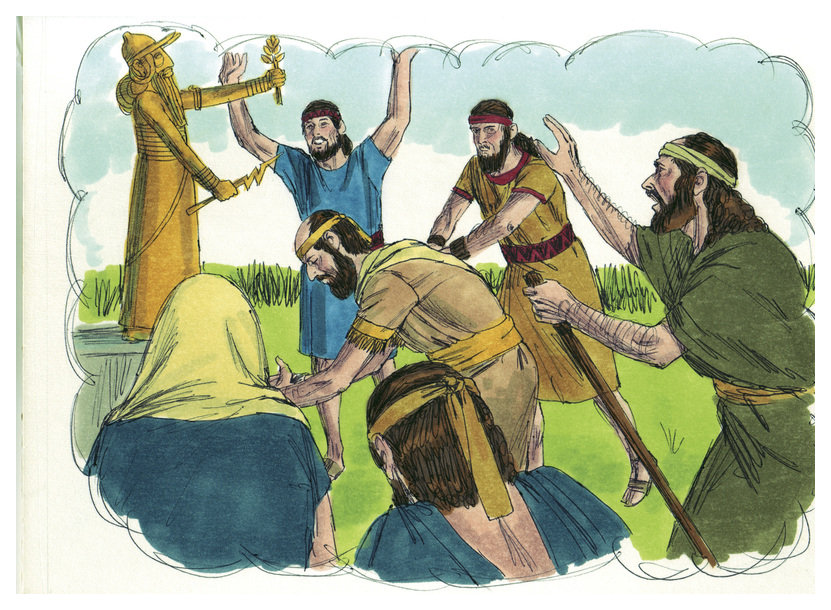
People of Judah worshipped idols

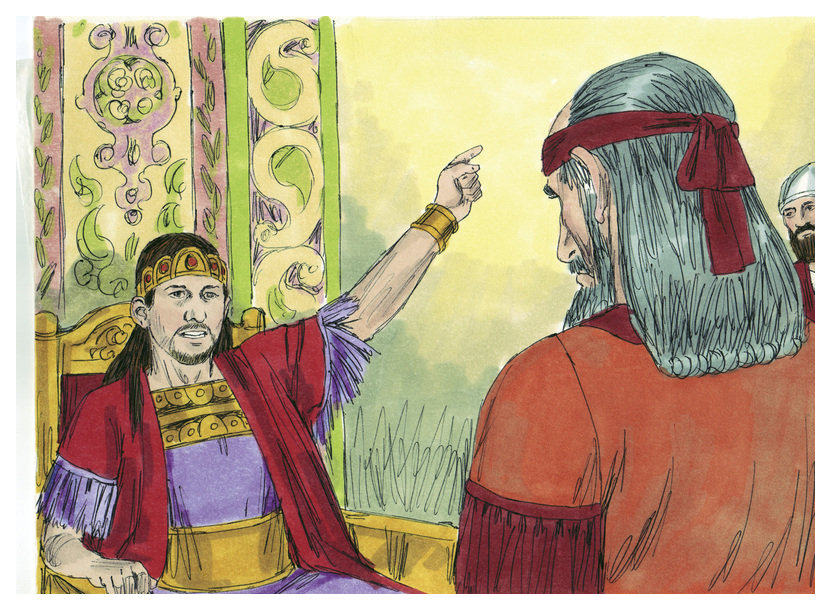
King Josiah ordered Shaphan the scribe to go to the high priest Hilkiah

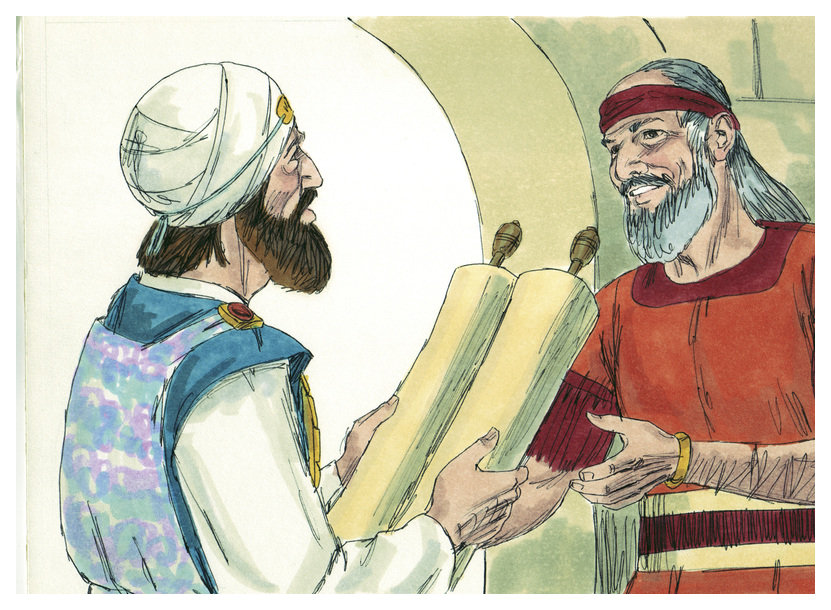
Hilkiah reported to Shaphan about the discovery of the Book of the Law

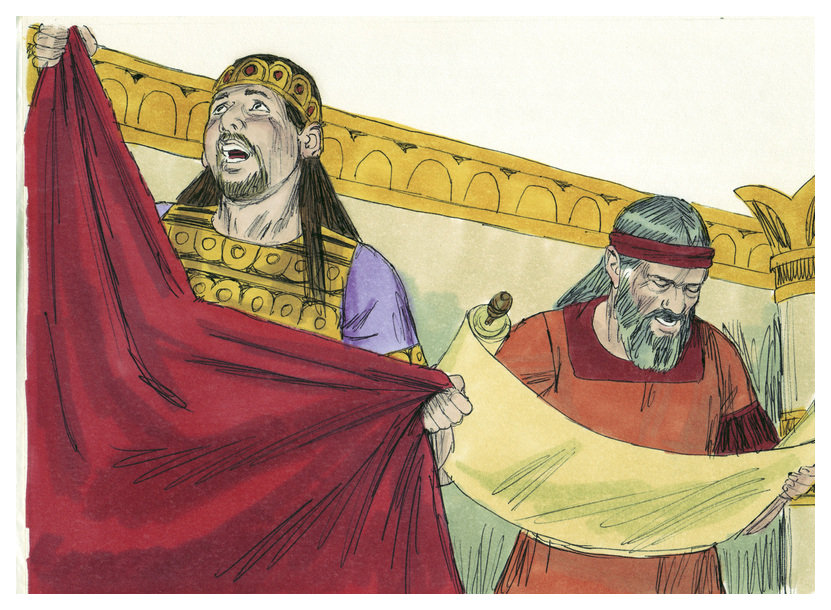
Josiah tore his clothes when Shaphan read the Book of the Law to him.

== See also ==
- Book of Deuteronomy
- Moses
- Torah
- Related Bible parts: Deuteronomy 31, 2 Kings 23, 2 Chronicles 34, Isaiah 40

== Sources ==
- Cogan, Mordechai; Tadmor, Hayim (1988). II Kings: A New Translation. Anchor Yale Bible Commentaries. Vol. 11. Doubleday. ISBN 9780385023887.
- Collins, John J. (2014). "Chapter 14: 1 Kings 12 – 2 Kings 25". Introduction to the Hebrew Scriptures. Fortress Press. pp. 277–296. ISBN 9781451469233.
- Coogan, Michael David (2007). Coogan, Michael David; Brettler, Marc Zvi; Newsom, Carol Ann; Perkins, Pheme (eds.). The New Oxford Annotated Bible with the Apocryphal/Deuterocanonical Books: New Revised Standard Version, Issue 48 (Augmented 3rd ed.). Oxford University Press. ISBN 9780195288810.
- Dietrich, Walter (2007). "13. 1 and 2 Kings". In Barton, John; Muddiman, John (eds.). The Oxford Bible Commentary (first (paperback) ed.). Oxford University Press. pp. 232–266. ISBN 978-0199277186.
- Fretheim, Terence E (1997). First and Second Kings. Westminster John Knox Press. ISBN 978-0-664-25565-7.
- Halley, Henry H. (1965). Halley's Bible Handbook: an abbreviated Bible commentary (24th (revised) ed.). Zondervan Publishing House. ISBN 0-310-25720-4.
- Hallo, William W., ed. (1997–2002). The Context of Scripture. Brill. ISBN 9789004131057. OCLC 902087326. (3 Volumes)
- Huey, F. B. (1993). The New American Commentary - Jeremiah, Lamentations: An Exegetical and Theological Exposition of Holy Scripture, NIV Text. B&H Publishing Group. ISBN 9780805401165.
- Leithart, Peter J. (2006). 1 & 2 Kings. Brazos Theological Commentary on the Bible. Brazos Press. ISBN 978-1587431258.
- McFall, Leslie (1991), "Translation Guide to the Chronological Data in Kings and Chronicles" (PDF), Bibliotheca Sacra, 148: 3–45, archived from the original (PDF) on August 27, 2010
- McKane, William (1993). "Kings, Book of". In Metzger, Bruce M; Coogan, Michael D (eds.). The Oxford Companion to the Bible. Oxford University Press. pp. 409–413. ISBN 978-0195046458.
- Nelson, Richard Donald (1987). First and Second Kings. Westminster John Knox Press. ISBN 978-0-664-22084-6.
- Pritchard, James B (1969). Ancient Near Eastern texts relating to the Old Testament (3 ed.). Princeton University Press. ISBN 9780691035031.
- Sweeney, Marvin (2007). I & II Kings: A Commentary. Westminster John Knox Press. ISBN 978-0-664-22084-6.
- Thiele, Edwin R. (1983). The Mysterious Numbers of the Hebrew Kings (3rd ed.). Grand Rapids, Michigan: Zondervan. ISBN 978-0-310-36010-0.
- Würthwein, Ernst (1995). The Text of the Old Testament. Translated by Rhodes, Erroll F. Grand Rapids, MI: Wm. B. Eerdmans. ISBN 0-8028-0788-7.
