= Jeremiah 26 =

Book of Jeremiah, chapter 26

- ← chapter 25 chapter 27 →
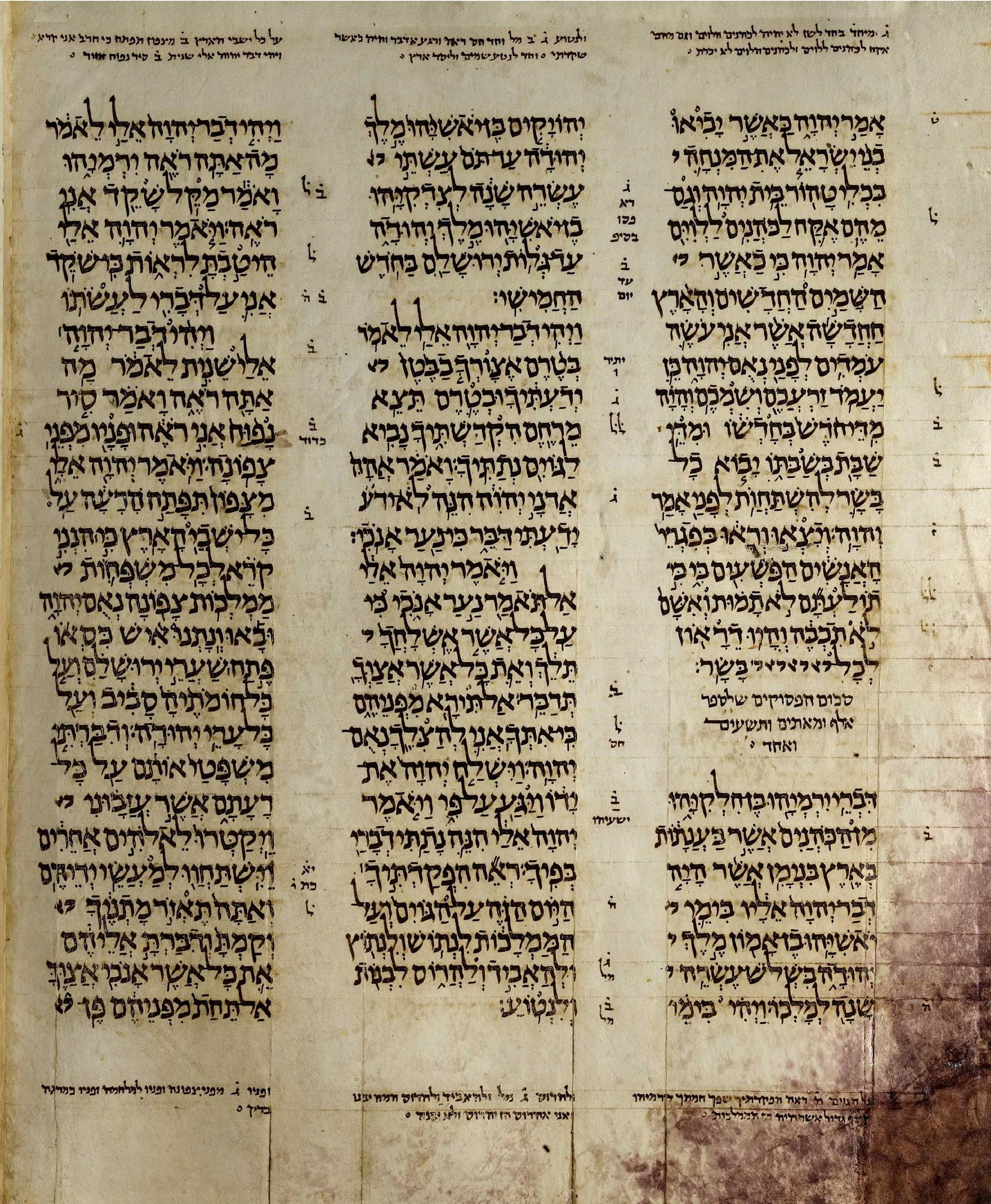
- A high resolution scan of the Aleppo Codex showing the Book of Jeremiah (the sixth book in Nevi'im).
- Book: Book of Jeremiah
- Hebrew Bible part: Nevi'im
- Order in the Hebrew part: 6
- Category: Latter Prophets
- Christian Bible part: Old Testament
- Order in the Christian part: 24

Jeremiah 26 is the twenty-sixth chapter of the Book of Jeremiah in the Hebrew Bible or the Old Testament of the Christian Bible. It is numbered as Jeremiah 33 in the Septuagint. This book contains prophecies attributed to the prophet Jeremiah, and is one of the Books of the Prophets. This chapter contains an exhortation to repentance (verses 1–6), causing Jeremiah to be apprehended and arraigned (verses 7–11); he gives his apology (verses 12–15), resulting the princes to clear him by the example of Micah (verses 16–19) and of Urijah (verses 20–23), and by the care of Ahikam (verse 24).

== Text ==
The original text of this chapter was written in the Hebrew language. This chapter is divided into 24 verses.

=== Textual witnesses ===
Some early manuscripts containing the text of this chapter in Hebrew are of the Masoretic Text tradition, which includes the Codex Cairensis (895), the Petersburg Codex of the Prophets (916), Aleppo Codex (10th century), Codex Leningradensis (1008). Some fragments containing parts of this chapter were found among the Dead Sea Scrolls, i.e., 4QJer^{a} (4Q70; 225–175 BCE) with extant verses 10, and 4QJer^{c} (4Q72; 1st century BC) with extant verses 10–13 (similar to Masoretic Text).

There is also a translation into Koine Greek known as the Septuagint (with a different chapter and verse numbering), made in the last few centuries BCE. Extant ancient manuscripts of the Septuagint version include Codex Vaticanus (B; $\mathfrak{G}$^{B}; 4th century), Codex Sinaiticus (S; BHK: $\mathfrak{G}$^{S}; 4th century), Codex Alexandrinus (A; $\mathfrak{G}$^{A}; 5th century) and Codex Marchalianus (Q; $\mathfrak{G}$^{Q}; 6th century).

== Parashot ==
The parashah sections listed here are based on the Aleppo Codex. Jeremiah 26 is a part of the Tenth prophecy (Jeremiah 26–29) in the section of Prophecies interwoven with narratives about the prophet's life (Jeremiah 26–45). {P}: open parashah; {S}: closed parashah.

{P} 26:1–6 {P} 26:7–10 {S} 26:11–15 {S} 26:16–24 {P}

== Verse numbering ==
The order of chapters and verses of the Book of Jeremiah in the English Bibles, Masoretic Text (Hebrew), and Vulgate (Latin), in some places differs from that in Septuagint (LXX, the Greek Bible used in the Eastern Orthodox Church and others) according to Rahlfs or Brenton. The following table is taken with minor adjustments from Brenton's Septuagint, page 971.

The order of Computer Assisted Tools for Septuagint/Scriptural Study (CATSS) based on Alfred Rahlfs' Septuaginta (1935), differs in some details from Joseph Ziegler's critical edition (1957) in Göttingen LXX. Swete's Introduction mostly agrees with Rahlfs edition (=CATSS).

Hebrew, Vulgate, English	Rahlfs' LXX (CATSS)	Brenton's LXX
26:1–24	33:1–24	
49:34	25:20	26:1
46:2–25, 27–28	26:2–25, 27–28	

== A warning to the cities of Judah (26:1–6) ==
=== Verse 1 ===
In the beginning of the reign of Jehoiakim the son of Josiah, king of Judah, this word came from the Lord:

The events of this chapter took place at "the beginning of the reign of Jehoiakim the son of Josiah, king of Judah", whereas the events of the previous chapter took place "in the fourth year of Jehoiakim the son of Josiah". Jehoiakim reigned from 609 to 598 BCE.

The New International Version uses less precise wording, Early in the reign ...

According to biblical scholar Michael Coogan, "in the beginning of the reign" technically refers to "the part of the year between the day the king ascended to the throne and the beginning of his first full year", which usually began in the spring month of Nisan (March–April).

== Jeremiah threatened with death (26:7–24) ==
=== Verse 18 ===
"Micah of Moresheth prophesied in the days of Hezekiah king of Judah, and spoke to all the people of Judah, saying,

'Thus says the Lord of hosts:
"Zion shall be plowed like a field,
Jerusalem shall become heaps of ruins,
And the mountain of the temple
Like the bare hills of the forest."'"

This prophecy of Micah is recorded in Micah 3:12.

- "Temple": literally "house".

=== Verse 24 ===
Nevertheless the hand of Ahikam the son of Shaphan was with Jeremiah, so that they should not give him into the hand of the people to put him to death.

Cross references: Jeremiah 39:14

- "Shaphan" (Hebrew: שפן, which means "hyrax, rock badger, coney"), son of Azaliah, a scribe or secretary of Josiah's court who was mentioned several times in the Hebrew Bible (2 Kings 22:3–14, 25:22; parallels in 2 Chronicles 34:8–20; Jeremiah 26:24; 36:10–12; 39:14; 40:5ff; and 43:6). He had at least sons named in the Hebrew Bible: Ahikam (Jeremiah 26:24; 40:5; 2 Kings 25:22), Elasah (Jeremiah 29:3), Gemariah (Jeremiah 36:10–12) and Jaazaniah, who was among the idol worshippers seen in vision of Ezekiel (Ezekiel 8:11). His grandson were Micaiah, the son of Gemariah (Jeremiah 36:10–12) and Gedaliah, the son of Ahikam, the short-lived governor of Judah appointed by Nebuchadnezzar after the destruction of Jerusalem in 586 BCE (39:14; 40:5 and 43:6). The name "Shaphan" is attested in a bullae were discovered during the excavations at the City of David headed by Israeli archeologist Yigal Shiloh in the layer of destruction by the Babylonians in ca. 586 BCE, with the inscription belonging to Gemaryahu ben Shaphan, identified with "Gemariah the son of Shaphan the scribe" (Jeremiah 36:10), although it is equally possible that there is no connection between the names found on the bullae and the person mentioned in the Bible.

== See also ==
- Ahikam the son of Shaphan
- Elnathan the son of Achbor
- Egypt
- Hezekiah
- Jehoiakim
- Jeremiah
- Jerusalem
- Josiah
- Judah
- Kirjath Jearim
- Micah of Moresheth
- Shiloh
- Urijah the son of Shemaiah
- Zion
- Related Bible parts: 2 Kings 22; 2 Chronicles 34; Micah 1, Micah 3

== Bibliography ==
- Ulrich, Eugene, ed. (2010). The Biblical Qumran Scrolls: Transcriptions and Textual Variants. Brill.
- Würthwein, Ernst (1995). The Text of the Old Testament. Translated by Rhodes, Erroll F. Grand Rapids, MI: Wm. B. Eerdmans. ISBN 978-0-8028-0788-5.
