= Jeremiah 36 =

Book of Jeremiah, chapter 36

- ← chapter 35 chapter 37 →
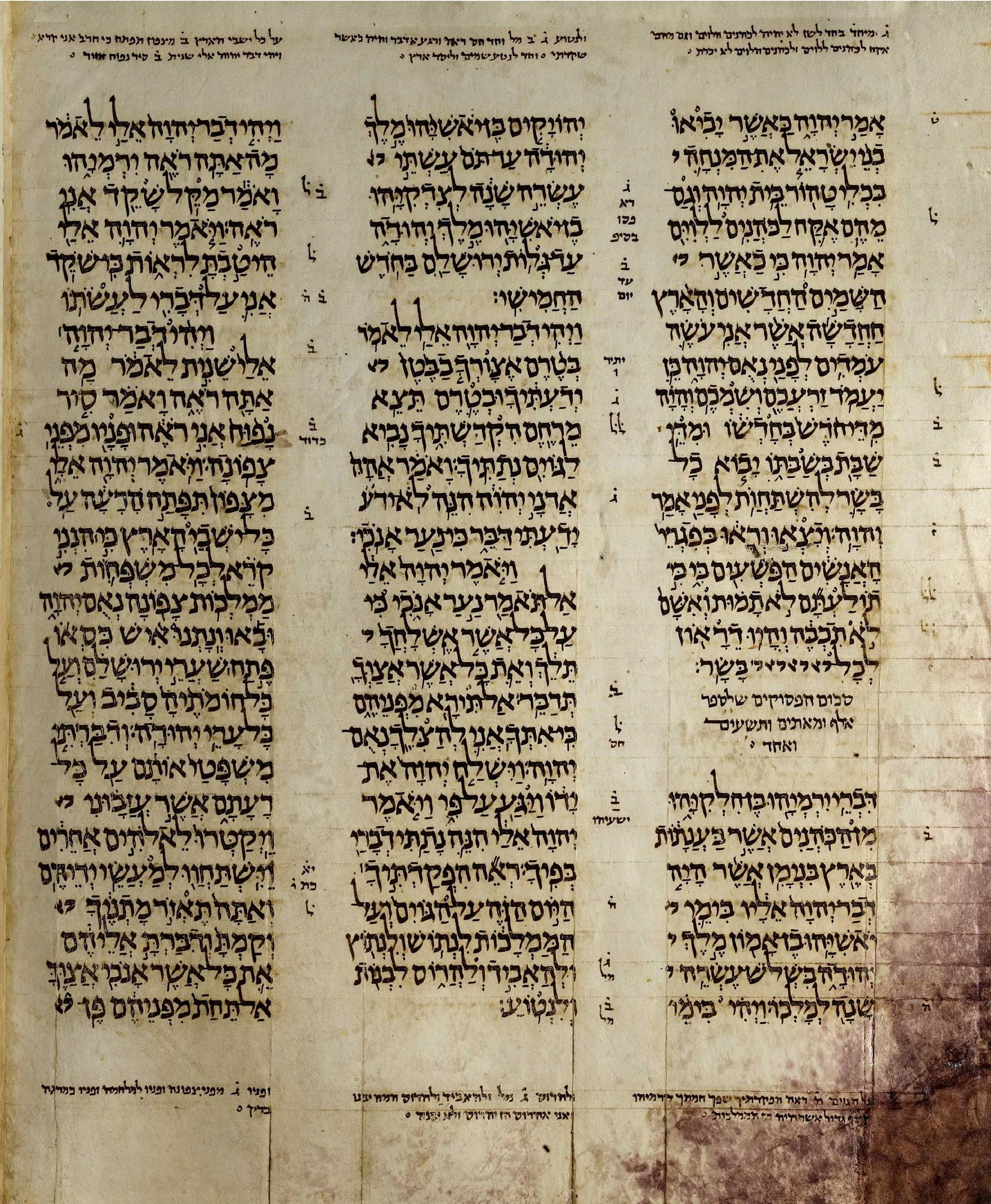
- A high resolution scan of the Aleppo Codex showing the Book of Jeremiah (the sixth book in Nevi'im).
- Book: Book of Jeremiah
- Hebrew Bible part: Nevi'im
- Order in the Hebrew part: 6
- Category: Latter Prophets
- Christian Bible part: Old Testament
- Order in the Christian part: 24

Jeremiah 36 is the thirty-sixth chapter of the Book of Jeremiah in the Hebrew Bible or the Old Testament of the Christian Bible. It is numbered as Jeremiah 43 in the Septuagint. This book contains prophecies attributed to the prophet Jeremiah, and is one of the Books of the Prophets. This chapter records the burning of a scroll of Jeremiah's prophecy by King Jehoiakim and the creation of another scroll by Baruch the scribe, acting on Jeremiah's instructions.

== Text ==
The original text was written in Hebrew. This chapter is divided into 32 verses. Some scholars see a literary parallel with 2 Kings 22, contrasting the reactions of Josiah (tearing his clothes when hearing the reading of the scroll of God's word) and Jehoiakim (tearing Jeremiah's scroll, as an "act of defiance" against God).

=== Textual witnesses ===
Some early manuscripts containing the text of this chapter in Hebrew are of the Masoretic Text tradition, which includes the Codex Cairensis (895), the Petersburg Codex of the Prophets (916), Aleppo Codex (10th century), Codex Leningradensis (1008).

There is also a translation into Koine Greek known as the Septuagint (with a different chapter and verse numbering), made in the last few centuries BCE. Extant ancient manuscripts of the Septuagint version include Codex Vaticanus (B; $\mathfrak{G}$^{B}; 4th century), Codex Sinaiticus (S; BHK: $\mathfrak{G}$^{S}; 4th century), Codex Alexandrinus (A; $\mathfrak{G}$^{A}; 5th century) and Codex Marchalianus (Q; $\mathfrak{G}$^{Q}; 6th century).

=== Verse numbering ===
The order of chapters and verses of the Book of Jeremiah in the English Bibles, Masoretic Text (Hebrew), and Vulgate (Latin), in some places differs from that in the Septuagint (LXX, the Greek Bible used in the Eastern Orthodox Church and others) according to Rahlfs or Brenton. The following table is taken with minor adjustments from Brenton's Septuagint, page 971.

The order of Computer Assisted Tools for Septuagint/Scriptural Study (CATSS) based on Alfred Rahlfs' Septuaginta (1935), differs in some details from Joseph Ziegler's critical edition (1957) in Göttingen LXX. Swete's Introduction mostly agrees with Rahlfs' edition (=CATSS).

Hebrew, Vulgate, English	Rahlfs' LXX (CATSS)
36:1-32	43:1-32
29:1-15,21-32	36:1-15,21-32

== Parashot ==
The parashah sections listed here are based on the Aleppo Codex. Jeremiah 36 is a part of the "Fifteenth prophecy (Jeremiah 36-39)" in the section of Prophecies interwoven with narratives about the prophet's life (Jeremiah 26-45). {P}: open parashah; {S}: closed parashah.

{P} 36:1-3 {S} 36:4-8 {P} 36:9-18 {S} 36:19-26 {S} 36:27-29 {S} 36:30-32 {P}

== Jehoiakim burns Jeremiah's scroll (36:1–26) ==
=== Verse 1 ===
In the fourth year of Jehoiakim son of Josiah, king of Judah, this word came to Jeremiah from the LORD:

- Cross reference: Jeremiah 25:1
- This chapter (as well as chapter 35) is out of the chronological order of chapter 32-34 and 37-44, as it records the events during the fourth year of king Jehoiakim's reign (605/604 SM).

=== Verse 2 ===
[The Lord says to Jeremiah:] "Take a scroll of a book and write on it all the words that I have spoken to you against Israel, against Judah, and against all the nations, from the day I spoke to you, from the days of Josiah even to this day."

- "Scroll of a book" (KJV: "roll of a book"): from Hebrew: מְגִלַּת־סֵפֶר, megillat-sefer; according to R. Lansing Hicks, a theologian at Yale Divinity School, "the dimension and content of this 'roll of book' or 'scroll' has "received repeated attention", resulting in some efforts to reconstruct it, but "each of these efforts suffers by reason of its subjective approach."

=== Verse 5 ===
And Jeremiah commanded Baruch, saying, "I am confined, I cannot go into the house of the Lord."

The New International Version suggests instead:

... "I am restricted; I am not allowed to go to the Lord’s temple".

Theologian Albert Barnes states that Jeremiah may have been "hindered, perhaps through fear of Jehoiakim"; A. W. Streane suggests Jeremiah "was hindered from addressing the people by ceremonial uncleanness". Benjamin Blayney suggests that, as he has before been tried in front of the princes in Jeremiah 26, Jeremiah had been put under some restraint, perhaps forbidden to enter the precincts of the Temple".

=== Verse 9 ===
Now it came to pass in the fifth year of Jehoiakim the son of Josiah, king of Judah, in the ninth month, that they proclaimed a fast before the Lord to all the people in Jerusalem, and to all the people who came from the cities of Judah to Jerusalem.

- "The fifth year...the ninth month": December 604 BCE. The fast is related to the fall of Ashkelon on the Philistine territory by the Babylonia army (probably in November 604 BC), as recorded in the Nebuchadnezzar Chronicle, which must cause terror in Judah, because they have allied themselves with Egypt since the death of Josiah in 609 BCE.

=== Verse 10 ===
Then read Baruch in the book the words of Jeremiah in the house of the LORD, in the chamber of Gemariah the son of Shaphan the scribe, in the higher court, at the entry of the new gate of the LORD's house, in the ears of all the people.

- "Baruch" (ben Neriah): a scribe closely related to Jeremiah and the one transcribed Jeremiah's prophecies in the scrolls (Jeremiah 36:2). His brother, Seriah, is a minister of king Zedekiah (Jeremiah 32:12; 51:19). Bullae or seals belonging to Baruch and Seriah have been discovered.
- "Gemariah the son of Shaphan the scribe": Shaphan the scribe (here and in Jeremiah 29:3) is assumed to be the same person reading to king Josiah the Book of Law discovered by Hilkiah the priest (2 Kings 22:3, 10). This Gemariah is then the brother of Ahikam, who protected Jeremiah (Jeremiah 26:24) and the uncle of Gedaliah (Jeremiah 40:5), who treated Jeremiah favorably, therefore it is not peculiar that Gemariah allowed Baruch to use his room. In 1983 a bulla was discovered in the ruins of the City of David with the inscription "belonging to Gemariah, son of Saphan", presumably the same person as in this verse.

=== Verse 23 ===
And it happened, when Jehudi had read three or four columns, that the king cut it with the scribe’s knife and cast it into the fire that was on the hearth, until all the scroll was consumed in the fire that was on the hearth.

- "Columns" (most English Bibles) or "leaves" (KJV) or "columns of scroll" (NIV): translated from Hebrew word delet which has the "sense of a column of writing." This Hebrew word is a hapax legomenon in the Masoretic Text. Holladay notices from this verse that the scroll (KJV: "roll") containing Jeremiah's prophecies is thus "a fairly extensive collection, containing several multiples of three or four columns of writing." Hicks noted that many ancient Hebrew manuscripts found in Qumran Caves have 3 to 4 columns per sheet. For example, the Great Isaiah Scroll, 1QIs^{a}, consists of 17 sheets, 10 have 3 columns per sheet and 5 have 4 columns, whereas 1QIs^{b} has 4 columns per sheet uniformly, as well as some other manuscripts. As all ancient Hebrew manuscript sheets found to date are made of leather/vellum, instead of papyrus, it would be difficult to cut them - Sabda.org through with a "scribe's knife" (KJV: "penknife"). Therefore, Hicks concluded that the scroll was cut "sheet by sheet at the sutures", and that some sheets have 4 columns and the others 3, just like 1QIs^{a}. Additionally, Hicks studied the average number of lines per column and the average number of words per line in ancient Hebrew biblical manuscripts to estimate that the text in one of the columns of writing described in this verse would contain "a little bit more than one Masoretic chapter of Jeremiah," as his examples show variations between 1.25 and 1.75 chapter per column. Furthermore, with the data of the height-to-width ratio of a column (i.e., 2:1 in his study) and the interpretation of the grammar of the verbal sequence in the same verse, Hicks comes to an estimate that the scroll destroyed in the presence of king Jehoiakim "would have contained between 18-24 chapters of our Masoretic book of Jeremiah," which may form the major parts of the first 25 chapters in the current Masoretic version of the book.

=== Verse 26 ===
Then the king commanded Jerahmeel the king’s son, Seraiah son of Azriel, and Shelemiah son of Abdeel to seize Baruch the scribe and Jeremiah the prophet, but the Lord had hidden them.

- "Jerahmeel the king's son" (KJV: "Jerahmeel the son of Hammelech"): an old bulla with the inscription "Jerahmeel the king's son" has been found and considered authentic.

== Baruch and Jeremiah write another scroll (36:27–32) ==
=== Verse 30 ===
Therefore thus says the Lord concerning Jehoiakim king of Judah: He shall have none to sit on the throne of David, and his dead body shall be cast out to the heat by day and the frost by night.

Jehoiakim's rejection to the words in the scroll results in the tragic end of the monarchy and his own life.

=== Verse 32 ===
Then Jeremiah took another scroll and gave it to Baruch the scribe, the son of Neriah, who wrote on it at the instruction of Jeremiah all the words of the book which Jehoiakim king of Judah had burned in the fire. And besides, there were added to them many similar words.

Jeremiah used the destruction of the first scroll (KJV: "roll") as a symbol for Jehoiakim's later death (Jeremiah 22:18–19; 2 Kings 24:6–15) and asked Baruch to wrote another roll with expanded contents of the first one.

- "At the instruction of Jeremiah": or "from the mouth of Jeremiah".

== See also ==
- Babylon
- Baruch ben Neriah
- David
- Delaiah the son of Shemaiah
- Elishama the scribe
- Elnathan the son of Achbor
- Gemariah the son of Shaphan the scribe
- Jehoiakim
- Jehudi the son of Nethaniah, the son of Shelemiah, the son of Cushi
- Jerusalem
- Josiah
- Judah
- Michaiah the son of Gemariah, the son of Shaphan
- Seraiah the son of Azriel
- Shelemiah the son of Abdeel
- Zedekiah the son of Hananiah
- Related Bible part: 2 Kings 22, Jeremiah 25, Jeremiah 26, Jeremiah 29

== Sources ==
- Hicks, R. Lansing (1983). "Delet and Megillāh: A Fresh Approach to Jeremiah XXXVI". Vetus Testamentum. 33 (1): 46–66. doi:10.2307/1517993. JSTOR 1517993.
- Huey, F. B. (1993). The New American Commentary - Jeremiah, Lamentations: An Exegetical and Theological Exposition of Holy Scripture, NIV Text. B&H Publishing Group. ISBN 9780805401165.
- O'Connor, Kathleen M. (2007). "23. Jeremiah". In Barton, John; Muddiman, John (eds.). The Oxford Bible Commentary (first (paperback) ed.). Oxford University Press. pp. 487–533. ISBN 978-0199277186.
- Ryle, Herbert Edward (2009). The Cambridge Bible for Schools and Colleges Paperback. BiblioBazaar. ISBN 9781117708690.
- Würthwein, Ernst (1995). The Text of the Old Testament. Translated by Rhodes, Erroll F. Grand Rapids, MI: Wm. B. Eerdmans. ISBN 0-8028-0788-7.
