= Abdeel (biblical figure) =

Abdeel (Hebrew: עַבְדְּאֵל, lit. 'servant [of] God'; akin to the Arabic عبد الله, Abdullah) is mentioned in Jeremiah 36:26 as the father of Shelemiah, one of three men who were commanded by King Jehoiakim to seize the prophet Jeremiah and his secretary, Baruch ben Neriah. The Septuagint omits the phrase "and Shelemiah son of Abdeel"—probably a scribal error due to homoioteleuton.
