= Shallum =

Wikimedia disambiguation page

Shallum ("retribution") was the name of several people of the Old Testament.

== Shallum of Israel ==
King of Israel.

== Alternative name of Jehoahaz ==
King of Judah

== Son of Tikvah ==
Keeper of the temple-wardrobe in the reign of Josiah (2 Kings 22:14) and husband of Huldah the prophetess.

== One of the posterity of Judah ==
(1 Chronicles 2:40, 41).

== A descendant of Simeon ==
(1 Chr. 4:25).

== A descendant of Levi ==
One of the line of the high priests (1 Chr. 6:13).

Israelite religious titles
Preceded by Zadok (According to 1 Chronicles 6:12); Odeas (According to Josephus); Hoshaiah (According to the Seder 'Olam Zutta)	High Priest of Israel	Succeeded by Hilkiah

== One of the sons of Naphtali ==
(1 Chr. 7:13).

== A gatekeeper who lived in Jerusalem ==
(1 Chr. 9:17)

== A Levite porter ==
(1 Chr. 9:19, 31; Jeremiah 35:4).

== The uncle of the prophet Jeremiah ==
(Jer. 32:7).

== Son of Hallohesh ==
Ruler of a half-district of Jerusalem, repaired a section of the wall of Jerusalem with the help of his daughters (Nehemiah 3:12).

== Ancestor of Ezra ==
(Ezra 7:2). Also transliterated as Salemas (2 Esdras 1:1), Salem (1 Esdras 8:1) and (in the King James Bible) Sadamias.
