= List of people named Shemaiah in the Bible =

Shemaiah is the name of several people in the Hebrew Bible (Hebrew: שמעיה shemayah "God Heard"):

- a Levite in the time of David, who with 200 of his relatives took part in the bringing up of the ark from Obed-edom to Hebron (I Chronicles 15:8)
- the eldest son of Obed-edom (I Chronicles 26:4-8)
- Shemaiah son of Nethanel, a scribe mentioned as active at the death of David (I Chronicles 24:6)
- Shemaiah, a prophet in the reign of Rehoboam (I Kings 12:22-24; II Chronicles 11:2-4; 12:5)
- one of the Levites whom Jehoshaphat appointed to teach the law (II Chronicles 17:8)
- Shemaiah, the father of Shimri, listed as a Simeonite five generations before the reign of Hezekiah (I Chronicles 4:37)
- Shemaiah son of Jeduthun, a Levite in the time of Hezekiah (II Chronicles 29:14)
- a Levite appointed to "distribute the oblations of the Lord" during the reign of Hezekiah (II Chronicles 31:15)
- a Levite in the time of Josiah (II Chronicles 35:9)
- the father of Urijah the prophet (Jeremiah 26:20)
- the father of a prince in the reign of Jehoiakim (Jeremiah 36:12)
- Shemaiah the Nehelamite, a false prophet who went with the captives to Babylon and who opposed Jeremiah (Jeremiah 29:24, 31-32).
- Shemaiah son of Galal, a Levite listed as the father of a man living in the city of Jerusalem after the end of the Babylonian captivity (I Chronicles 9:16)
- Shemaiah son of Shechaniah, listed among those who made repairs to the wall of Jerusalem in Nehemiah 3:29
- Shemaiah son of Delaiah, a false prophet who hindered the rebuilding of Jerusalem (Nehemiah 6:10)
- a priest involved in the dedication of the wall of Jerusalem (Nehemiah 12:42)
- Shemaiah the son of Hasshub, a Levite listed as living in the city of Jerusalem after the end of the Babylonian captivity (I Chronicles 9:14; Nehemiah 11:15)
- a prince of Judah who assisted at the dedication of the wall of Jerusalem (Nehemiah 12:34-36)
- A Son of Joel, Father of Gog

The second book of Chronicles refers to a "Book of the Prophet Shemaiah". No existing work has been identified with this title (see Lost books of the Old Testament).

== See also ==
- Shema (disambiguation)
- Shemaiah (disambiguation)
- List of minor biblical figures, L–Z#S
