= Achbor =

Hebrew name

Achbor (Hebrew: עַכְבּוֹר ʿAḵbōr) is a name that means "gnawing" and is, by extension, used as the word for "mouse". There are at least two persons by this name in the Hebrew Bible.

== Achbor of Edom ==
In the King Lists in the books of Genesis and 1 Chronicles Achbor is the father of Baal-hanan, a king of Edom, but is not actually listed as being king himself although some commentaries assume that he was. See Genesis 36:38; 1 Chronicles 1:49.

== Achbor of Judah ==
In the Books of Kings Achbor, son of Michaiah, is one of Josiah's officers, and one of the five men sent to the prophetess Huldah to inquire regarding the book of the law newly discovered in the Temple in Jerusalem (2 Kings 22:12, 14). This Achbor is also called Abdon (2 Chronicles 34:20).

This may be the same Achbor who is mentioned as the father of Elnathan in the Book of Jeremiah 26:20–23, and who lived in the reign of King Jehoiakim of Judah.
