= Jeremiah 29 =

Book of Jeremiah, chapter 29

- ← chapter 28 chapter 30 →
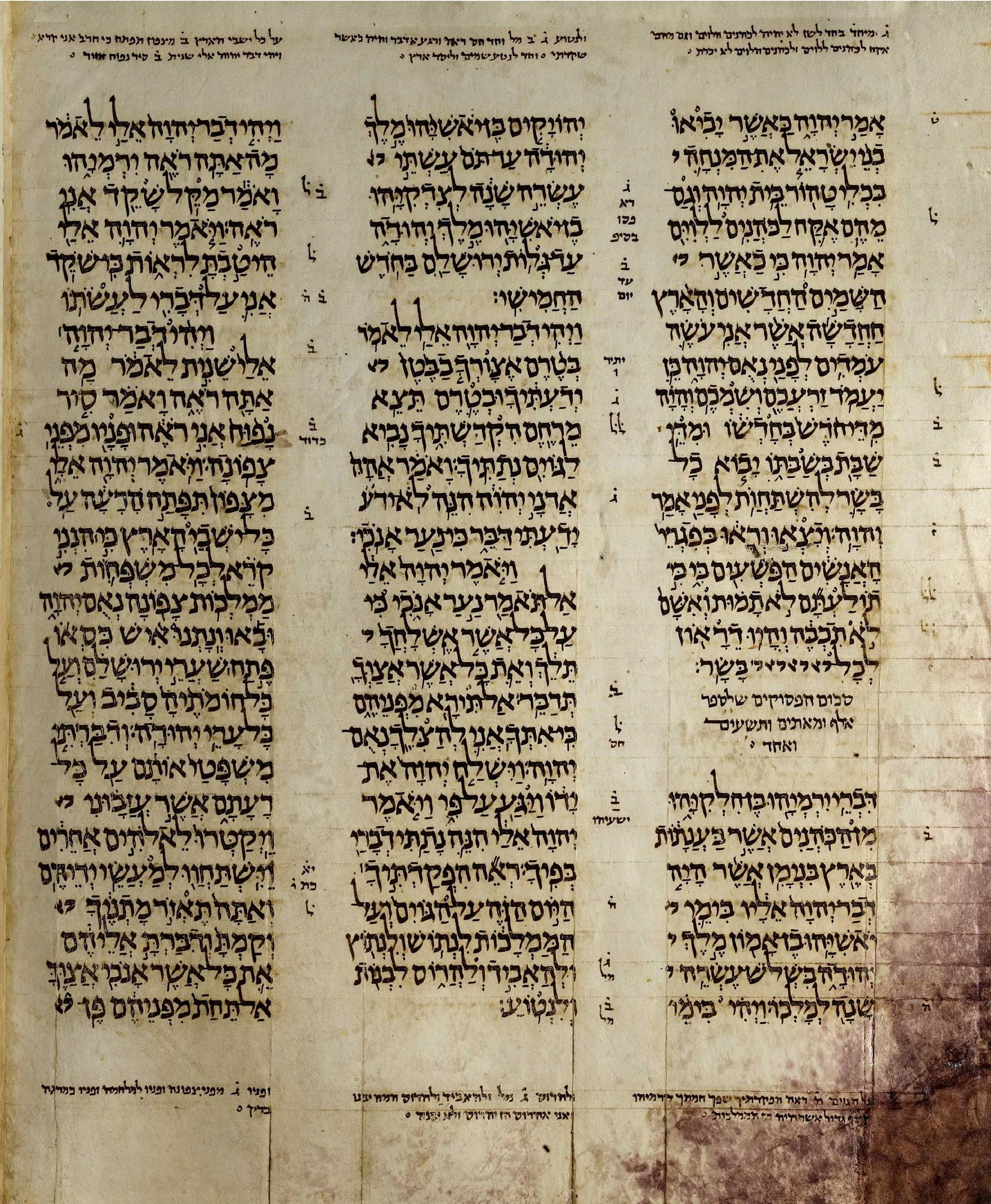
- A high resolution scan of the Aleppo Codex showing the Book of Jeremiah (the sixth book in Nevi'im).
- Book: Book of Jeremiah
- Hebrew Bible part: Nevi'im
- Order in the Hebrew part: 6
- Category: Latter Prophets
- Christian Bible part: Old Testament
- Order in the Christian part: 24

Jeremiah 29 is the twenty-ninth chapter of the Book of Jeremiah in the Hebrew Bible or the Old Testament of the Christian Bible. It is numbered as Jeremiah 36 in the Septuagint. This book compiles prophecies attributed to the prophet Jeremiah, and is one of the Books of the Prophets. This chapter records several "letters reported by the third-person narrator": from Jerusalem, Jeremiah sent a letter to the people in the Babylonia exile (verses 1-23) and he responded to a letter about him from Shemaiah (verses 24–32).

== Text ==
The original text of this chapter, as with the rest of the Book of Jeremiah, was written in Hebrew language. Since the division of the Bible into chapters and verses in the late medieval period, this chapter is divided into 32 verses.

=== Textual witnesses ===
Some early manuscripts containing the text of this chapter in Hebrew are of the Masoretic Text tradition, which includes the Codex Cairensis (895), the Petersburg Codex of the Prophets (916), Aleppo Codex (10th century (Note: Since 1947 only parts containing verses 1-9 are extant)), Codex Leningradensis (1008).

There is also a translation into Koine Greek known as the Septuagint (with a different chapter and verse numbering), made in the last few centuries BCE. Extant ancient manuscripts of the Septuagint version include Codex Vaticanus (B; $\mathfrak{G}$^{B}; 4th century), Codex Sinaiticus (S; BHK: $\mathfrak{G}$^{S}; 4th century), Codex Alexandrinus (A; $\mathfrak{G}$^{A}; 5th century) and Codex Marchalianus (Q; $\mathfrak{G}$^{Q}; 6th century). The Septuagint version doesn't contain a part what is generally known to be verses 16–20 in Christian Bibles.

=== Verse numbering ===
The order of chapters and verses of the Book of Jeremiah in the English Bibles, Masoretic Text (Hebrew), and Vulgate (Latin), in some places differs from that in Septuagint (LXX, the Greek Bible used in the Eastern Orthodox Church and others) according to Rahlfs or Brenton. The following table is taken with minor adjustments from Brenton's Septuagint, page 971.

The order of Computer Assisted Tools for Septuagint/Scriptural Study (CATSS) based on Alfred Rahlfs' Septuaginta (1935), differs in some details from Joseph Ziegler's critical edition (1957) in Göttingen LXX. Swete's Introduction mostly agrees with Rahlfs' edition (=CATSS).

Hebrew, Vulgate, English	Rahlfs' LXX (CATSS)	Brenton's LXX
29:1-15, 21-32	36:1-15,21-32	
29:16-20	none	
47:1-7	29:1-7	
49:7-22	none	29:7b-22

== Parashot ==
The parashah sections listed here are based on the Aleppo Codex, and those in the missing parts of the codex (since 1947) are from Kimhi's notes, marked with an asterisk (*). Jeremiah 29 is a part of the Tenth prophecy (Jeremiah 26-29) in the section of Prophecies interwoven with narratives about the prophet's life (26-45). {P}: open parashah; {S}: closed parashah.

{P} 29:1-9 {P*} 29:10-15 {S*} 29:16 {S*} 29:17-20 {P*} 29:21-23 {S*} 29:24-29 {P*} 29:30-32 {P*}

== Jeremiah's letter to the exiles (29:1–23) ==
=== Verse 2 ===
(This happened after Jeconiah the king, the queen mother, the eunuchs, the princes of Judah and Jerusalem, the craftsmen, and the smiths had departed from Jerusalem.)

The passage in parentheses provides the background from 2 Kings 24:8–16 about the deportation of king Jeconiah and many prominent leaders and skilled persons in 597 BC from Judah to Babylon, which is a method learned from the Assyrians to reduce the possibility of rebellion. The letters were sent to counter the false prophecies or baseless assurance of speedy return from exile (Jeremiah 27).

"The queen mother": Emil Hirsch and Victor Ryssel, in the 1906 Jewish Encyclopedia, suggested that the mention of the king's mother "on equal terms" indicates a "youthful Jeconiah".

=== Verse 3 ===
The letter was sent by the hand of Elasah the son of Shaphan, and Gemariah the son of Hilkiah, whom Zedekiah king of Judah sent to Babylon, to Nebuchadnezzar king of Babylon, saying,

- "Elasah the son of Shaphan" is likely a brother of Ahikam who is symphatetic to Jeremiah (Jeremiah 26:24).

=== Verse 10 ===
For thus saith the LORD,

That after seventy years be accomplished at Babylon I will visit you, and perform my good word toward you, in causing you to return to this place.

- Cross reference: Jeremiah 25:12, Daniel 9:2; Zechariah 1:12; Zechariah 7:5
- "Seventy years": Circa 605-536 BCE. The announcement of the Judah's punishment at the hand of foreign nations must have puzzled Jeremiah's audience, as also become the subject of questions by Habakkuk (Habakkuk 1:12–17), but Jeremiah 25:12 is to put it to rest by stating that after God have used Babylon to punish His people, He would punish Babylon for its sins.

=== Verse 11 ===
For I know the plans that I have for you, says the Lord,

plans for peace and not for evil, to give you a future and a hope.

- "Says the Lord" from Hebrew נאם־יהוה, nə-’um-YHWH, "Oracle of the Lord."

== Message to Shemaiah (29:24–32) ==
=== Verse 26 ===
The LORD hath made thee priest in the stead of Jehoiada the priest, that ye should be officers in the house of the LORD, for every man that is mad, and maketh himself a prophet, that thou shouldest put him in prison, and in the stocks.

Jeremiah's advice for the people in the Babylonian exile to "settle there quietly" caused one of them to send a letter to the high priest in Jerusalem criticizing him for not doing his tasks properly, allowing everyone to be a mad man, who "maketh himself a prophet", specifically directing to put Jeremiah "in prison and in the stocks".

== See also ==
- Ahab the son of Kolaiah
- Babylon
- Elasah the son of Shaphan
- Gemariah the son of Hilkiah
- Israel
- Jeconiah
- Jehoiada the priest
- Jerusalem
- Nebuchadnezzar
- Judah
- Shemaiah the Nehelamite
- Zedekiah, the king of Judah
- Zedekiah the son of Maaseiah
- Zephaniah the son of Maaseiah
- Related Bible parts: 2 Chronicles 36, Ezra 1, Jeremiah 25, Daniel 1, Daniel 9, Daniel 10, Zechariah 1, Zechariah 7.

== Bibliography ==
- Huey, F. B. (1993). The New American Commentary - Jeremiah, Lamentations: An Exegetical and Theological Exposition of Holy Scripture, NIV Text. B&H Publishing Group. ISBN 9780805401165.
- Ofer, Yosef (1992). "The Aleppo Codex and the Bible of R. Shalom Shachna Yellin" in Rabbi Mordechai Breuer Festschrift: Collected Papers in Jewish Studies, ed. M. Bar-Asher, 1:295-353. Jerusalem (in Hebrew). Online text (PDF)
- Thompson, J. A. (1980). A Book of Jeremiah. The New International Commentary on the Old Testament (illustrated, revised ed.). Wm. B. Eerdmans Publishing. ISBN 9780802825308.
- Würthwein, Ernst (1995). The Text of the Old Testament. Translated by Rhodes, Erroll F. Grand Rapids, MI: Wm. B. Eerdmans. ISBN 0-8028-0788-7.
