= Asaiah =

Asaiah (Hebrew: עשיה "God made me") was the personal secretary of Josiah, king of Judah in the 7th century BCE, and according to the Bible (II Kings, Chapter 22, and Books of Chronicles 2, Chapter 34), is one of Josiah's deputation to the prophet Huldah. A seal with the text Asayahu servant of the king probably belonged to him. Another seal possibly referencing him, found by the Temple Mount Sifting Project, reads "belonging to Yed[a‛]yah (son of) Asayahu".

== Other biblical figures ==
- Asaiah (Simeonite) a prince of the tribe of Simeon who attacked and captured Gedor, and settled there (I Chron. iv. 36)
- Asaiah (Levite) a Levite appointed to take part in bringing back the Ark of the Covenant (I Chron. vi. 15 [A. V. 30]; xv. 6, 11)
- Asaiah (Shilonite) a Shilonite residing in Jerusalem (I Chron. ix. 5) identical with Maaseiah (Neh. xi. 5)

== See also ==
- Asaiah Ziv

== Sources ==
- Hallo, William W., ed. (1997–2002). The Context of Scripture. Brill. ISBN 9789004131057. OCLC 902087326. (3 Volumes)
