= Ahikam =

Hebrew Bible character

Ahikam (Hebrew: אחיקם, "My brother has risen") was one of the five whom, according to the Hebrew Bible, Josiah sent to consult the prophetess Huldah in connection with the discovery of the book of the law.

== Biblical accounts ==
He was the son of Shaphan, the royal secretary, and the father of Gedaliah, governor of Judea after the destruction of Jerusalem by the Babylonians.

On one occasion, in a move described by Jonathan Magonet as taking the prophet into 'protective custody', he protected Jeremiah against the fury of Jehoiakim (Jeremiah 26:24) It was in the chamber of another son (Gemariah) of Shaphan that Baruch read Jeremiah's scroll in the hearing of all the people.
