= Huldah =

Biblical character

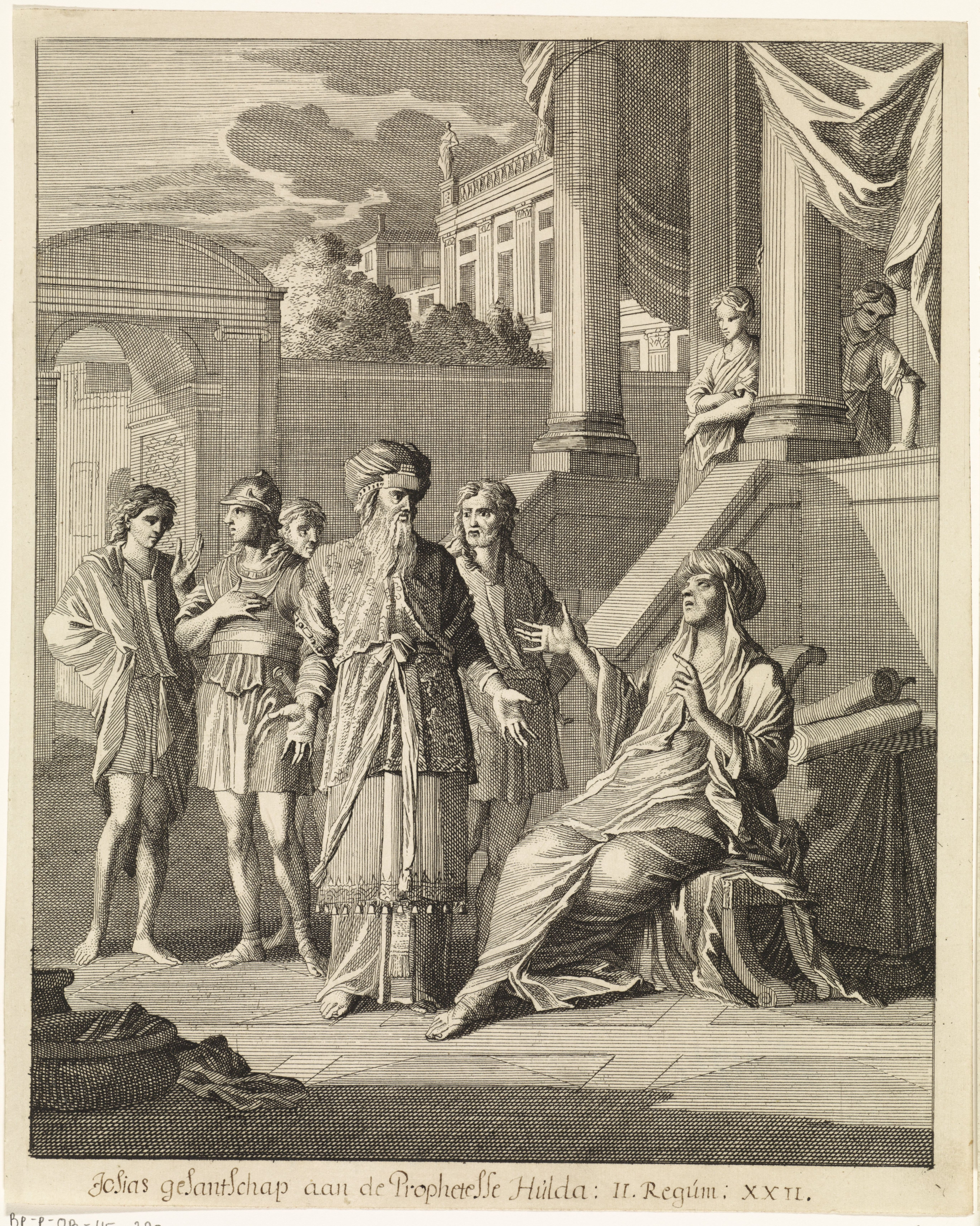
Huldah prophesies the destruction of Jerusalem. Print by Caspar Luyken, 1708.

Huldah (Hebrew: חֻלְדָּה Ḥuldā) is a prophetess mentioned in the Hebrew Bible in 2 Kings 22:14–20 and 2 Chronicles 34:22–28. After the discovery of a book of the Law during renovations at Solomon's Temple, on the order of King Josiah, Hilkiah together with Ahikam, Acbor, Shaphan and Asaiah approach her to seek the Lord's opinion.

She was the wife of Shallum son of Tokhath (also called Tikvah), son of Harhas (also called Hasrah), keeper of the wardrobe. She lived in Jerusalem, in the Second District or Second Quarter (Hebrew: במשנה, romanized: ba-mišneh, lit. 'in the second'). The King James Version of the Bible calls this quarter "the college", and the New International Version calls it "the new quarter".

According to Rabbinic interpretation, Huldah and Deborah were the principal professed female prophets in the Nevi'im (Prophets) portion of the Hebrew Bible, although Miriam is referred to as such in the Torah and an unnamed prophet is mentioned in Isaiah. "Huldah" derives from the Hebrew lemma חלד (Ḥ-L-D), meaning to abide or to continue.

The Huldah Gates in the Southern Wall of the Temple Mount are named for her.

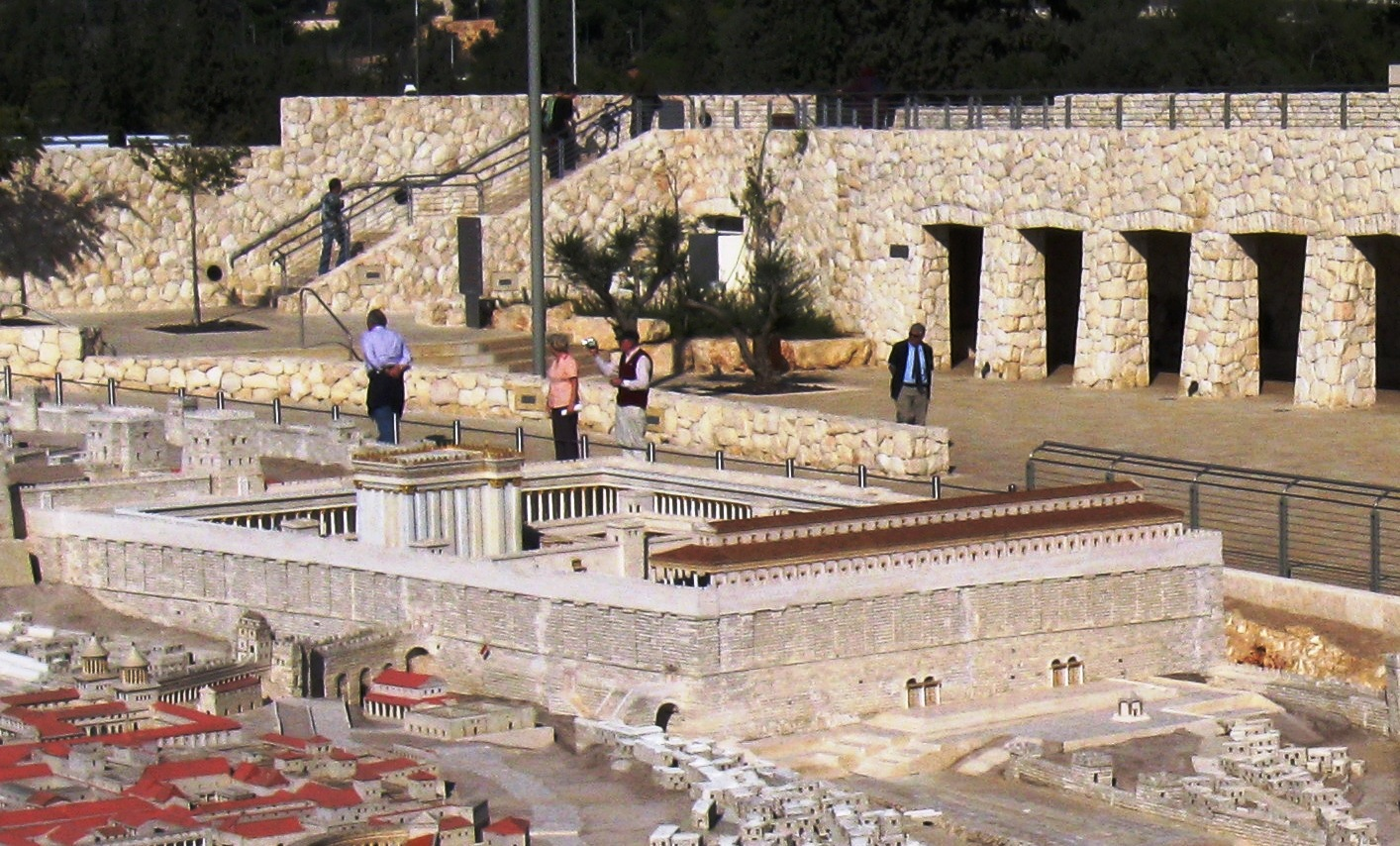
Holyland Model of Jerusalem, to the south of the Temple Mount, a pyramidal building represents the supposed tomb of the prophet Huldah. However, archaeological excavations have shown that there was no tomb there.

== In the Bible ==
The account in 2 Kings 22 recounts the consulting of Huldah as follows:

He gave these orders to Hilkiah the priest, Ahikam son of Shaphan, Akbor son of Micaiah, Shaphan the secretary, and Asaiah the king's attendant: "Go and inquire of the Lord for me and the people and all Judah about what is written in this book that has been found. Great is the Lord's anger that burns against us because those who have gone before us have not obeyed the words of this book; they have not acted by all that is written there concerning us."

Hilkiah the priest, Ahikam, Akbor, Shaphan, and Asaiah went to speak to the prophet Huldah, who was the wife of Shallum son of Tikvah, the son of Harhas, keeper of the wardrobe. She lived in Jerusalem, in the New Quarter.

She said to them, "This is what the Lord, the God of Israel, says: Tell the man who sent you to me, 'This is what the Lord says: I am going to bring disaster on this place and its people, according to everything written in the book the king of Judah has read.'"

After authenticating the book and prophesying a future of destruction for failure to follow it, Huldah concludes by reassuring King Josiah that due to his piety, God has heard his prayer and "thou shalt be gathered unto thy grave in peace, neither shall thy eyes see all the evil which I shall bring upon this place".

Huldah's prophetic oracle identifies the words the King of Judah heard (2 Kings 22:18) with what Yahweh had spoken (2 Kings 22:19). According to William E. Phipps, Huldah is the first person to declare certain writings to be Holy Scripture.

Huldah appears in the Hebrew Bible only in nine verses, 2 Kings 22:13–20, 2 Chronicles 34:22–28. This short narrative is sufficient to make clear that Huldah was regarded as a prophet accustomed to speaking the word of God directly to high priests and royal officials, to whom high officials came in supplication, who told kings and nations of their fates, who had the authority to determine what was and was not the genuine Law, and who spoke in a manner of stern command when acting as a prophet. Nonetheless, the Bible does not offer the sort of background information it typically does with other pivotal prophets. Indeed, we are left knowing more about her husband's background than we know of hers, and the little information we know of her personality is largely about her husband.

== In rabbinic literature ==
According to Rabbinic interpretation, Huldah said to the messengers of King Josiah, "Tell the man that sent you to me ..." (2 Kings 22:15), indicating by her unceremonious language that as far as she was concerned, Josiah was like any other man. The king addressed her, and not Jeremiah because he believed that women are more easily stirred to pity than men and that therefore she would be more likely than would Jeremiah to intercede with God on his behalf (Meg. 14a, b; comp. Seder 'Olam R. xxi.). Huldah was a relative of Jeremiah, both being descendants of Rahab by her marriage with Joshua (Sifre, Num. 78; Meg. 14a, b). While Jeremiah admonished and preached repentance to the men, Huldah did the same to the women (Pesiḳ. R. 26 [ed. Friedmann, p. 129]). Huldah was not only a prophet but taught publicly in the school (Targum to 2 Kings 22:14), according to some teaching, especially the oral doctrine.

== Burial site ==
Two conflicting traditions exist regarding the final resting place of Huldah. The Tosefta records Huldah's burial site as between the walls of Jerusalem. During the Middle Ages, a second tradition developed identifying Huldah's burial site with a cave carved out of the rock beneath a mosque on the Mount of Olives (see Chapel of the Ascension, Jerusalem). In Christianity and Islam, the burial is associated with two different holy women from those respective religions (Saint Pelagia and Rabia Basri respectively).
