= Uriah (prophet) =

Biblical prophet, son of Shemaiah

Uriah (Note: Also known as "Urijah" 'The lord is my light' Hebrew: אוּרִיָּה Arabic:أوريا) (or Urijah in some older English translations) is a prophet and martyr mentioned in the Book of Jeremiah.

== Biblical narrative ==
He is described as being the son of Shemaiah from Kiriath-Jearim. During the reign of Jehoiakim, king of Judah, he fled into Egypt from the cruelty of the king, but having been brought back he was beheaded and his body "cast into the graves of the common people." His life shows one possible consequence of giving biblical prophecy. He spoke the same message as Jeremiah did but unlike Jeremiah he ended up being killed. There is some discussion as to why one was killed and the other was not.

== In Islam ==
In Islam, Uryā ibn Shamāyā (Arabic: أوريا ابن شمايا) has no mention in the Quran nor Hadith. Some people consider him to be an unmentioned prophet.

== Lachish Letters ==
While it is not certain, there is a scholarly opinion that Uriah might be referenced in the Lachish letters. See Lachish letters.
