= Gedaliah =

Biblical character

Gedaliah (/ɡɛdəˈlaɪ.ə/ or /ɡɪˈdɑːliə/; גְּדַלְיָּה Gəḏalyyā) was a person from the Bible who was a governor of Yehud province. He was also the son of Ahikam, who saved the prophet Jeremiah.

== Names ==
Gedaliah (/ɡɛdəˈlaɪ.ə/ or /ɡɪˈdɑːliə/; Hebrew: גְּדַלְיָּה Gəḏalyyā or גְּדַלְיָהוּ Gəḏalyyāhū; also written Gedalia, Gedallah, Gedalya, or Gedalyah) means "Yah(weh) is Great".

== Background ==
Gedaliah was the son of Ahikam (who saved the life of the prophet Jeremiah) and the grandson of Shaphan (who is mentioned in relation to the discovery of the scroll of Teaching that some scholars identify as the core of the book of Deuteronomy).

== Governorship ==
According to the Hebrew Bible's Book of Jeremiah and Second Book of Kings, Gedaliah was appointed by Nebuchadnezzar II of Babylon as governor of Yehud province, which was formed after the defeat of the Kingdom of Judah and the destruction of Jerusalem, in a part of the territory that previously formed the kingdom. He was supported by a Chaldean guard stationed at Mizpah. On hearing of the appointment, the Jews that had taken refuge in surrounding countries returned to Judah.

He began to zealously encourage the people to cultivate the fields and vineyards, and thus to lay the foundation of security. Many who had fled to neighboring lands during the war of destruction were attracted by the news of the revival of the community. They came to Gedaliah in Mizpah, and he warmly welcomed them.

== Assassination ==
Ishmael son of Nethaniah, and the ten men who were with him, murdered Gedaliah, together with most of the Jews who had joined him and many Babylonians whom Nebuchadnezzar had left with Gedaliah (Jeremiah 41:2–3). The remaining Judeans feared the vengeance of Nebuchadnezzar and fled to Egypt. Although the dates are not clear from the Bible, this probably happened about 582/1 BC (Jeremiah 52:30), some four to five years and three months after the destruction of Jerusalem and the First Temple in 586 BC.

== Fast of Gedaliah ==
To lament the assassination of Gedaliah, which left Judah devoid of Jewish rule after the destruction of the First Temple, the Jewish Sages established the third day of Tishrei as the Fast of Gedaliah. Although Gedaliah's assassination perhaps occurred on the first day of Tishrei, the fast is observed on the third day so as not to coincide with Rosh Hashanah.

== Archaeology ==
A seal impression, dating to 587–586 BCE and discovered at the ancient site of Tel Lachish in 1935, reads "Gedaliah who is over the house" and is commonly identified with Gedaliah, son of Ahikam.
