= Jehoiakim =

18th king of Judah

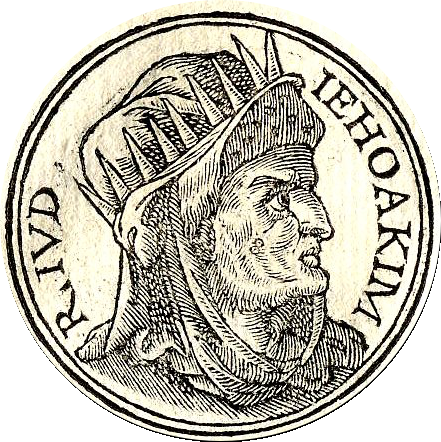
- Jehoiakim from Guillaume Rouillé's Promptuarii Iconum Insigniorum, 1553

King of Judah
- Reign: 609–598 BC
- Predecessor: Jehoahaz
- Successor: Jehoiachin
- Born: Eliakim c. 632 BC; Jerusalem
- Died: 598 BC; Jerusalem
- Spouse: Nehushta
- Issue: Jehoiachin; Zedekiah
- House: House of David
- Father: Josiah
- Mother: Zebudah

Jehoiakim (Note: pronounced /dʒɪˈhɔɪ.əkɪm/; Hebrew: יְהוֹיָקִים Yəhōyāqīm "he whom Yahweh has risen up") (also sometimes spelled Jehoikim; (Note: Greek: Ιωακείμ; Latin: Joakim) c. 632 BC – 598 BC) was the eighteenth and third-from-last King of Judah from 609 to 598 BC. He was the second son of King Josiah (1 Chronicles 3:15) and Zebidah, the daughter of Pedaiah of Rumah. His birth name was Eliakim. (Note: Hebrew: אֶלְיָקִים ’Elyāqīm; Greek: Ελιακείμ; Latin: Eliakim)

== Background ==
After Josiah's death, Jehoiakim's younger brother Jehoahaz (also known as Shallum) was proclaimed king, but after three months Pharaoh Necho II deposed him, making Eliakim king in his place. When placed on the throne, his name was changed to "Jehoiakim".

Jehoiakim reigned for eleven years, until 598 BC and was succeeded by his son Jeconiah (also known as Jehoiachin), who reigned for only three months.

== Reign ==
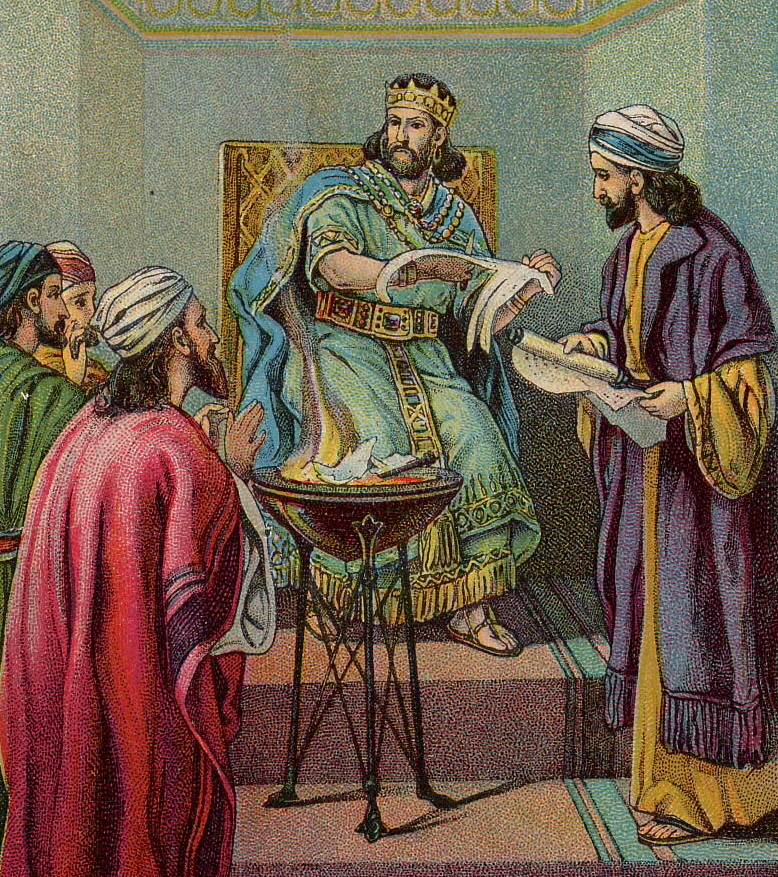
Jehoiakim burns Jeremiah's scroll; as in the Book of Jeremiah 36:21–32 (illustration from a Bible card published in 1904 by the Providence Lithograph Company).

Jehoiakim was appointed king by Necho II, king of Egypt, in 609 BC, after Necho's return from the battle in Harran, three months after he had killed King Josiah at Megiddo. Necho deposed Jehoiakim's younger brother Jehoahaz after a reign of only three months and took him to Egypt, where he died. Jehoiakim ruled originally as a vassal of the Egyptians, paying a heavy tribute. To raise the money he "taxed the land and exacted the silver and gold from the people of the land according to their assessments."

However, after the Egyptians were defeated by the Babylonians at the battle of Carchemish in 605 BC, Nebuchadnezzar II besieged Jerusalem, and Jehoiakim changed allegiances to avoid the destruction of Jerusalem. He paid tribute from the treasury in Jerusalem, some temple artifacts, and handed over some of the royal family and nobility as hostages. In the Book of Daniel, Daniel is described as being one of these.

Rabbinical literature describes Jehoiakim as a godless tyrant who committed atrocious sins and crimes. He is portrayed as living in incestuous relations with his mother, daughter-in-law, and stepmother, and was in the habit of murdering men, whose wives he then violated and whose property he seized. He also had tattooed his body.

The prophet Jeremiah criticised the king's policies, insisting on repentance and strict adherence to the law. Another prophet, Uriah ben Shemaiah, proclaimed a similar message and Jehoiakim ordered his execution (Jeremiah 26:20–23).

Jehoiakim continued for three years as a vassal to the Babylonians, until the failure of an invasion of Egypt in 601 BC undermined their control of the area. Jehoiakim switched allegiance back to the Egyptians. In late 598 BC, the Babylonian king Nebuchadnezzar II invaded Judah and again laid siege to Jerusalem, which lasted three months. Jehoiakim died before the siege ended. The Book of Chronicles records that "Nebuchadnezzar king of Babylon ... bound him in fetters, to carry him to Babylon." Jeremiah prophesied that he died without proper funeral, describing the people of Judah "shall not lament for him, saying, 'Alas, master!' or 'Alas, his glory!' He shall be buried with the burial of a donkey, dragged and cast out beyond the gates of Jerusalem" (Jeremiah 22:18–19) "and his dead body shall be cast out to the heat of the day and the frost of the night" (Jeremiah 36:30). Josephus writes that Nebuchadnezzar slew Jehoiakim along with high-ranking officers and then commanded Jehoiakim's body "to be thrown before the walls, without any burial."

He was succeeded by his son Jeconiah (also known as Jehoiachin). After three months, Nebuchadnezzar deposed Jeconiah (fearing that he would avenge his father's death by revolting, according to Josephus) and installed Zedekiah, Jehoiakim's younger brother, as king in his place. Jeconiah, his household, and much of Judah's population were exiled to Babylon.

According to the Babylonian Chronicles, Jerusalem fell on 2 Adar (16 March) 597 BC. The Chronicles state:

The seventh year (of Nebuchadnezzar – 598 BC.) in the month Chislev (Nov/Dec) the king of Babylon assembled his army, and after he had invaded the land of Hatti (Turkey/Syria) he laid siege to the city of Judah. On the second day of the month of Adar (16 March) he conquered the city and took the king (Jeconiah) prisoner. He installed in his place a king (Zedekiah) of his own choice, and after he had received rich tribute, he sent (them) forth to Babylon.

== In rabbinic literature ==
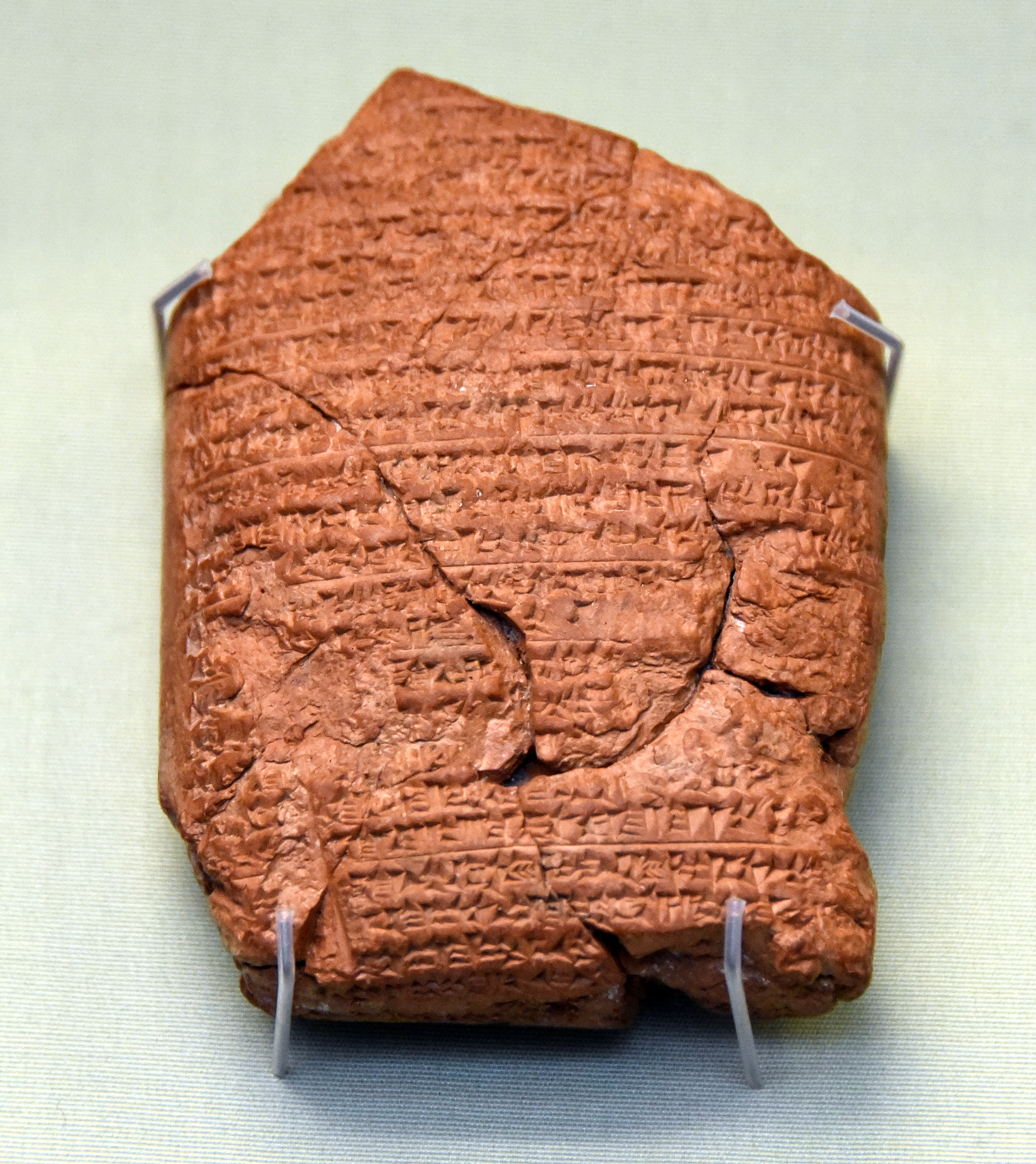
The cuneiform inscription on this clay tablet highlights the conquest of Jerusalem by Nebuchadnezzar II and the surrender of Jehoiakim, king of Judah, in 597 BC. From Babylon, Iraq.

Although Jehoiakim was Josiah's eldest son, he was passed over at the latter's death as being unworthy to be his father's successor, and his brother Jehoahaz mounted the throne in his place. Jehoahaz was publicly anointed king to offset his brother's claims to the throne (Seder 'Olam R. xxiv.; Hor. 11b; Ratner's objection ad loc. to Seder 'Olam was anticipated and answered by the Gemara). When, subsequently, Jehoiakim took the government, after Jehoahaz had been led captive to Egypt, he showed how little he resembled his pious father: he was a godless tyrant, committing the most atrocious sins and crimes. He lived in incestuous relations with his mother, daughter-in-law, and stepmother, and was in the habit of murdering men, whose wives he then violated and whose property he seized. His garments were of "shatnez", and in order to hide the fact that he was a Jew, he had made himself an epispasm by means of an operation, and had tattooed his body (Lev. R. xix. 6; Tan., Lek Leka, end; Midr. Aggadat Bereshit xlviii.; see also Sanh. 103b). He even boasted of his godlessness, saying, "My predecessors, Manasseh and Amon, did not know how they could make God most angry. But I speak openly; all that God gives us is light, and this we no longer need, since we have a kind of gold that shines just like the light; furthermore, God has given this gold to mankind [Ps. cxv. 16] and is not able to take it back again" (Sanh. l.c.).

When Jehoiakim was informed that Jeremiah was writing his Lamentations, he sent for the roll and calmly read the first four verses, remarking sarcastically, "I still am king." When he came to the fifth verse and saw the words, "For the Lord hath afflicted her for the multitude of her transgressions" (Lam. i. 5), he took the roll, scratched out the Names of God occurring therein, and threw it into the fire (M. Ḳ. 26a). No wonder then that God thought of "changing the world again into chaos", and refrained from doing so only because the Jewish people under this king were pious (Sanh. 103a). Yet punishment was not withheld. Nebuchadnezzar came with his army to Daphne, near Antiochia, and demanded from the Great Sanhedrin, whose members came to pay him their respects, that Jehoiakim be delivered to him, in which case he would not disturb the city and its inhabitants. The Sanhedrin went to Jehoiakim to inform him of Nebuchadnezzar's demand, and when he asked them whether it would be right to sacrifice him for their benefit, they reminded him of what David did in a similar case with the rebel Sheba (Lev. R. xix. 6).

Various opinions have been handed down concerning the circumstances of Jehoiakim's death, due to the difficulty of harmonizing the conflicting Biblical statements on this point (II Kings xxiv. 6; Jer. xxii. 18, 19; II Chron. xxxvi. 6). According to some, he died in Jerusalem before the Sanhedrin could comply with the demand made by Nebuchadnezzar, who therefore had to be content with the king's body, which was cast to him over the walls. Another version says that he died while being let down over the wall. Others, again, maintain that after leading him through the whole land of Judah, Nebuchadnezzar killed him, and then threw his corpse piecemeal to the dogs, or, as one version has it, put it into the skin of a dead ass (Lev. R. xix. 6; Seder'Olam R. xxv., agreeing in part with Josephus, "Ant." x. 6, § 3; see also Jerome to Jer. xxii. 18, and Nebuchadnezzar in Rabbinical Literature).

Even this shameful death, however, was not to be the end of the dead king, upon whose skull were scratched the words, "This and one more." After many centuries the Gemara relates: The grandfather of Rabbi Perida, Rabbi Ḥiyya bar Avuya, found the skull before the gates of Jerusalem; twice he piously buried it, but as often as he tried to cover it the earth refused to hold it. He then concluded that it was the skull of Jehoiakim, for whom Jeremiah had prophesied such an end (Jer. xxii. 18); and as he did not know what to do with it, he wrapped it in silk and hid it in a closet. After a time his wife found it and showed it to a neighbor, who said: "Your husband had another wife before you whom he can not forget, and therefore he keeps her skull." Thereupon the wife threw it into the fire, and when her husband returned he knew what the enigmatic words "this and one more" meant - Jehoiakim’s remains were not only cast out of Jerusalem but were denied the grave as they were burned (Sanh. 82a, 104a). In the Aggadah, Jehoiakim is still undergoing punishment for his sins. Although the Babylonian Talmud does not include him among those who have no place in the world to come (cf. Sanh. 103b), the Jerusalem Talmud cites him as an example of one who has forfeited his place in heaven by publicly transgressing the law. The sages also explain Proverbs 24:30 as follows: I passed by the field of a lazy man, This is Ahaz. And the vineyard of a senseless man, this is Manashe. And behold, it was all overgrown with thorns, this is Amon. And its surface was covered with Nettle, this is Jehoiakim. And its stone wall was broken down, this is a reference to Zedekiah, in whose days the Temple was destroyed.

== In popular culture ==
Jehoiakim is portrayed by Andrea Occhipinti in the film Jeremiah (1998).

== Sources ==
- King, Philip J (1993). Jeremiah: An Archaeological Companion. Westminster John Knox Press.
- The Nelson Study Bible. Thomas Nelson, Inc. 1997. ISBN 9780840715999.

Jehoiakim House of David
Regnal titles
Preceded by Jehoahaz	King of Judah; 609–598 BC	Succeeded by Jehoiachin
