= Josiah =

Biblical King of Judah

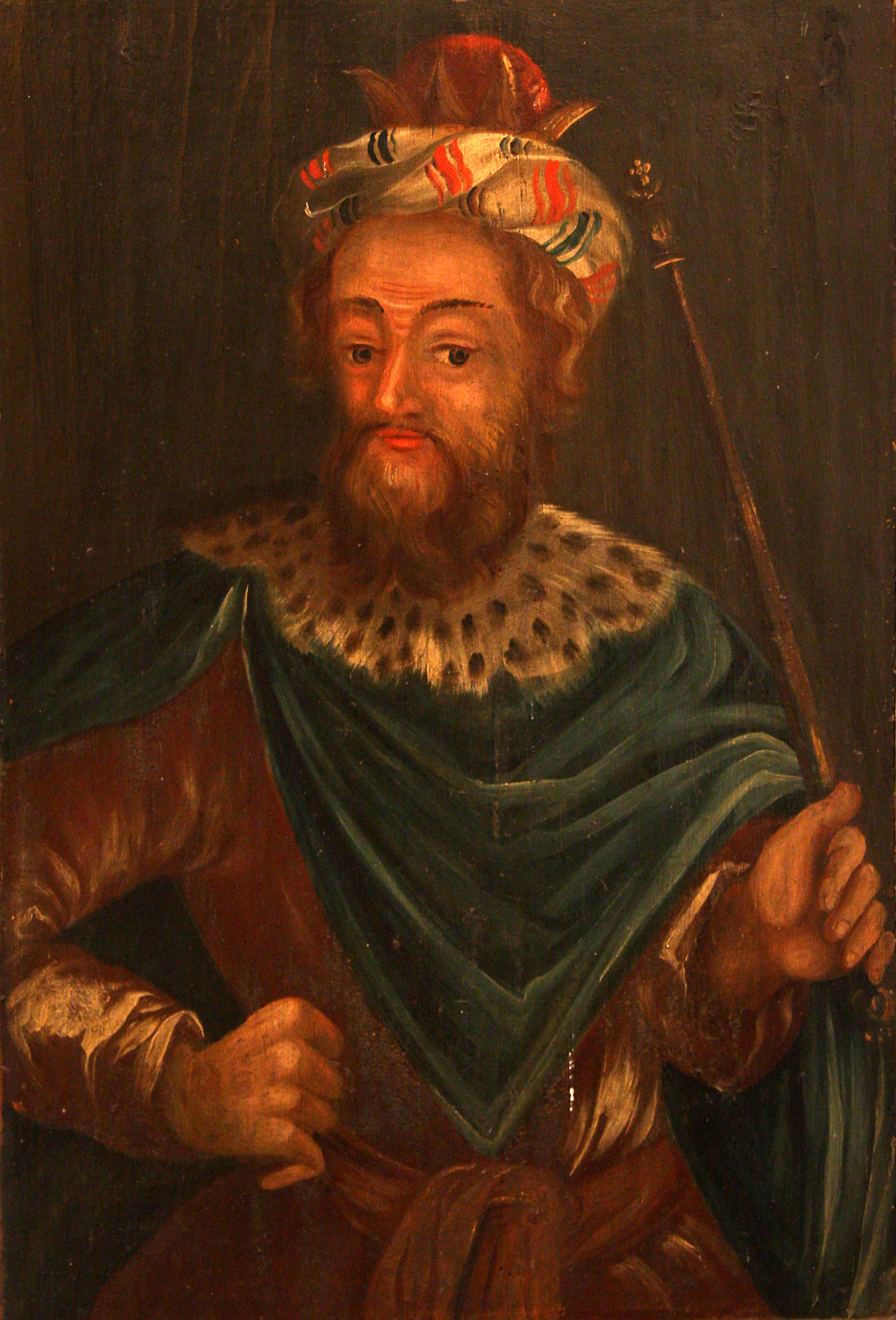
- Josiah in a painting by unknown artist in the choir of St. Mary's Church, Åhus, 17th century

King of Judah
- Reign: 640–609 BC
- Predecessor: Amon
- Successor: Jehoahaz
- Born: c. 648 BC probably Jerusalem
- Died: Tammuz (July/August) 609 BC (aged 38–39); Jerusalem
- Spouse: Zebudah; Hamutal
- Issue: Johanan; Jehoahaz; Jehoiakim; Zedekiah
- House: House of David
- Father: Amon
- Mother: Jedidah
- Religion: Yahwism

Josiah (Koine Greek: Ἰωσίας; Latin: Iosias) or Yoshiyahu (Biblical Hebrew: יֹאשִׁיָּהוּ, romanized: Yōʾšiyyāhū, lit. 'healed or supported by God') was the 16th king of Judah (c. 640–609 BC). Josiah’s reign is difficult to reconstruct, but the evidence suggests Judah remained largely under foreign suzerainty, with limited territorial expansion; the accuracy of the depictions of his religious reform descriptions is widely debated among scholars.

According to the Hebrew Bible, Josiah became king of Judah at age eight after his father’s assassination and reigned for 31 years. According to 2 Kings, in his 18th year, the discovery of the “Book of the Law” prompted Josiah to undertake major reforms, centralizing worship in Jerusalem, destroying other shrines and idols, and extending his reforms north.

Despite no direct reference to Josiah in other contemporary texts from Egypt or Babylon, and no inscriptions bearing his name, a seal bearing the name "Nathan-melech," an official under Josiah mentioned in 2 Kings 23:11, was discovered in situ in an archeological site in Jerusalem.

The influence of Josiah's reign may be evident in the Deuteronomistic History, a collection of biblical texts that evaluate the reigns of Israelite and Judahite kings based on their adherence to the laws of Deuteronomy. Josiah is depicted as the most righteous king in this tradition, the only one to fully implement the reforms outlined in the "Book of the Law."

== Biblical narrative ==
The Bible describes him as a righteous king in 2 Kings 22:2, "He did what was pleasing to GOD and he followed all the ways of his forefather David; he did not deviate to the right or to the left." A similar phrase appears in 2 Chronicles 34:2. He is also one of the kings mentioned in the Gospel of Matthew, one of the two genealogies of Jesus in the New Testament (cf. Matthew 1:10–11).

=== Family ===
According to the biblical narrative, Josiah was the son of King Amon of Judah and Jedidah, daughter of Adaiah of Bozkath. His grandfather Manasseh was one of the kings blamed for turning away from the worship of YHWH. Manasseh adapted the Temple for idolatrous worship. Josiah's great-grandfather was King Hezekiah, a noted reformer also respected by the biblical writers as having "done what was right in the sight of the LORD, as David had done." in 2 Kings 18:3 and 2 Chronicles 29:2.

According to 1 Chronicles 3:15, 2 Kings 23:31 and 36, 2 Kings 24:18, Josiah had four sons: Johanan and Eliakim (born c. 634 BC), whose mother was Zebidah, the daughter of Pedaiah of Ruma; and Shallum (633/632 BC) and Mattanyahu (c. 618 BC), whose mother was Hamutal, the daughter of Jeremiah of Libnah. Eliakim had his name changed by the Saïte pharaoh Necho II to Jehoiakim according to 2 Kings 23:34.

Shallum, his third son, succeeded Josiah as Jehoahaz according to 1 Chronicles 3:15 and Jeremiah 22:11. Eliakim succeeded Shallum as Jehoiakim in 2 Chronicles 36:4, and he was succeeded by his son Jeconiah in 2 Chronicles 36:8. Jeconiah was succeeded to the throne by his uncle Mattanyahu, under the name Zedekiah in 2 Kings 24:17. Zedekiah was the last king of Judah before the kingdom was conquered by the Neo-Babylonian Empire and the Babylonian captivity began.

=== Religious reform ===
The Second Book of Chronicles records that Josiah was eight years old when he became king. In the eighth year of his reign, he "began to seek the God of his father David" and in the twelfth year of that reign he began a program of destruction of Baalist altars and images throughout Jerusalem and Judah according to 2 Chronicles 34:1-3. The Chronicler records in detail the execution of this program. In contrast, the account in 2 Kings begins with a restoration of Solomon's Temple in Jerusalem, which both accounts say was initiated in the eighteenth year of his reign.

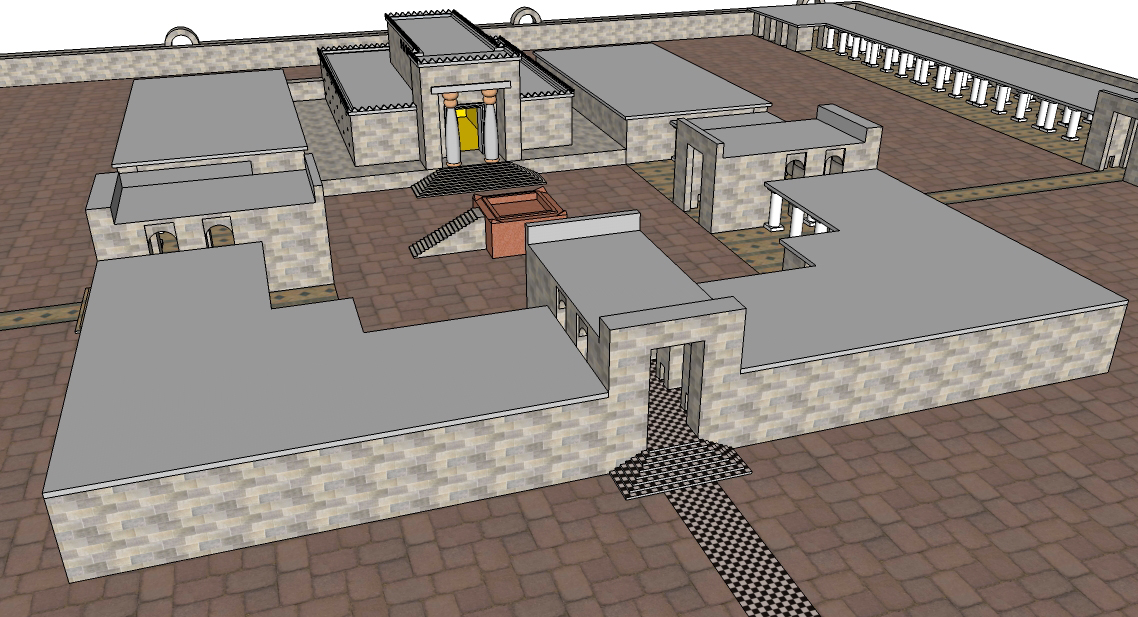
View of the inner court and Holy Place of Solomon's Temple depicted in a 3-D computer model

Josiah ordered Hilkiah, the High Priest, to use the tax money collected over the years to renovate the Temple. While Hilkiah was clearing the treasure room of the Temple, he allegedly discovered a scroll described in 2 Kings 22:8 as "a scroll of the Teaching" and in 2 Chronicles 34:14 as "the book of the Law of the LORD given by Moses". The phrase "scroll of the Teaching" (Biblical Hebrew: ספר התורה, romanized: sēp̄er hat-torā) in 2 Kings 22:8 is identical to the phrase used in Joshua 1:8 and 8:34 to describe the sacred writings Joshua had received from Moses. The book is not identified in the text, but scholarly consensus holds that this was either a copy of the Book of Deuteronomy or a text that became a part of Deuteronomy.

The story of the Temple restoration is based on those ordered by an earlier Judean king, Joash in 2 Kings 12, who ruled c. 836 – 796 BC.

Hilkiah brought this scroll to Josiah's attention. Josiah consulted the prophetess Huldah, who assured him that the evil foretold in the document for non-observance of its instructions, would come, but not in his day; "because", she said, "thine heart was tender and thou didst humble thyself before the Lord". An assembly of the elders of Judah and Jerusalem and of all the people was called, and Josiah then encouraged the exclusive worship of YHWH, forbidding all other forms of worship. The instruments and emblems of the worship of Baal and "heavenly host" were removed from the Temple in Jerusalem. Local sanctuaries, known as high places, were destroyed from Beersheba in the south to Bethel and the cities of Samaria in the north. Josiah had pagan priests executed and even had the bones of the dead priests of Bethel exhumed from their graves and burned on their altars. Josiah also reinstituted Passover celebrations.

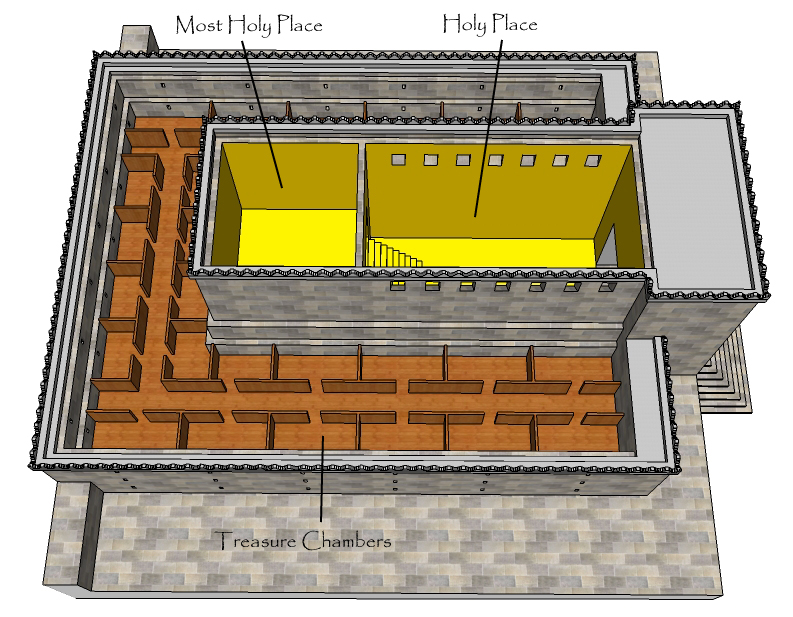
View of Solomon's Temple with ceiling removed as depicted in a 3-D computer model

According to 1 Kings 13:1–3 an unnamed "man of God" (sometimes identified as Iddo) had prophesied to King Jeroboam of the northern Kingdom of Israel (Samaria), approximately three hundred years earlier, that "a son named Josiah will be born to the house of David" and that he would destroy the altar at Bethel. And the only exception to this destruction was for the grave of an unnamed prophet he found in Bethel (2 Kings 23:15–19), who had foretold that these religious sites Jeroboam erected would one day be destroyed (see 1 Kings 13). Josiah ordered the double grave of the "man of God" and of the Bethel prophet to be left alone, as these prophecies had come true.

Josiah's reforms are described in two biblical accounts, 2 Kings 22–23, and 2 Chronicles 34–35. They began with the ending of ancient Israelite religious practices, and the astral cults that had become popular in the 8th century, and led to centralisation of worship in Jerusalem, and the destruction of the temple at Bethel. Some scholars have rejected the entire historicity of these accounts, while others have defended the historical existence of a religious reform under Josiah's reign.

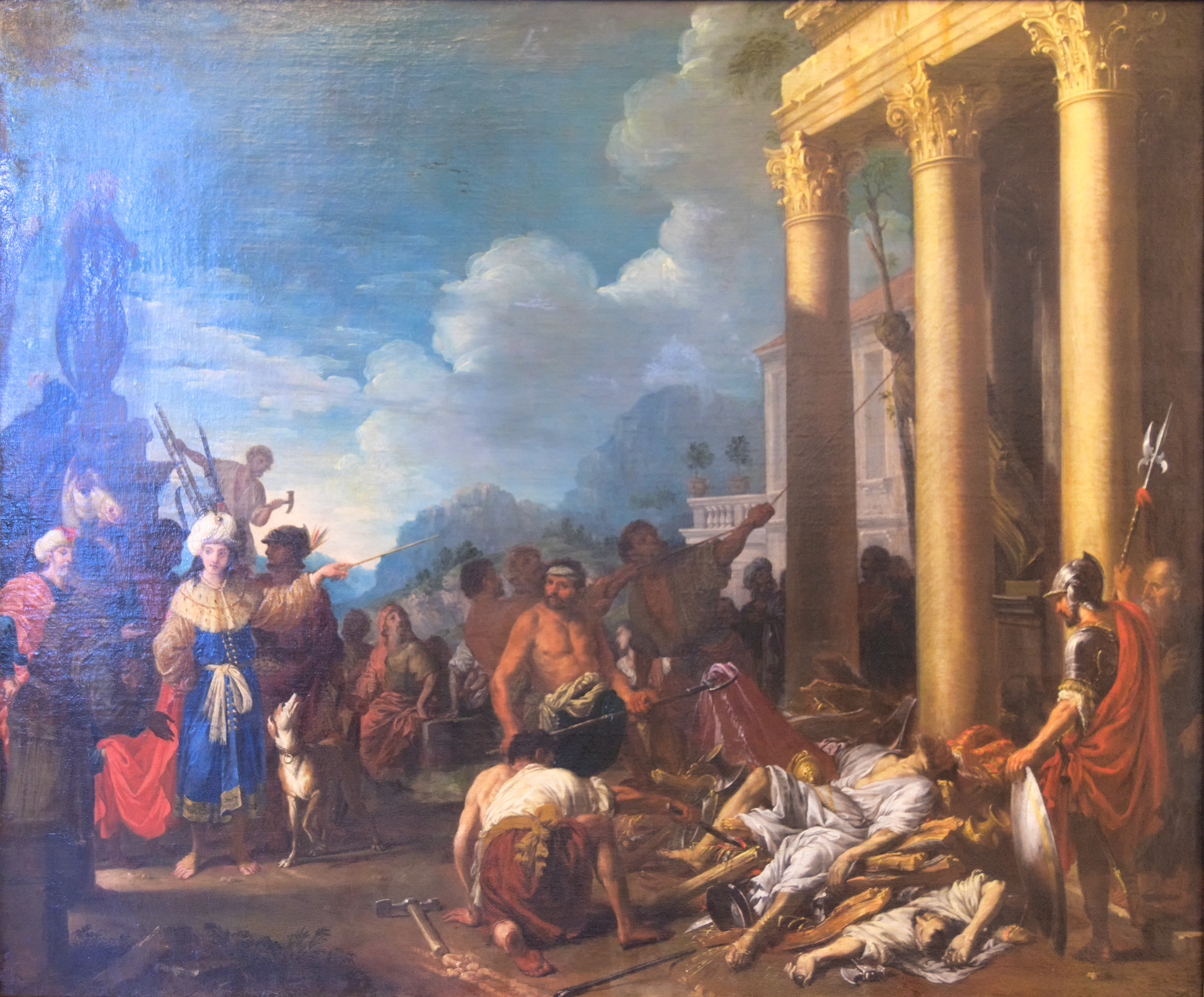
Josiah's destruction of idols of Pagan worship later became a theme in Christian art

According to the later account in 2 Chronicles, Josiah destroyed altars and images of certain pagan deities in cities of the tribes of Manasseh, Ephraim, "and Simeon, as far as Naphtali" (2 Chronicles 34:6–7), which were outside of his kingdom, Judah, and returned the Ark of the Covenant to the Temple.

=== Book of the Law ===
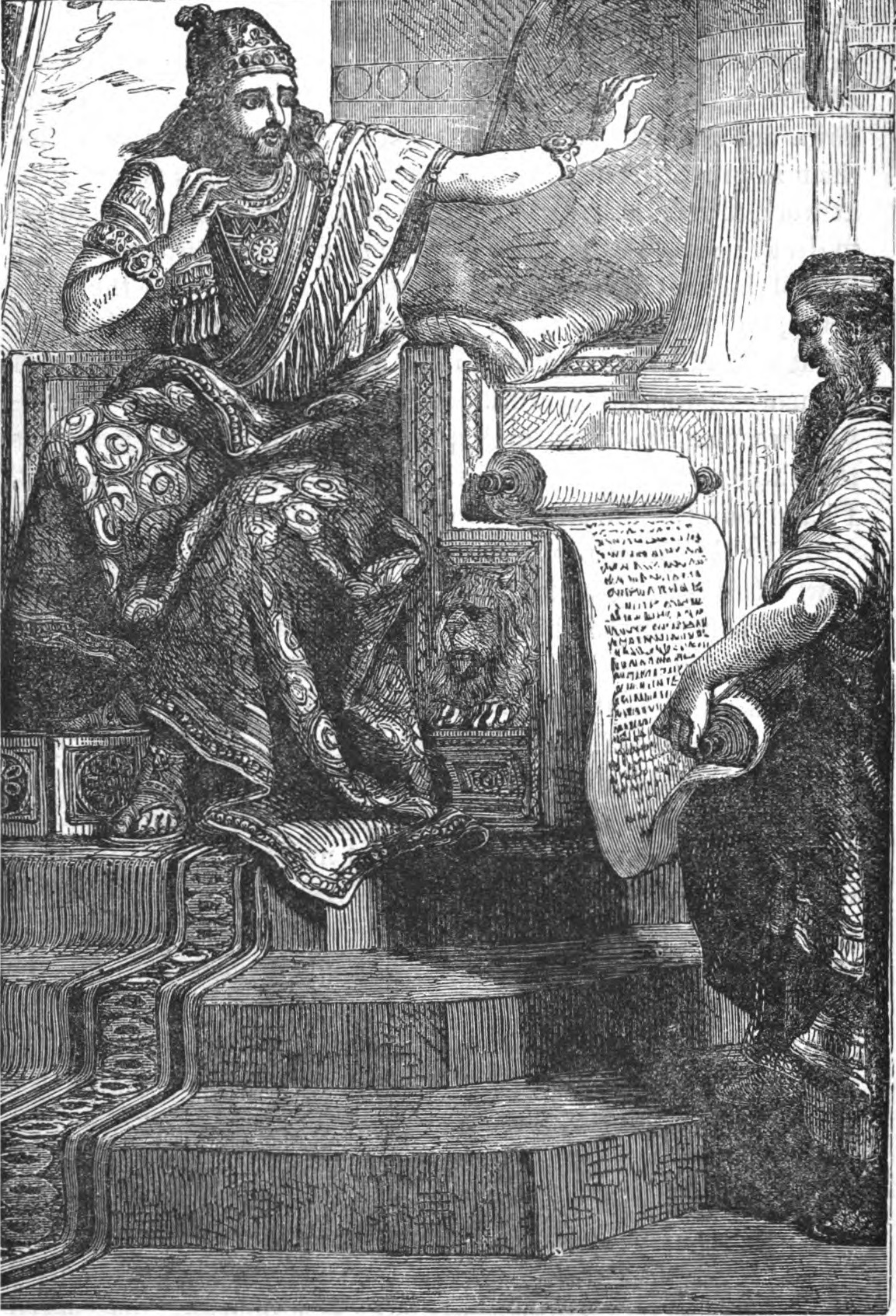
Josiah Hearing the Book of the Law (1873)

The Hebrew Bible states that the priest Hilkiah found a "Book of the Law" in the temple during the early stages of Josiah's temple renovation. Hilkiah then gave the scroll to his secretary Shaphan, who took it to King Josiah. According to the Bible, King Josiah then changed his leadership entirely, entering into a new covenant with God. He wiped out rival cults that had formed within his land. He, along with his people, then entered into this new covenant with God to keep the commandments.

For much of the nineteenth and twentieth centuries, it was widely accepted among biblical scholars that this "Book of the Law" was an early version of the Book of Deuteronomy, but recent scholarship views it as a largely legendary narrative of one of the earliest stages in the creation of the Deuteronomistic work. William G. Dever, for example, argues that the Book of the Law was actually composed by orthodox Yahwist priests, who attributed it to the legendary figure of Moses and then hid it in the Temple, where it would be dramatically discovered; in this way, a "miraculous new Word from Yahweh" would seem to have appeared, giving Judah a chance to redeem itself and save itself from the advance of the Neo-Babylonian Empire.

Many scholars view the entire core narrative, from Joshua to 2 Kings, as a Deuteronomistic History (DtrH) written during Josiah's reign. In fact, some recent European theologians even go so far as to posit that most of the Torah and Deuteronomistic History was composed and finalized several centuries later, during the Persian rule. However, biblical scholars are coming to believe that the Deuteronomistic History was composed using other earlier sources, including a brief chronicle of king's names, age at the beginning of their reign, and their mother's names.

=== Prophets and King Josiah ===
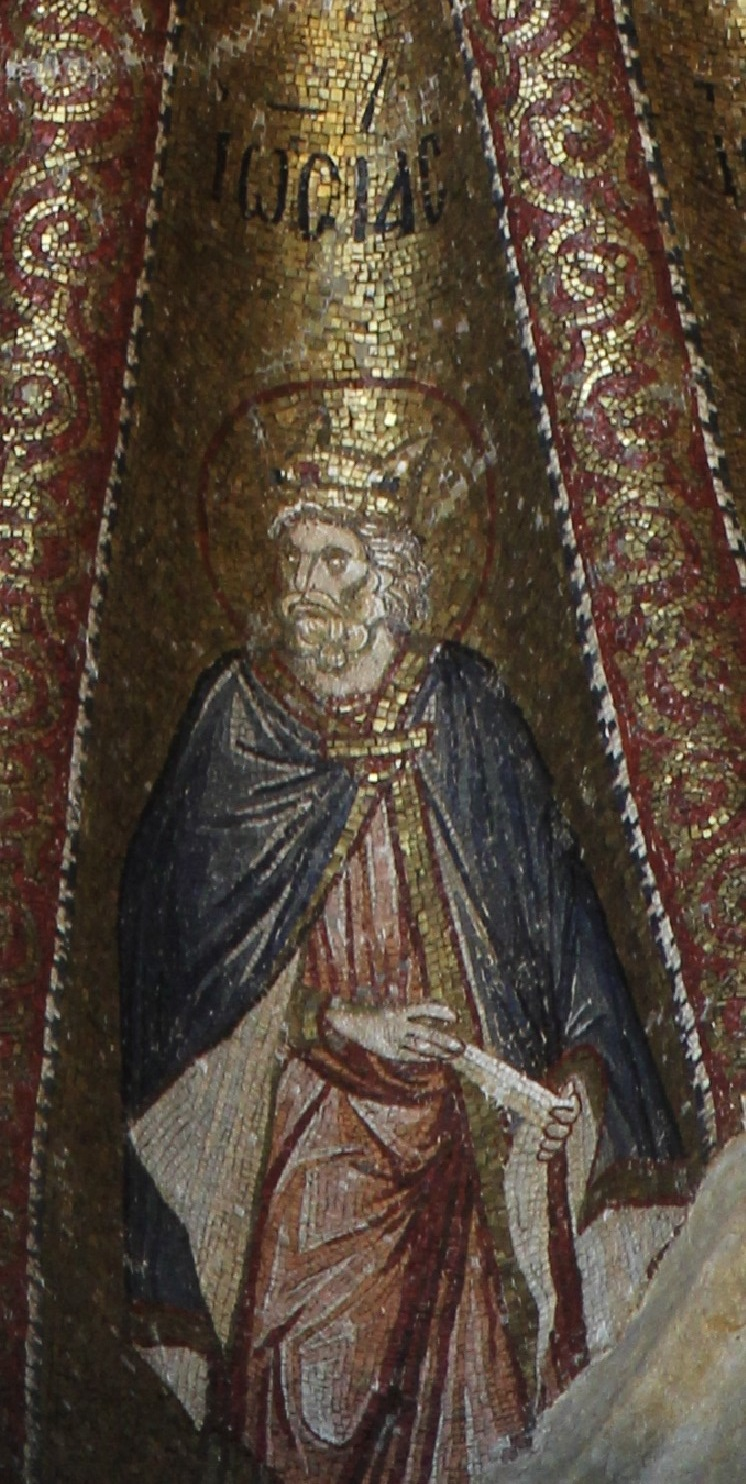
Depiction of King Josiah on the mosaic of the genealogy of the Virgin Mary in the Chora Church, in the north dome of the inner narthex, Istanbul, Turkey (14th century).

According to rabbinic interpretation, Huldah said to the messengers of King Josiah, "Tell the man that sent you to me ..." (2 Kings 22:15), indicating by her unceremonious language that for her Josiah was like any other man. The king addressed her, and not Jeremiah, because he thought that women are more easily stirred to pity than men, and that therefore the prophetess would be more likely than Jeremiah to intercede with God in his behalf. Huldah was a relative of Jeremiah, both being descendants of Rahab by her marriage with Joshua. While Jeremiah admonished and preached repentance to the men, she did the same to the women. Huldah was not only a prophetess, but taught publicly in the school according to the Targum of 2 Kings 22:14. It is doubtful whether "the Gate of Huldah" in the Second Temple (Middot 1:3) has any connection with the prophetess Huldah; it may have meant "Cat's Gate"; some scholars, such as Rashi, associate the gate with Huldah's schoolhouse.

The prophetic activity of Jeremiah began in the reign of Josiah; he was a contemporary of his relative the prophetess Hulda and of his teacher Zephaniah. These three prophets divided their activity: Hulda spoke to the women and Jeremiah to the men in the street, while Zephaniah preached in the synagogue. When Josiah restored the true worship, Jeremiah went to the exiled ten tribes, whom he brought to Israel under the rule of the pious king. Although Josiah went to war with Egypt against the prophet's advice, Jeremiah knew that this was an error by the otherwise pious king; and later he bitterly laments the king's death: the fourth chapter of Lamentations beginning with a dirge on Josiah.

King Josiah, who foresaw the impending national catastrophe, concealed the Ark and its contents (including Aaron's rod, the vial of manna and the anointing oil) within a hidden chamber which had been built by Solomon] (Tosefta, Sotah, 13a); cf. Babylonian Talmud (Kereithot 5b) and their whereabouts will remain unknown until, in the Messianic age, the prophet Elijah shall reveal them (Mekhilta l.c.).

=== Foreign relations ===
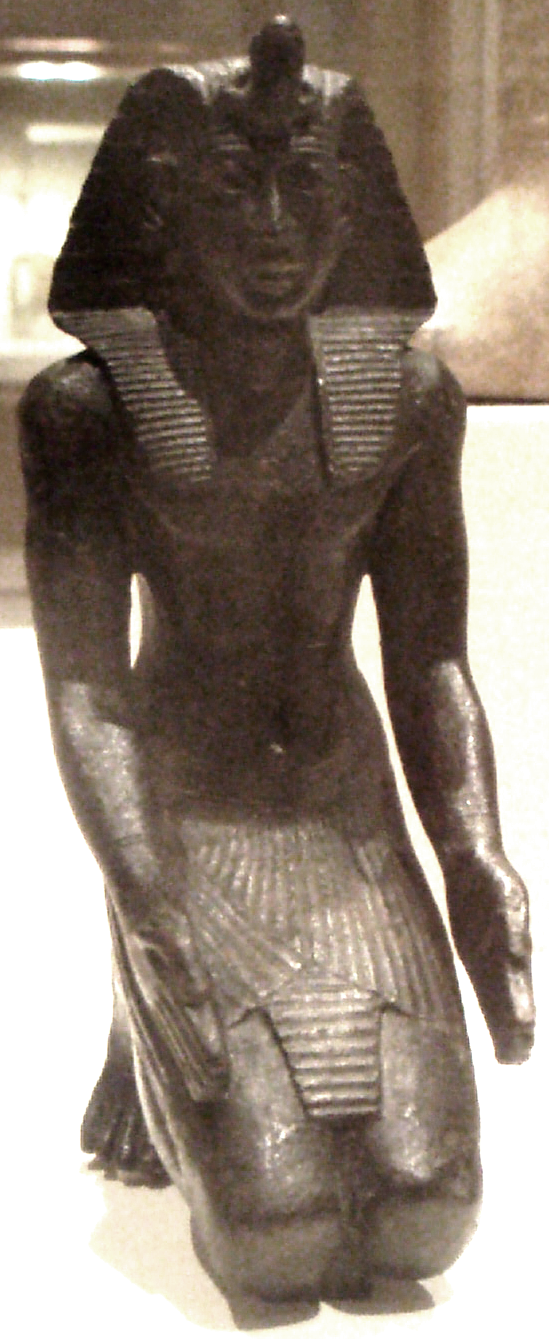
Pharaoh Necho II

When Josiah became king of Judah in about 641 or 640 BC, the international situation was in flux. The Assyrian Empire was beginning to disintegrate, the Neo-Babylonian Empire had not yet risen to replace it, and Egypt to the west was still recovering from Assyrian rule. In this power vacuum, Jerusalem was able to govern itself for the time being without foreign intervention.

In the spring of 609 BC, Pharaoh Necho II led a sizable army up to the Euphrates River to aid the Neo-Assyrian Empire, which was collapsing under the attacks of the Medes and the Neo-Babylonian Empire. Taking the coast route Via Maris into Syria at the head of a large army, consisting mainly of mercenaries; and supported by his Mediterranean fleet along the shore, Necho passed the low tracts of Philistia and Sharon. However, the passage over the ridge of hills which shuts in on the south of the great Jezreel Valley was blocked by the Judean army led by Josiah. The reason for Josiah attempting to halt the Egyptian campaign is not known, but he may have considered that the Assyrians and Egyptians were weakened by the death of pharaoh Psamtik I only a year earlier (610 BC): Psamtik having been appointed and confirmed by Assyrian kings Esarhaddon and Ashurbanipal. According to the Biblical Books of Chronicles, Necho had not intended to do battle with the Judeans and was confused by Josiah's decision to attack him, supposedly sending a letter saying "what have we done to each other, king of Judah? I am not coming against you this day."

Josiah attempted to block the advance at Megiddo, where a fierce battle was fought and Josiah was killed. Necho then joined forces with the Assyrian Ashur-uballit II and crossed the Euphrates to lay siege to Harran. The combined forces failed to capture the city, and Necho retreated to northern Syria.

=== Death ===
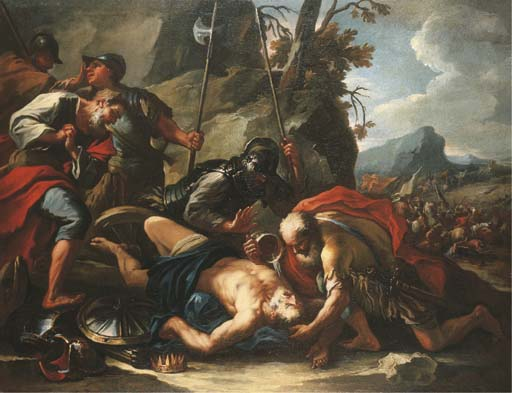
Death of king Josiah as illustrated by Francesco Conti

There are two accounts of Josiah's death in the Bible, both involving the Battle of Megiddo (609 BC). 2 Kings merely states that Necho II met Josiah at Megiddo and killed him in 23:29, whereas the 2 Chronicles 35:20–27 gives a lengthier account and states that Josiah was fatally wounded by Egyptian archers and was brought back to Jerusalem to die. His death in the latter account was attributed to his "not listening to what Necho had said at God's command" when Necho said, "What have I to do with you, king of Judah? I am not coming against you today, but against the house with which I am at war; and God has commanded me to hurry. Cease opposing God, who is with me, so that he will not destroy you." According to 2 Chronicles 35:25, Jeremiah wrote a lament for Josiah's death.

The account in Chronicles is considered unreliable by some scholars, as it is based on the description of the death of a different king, Ahab, in 1 Kings, and it meets the Chronicler's religious agenda to attribute the death of a righteous king to some form of sin.

Some researchers have concluded from the account in Kings that Josiah did not meet Necho in battle but was summoned by Necho as a vassal, investigated, and beheaded for failing to pay the correct tribute or tax to Egypt.

Rabbinic literature remarks on Josiah's piety and his father, Amon:

The fact that Amon was the most sinful of all the wicked kings of Judah (II Chron. xxxiii. 23) is brought out in the Talmud (Sanh. 103b) as follows (Sanh. 104a): Ahaz suspended the sacrificial worship, Manasseh tore down the altar, Amon made it a place of desolation [covered it with cobwebs]; Ahaz sealed up the scrolls of the Law (Isa. viii. 16), Manasseh cut out the sacred name, Amon burnt the scrolls altogether [compare Seder Olam, R. xxiv. This is derived from the story of the finding of the Book of the Law, II Kings, xxii. 8]; Ahab permitted incest, Manasseh committed it himself, Amon acted as Nero was said to have done toward his mother Agrippina. And yet, out of respect for his son Josiah, Amon's name was not placed on the list of the kings excluded from the world to come."

It also states that his death happened because, despite his sincere religious reforms, he had in fact been deceived. He refused to heed Jeremiah, thinking that no sword would pass through Judah. He was struck by 300 hurled darts; he made no complaint except to acknowledge "The Lord is righteous, for I rebelled against His commandment."

=== Succession ===
After the setback in Harran, the Pharaoh Necho left a sizeable force in Judah and returned to Egypt. On his return march, Necho found that Jehoahaz had succeeded his father Josiah as King of Judah. (2 Kings 23:31) Necho deposed Jehoahaz, who had been king of Judah for only three months, and replaced him with Jehoahaz's older brother, Jehoiakim. Necho imposed on Judah a levy of a hundred talents of silver (about 3 3/4 tons or about 3.4 metric tons) and a talent of gold (about 75 pounds or about 34 kilograms). Necho then took Jehoahaz back to Egypt as his prisoner.

Necho had left Egypt in 609 BC to relieve the Assyrian Harran under Babylonian siege. The actions of Josiah may have provided aid to the Babylonians by engaging the Egyptian army.

== Sources ==
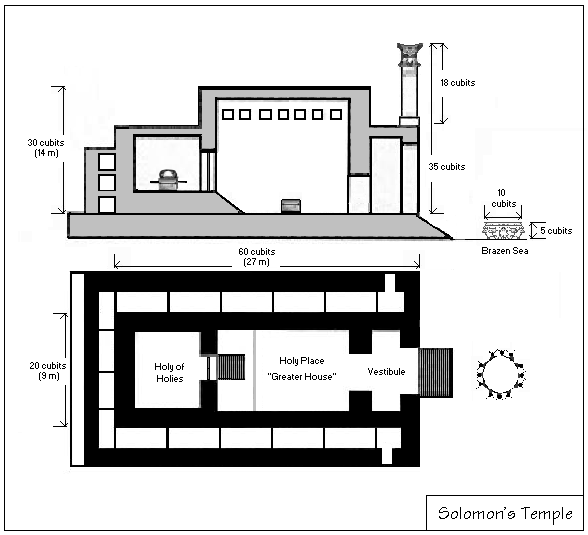
A sketch of the Temple of Solomon based on descriptions in the Tanakh.

The only textual sources of information for Josiah's reign are from the Bible, notably 2 Kings 22–23 and 2 Chronicles 34–35. No archaeological evidence for Josiah as a person exists. However, a bulla (impression seal) has been found in the "City of David" archaeological site in Jerusalem featuring the name of one of King Josiah's officials, Nathan-melech, mentioned in 2 Kings 23:11. The inscription of the ring says, "(belonging) to Netanmelek, Servant of the King". Although it may not directly mention King Josiah by name, it does appear to be from the same time period in which he would have lived. Seals and seal impressions from the period show a transition from those of an earlier period which bear images of stars and the moon, to seals that carry only names, a possible indication of Josiah's enforcement of monotheism. Other possible archaeological evidence of Josiah's religious reforms may have been discovered at Tel Dothan and Mordot Arnona in Jerusalem.

The date of Josiah's death can be established fairly accurately. The Babylonian Chronicles date the battle at Harran between the Assyrians and their Egyptian allies against the Babylonians from Tammuz (July–August) to Elul (August–September) 609 BC. On that basis, Josiah was killed in the month of Tammuz (July–August) 609 BC, when the Egyptians were on their way to Harran.

== See also ==
- List of artifacts in biblical archaeology

Josiah House of David
Preceded by Amon	King of Judah; 641–610 BCE; Died at Tammuz in July–August 609 BCE	Succeeded by Jehoahaz
