= Jeremiah 43 =

Book of Jeremiah, chapter 43

- ← chapter 42 chapter 44 →
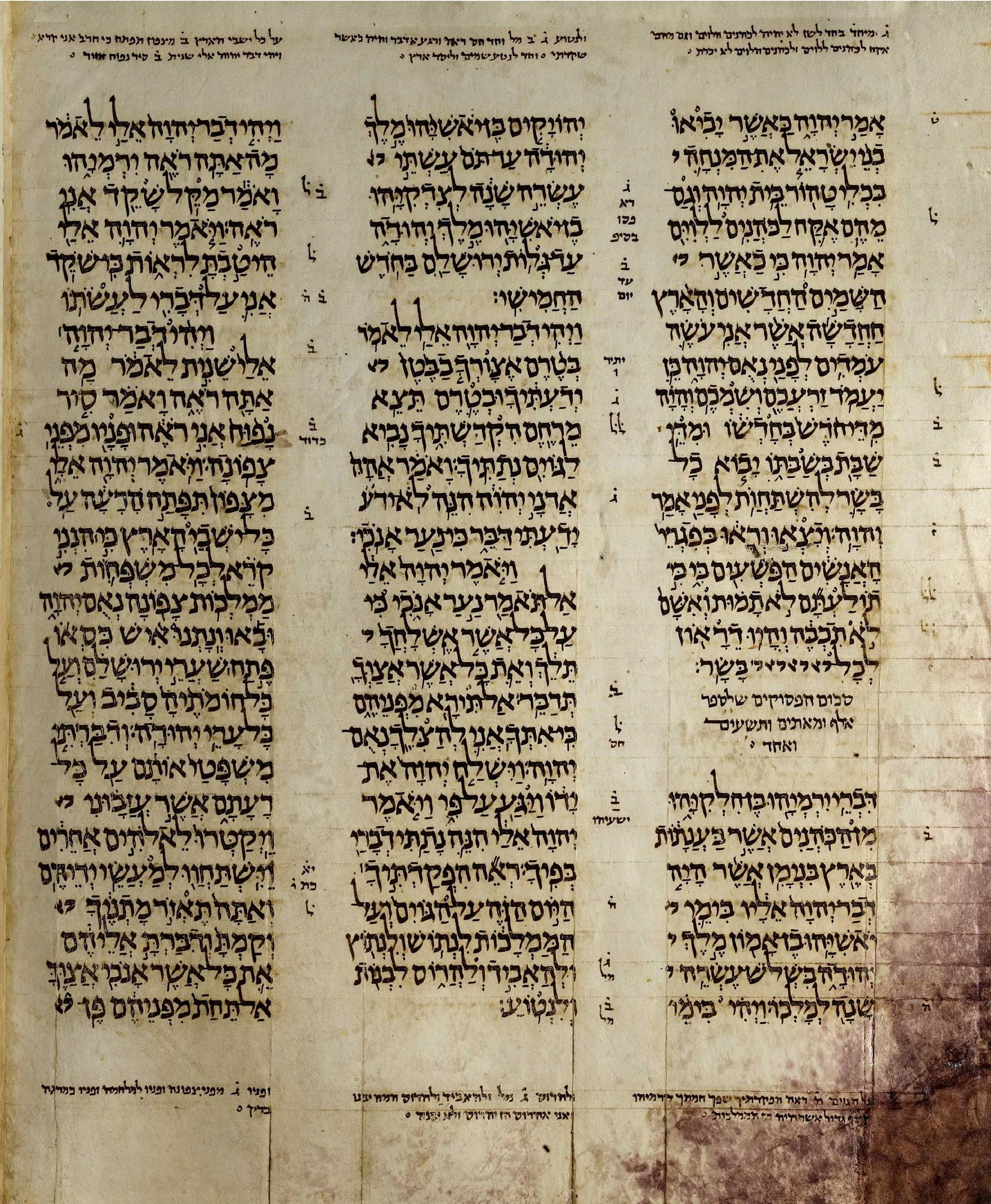
- A high resolution scan of the Aleppo Codex showing the Book of Jeremiah (the sixth book in Nevi'im).
- Book: Book of Jeremiah
- Hebrew Bible part: Nevi'im
- Order in the Hebrew part: 6
- Category: Latter Prophets
- Christian Bible part: Old Testament
- Order in the Christian part: 24

Jeremiah 43 is the forty-third chapter of the Book of Jeremiah in the Hebrew Bible or the Old Testament of the Christian Bible. This book contains prophecies attributed to the prophet Jeremiah, and is one of the Books of the Prophets. This chapter is part of a narrative section consisting of chapters 37 to 44. Chapters 42-44 describe the emigration to Egypt involving the remnant who remained in Judah after much of the population was exiled to Babylon. In this chapter, Jeremiah performs in Egypt one of the sign-acts distinctive of his prophetic style.

== Text ==
The original text was written in Hebrew. This chapter is divided into 13 verses.

=== Textual witnesses ===
Some early manuscripts containing the text of this chapter in Hebrew are of the Masoretic Text tradition, which includes the Codex Cairensis (895), the Petersburg Codex of the Prophets (916), Aleppo Codex (10th century), Codex Leningradensis (1008). Some fragments containing parts of this chapter were found among the Dead Sea Scrolls, i.e., 4QJer^{d} (4Q72a; mid 2nd century BCE) with extant verses 2‑10, and 2QJer (2Q13; 1st century CE), with extant verses 8‑11.

There is also a translation into Koine Greek known as the Septuagint (with a different chapter numbering), made in the last few centuries BCE. Extant ancient manuscripts of the Septuagint version include Codex Vaticanus (B; $\mathfrak{G}$^{B}; 4th century), Codex Sinaiticus (S; BHK: $\mathfrak{G}$^{S}; 4th century), Codex Alexandrinus (A; $\mathfrak{G}$^{A}; 5th century) and Codex Marchalianus (Q; $\mathfrak{G}$^{Q}; 6th century).

== Parashot ==
The parashah sections listed here are based on the Aleppo Codex. Jeremiah 43 is a part of the "Sixteenth prophecy (Jeremiah 40-45)" in the section of Prophecies interwoven with narratives about the prophet's life (Jeremiah 26-45). {P}: open parashah; {S}: closed parashah.

{S} 43:1 {S} 43:2-7 {S} 43:8-13 {P}

== Verse numbering ==
The order of chapters and verses of the Book of Jeremiah in the English Bibles, Masoretic Text (Hebrew), and Vulgate (Latin), in some places differs from that in the Septuagint (LXX, the Greek Bible used in the Eastern Orthodox Church and others) according to Rahlfs or Brenton. The following table is taken with minor adjustments from Brenton's Septuagint, page 971.

The order of Computer Assisted Tools for Septuagint/Scriptural Study (CATSS) based on Alfred Rahlfs' Septuaginta (1935) differs in some details from Joseph Ziegler's critical edition (1957) in Göttingen LXX. Swete's Introduction mostly agrees with Rahlfs' edition (=CATSS).

Hebrew, Vulgate, English	Rahlfs' LXX (CATSS)
43:1-13	50:1-13
36:1-32	43:1-32

== Verses 5–6 ==
^{5}But Johanan the son of Kareah and all the captains of the forces took all the remnant of Judah who had returned to dwell in the land of Judah, from all nations where they had been driven— ^{6}men, women, children, the king’s daughters, and every person whom Nebuzaradan the captain of the guard had left with Gedaliah the son of Ahikam, the son of Shaphan, and Jeremiah the prophet and Baruch the son of Neriah.

== Verse 7 ==
And they came into the land of Egypt, for they did not obey the voice of the Lord. And they arrived at Tahpanhes.

- "Tahpanhes": an important fortress city on the northern border of ancient Egypt in the northeastern Nile delta; generally equated with the Greek city of Daphne; mentioned in Jeremiah 2:16 in conjunction with Memphis (the Hebrew name is “Noph”).

== Verse 8 ==
Then the word of the Lord came to Jeremiah in Tahpanhes.

Jeremiah was in Egypt "not out of choice, but by constraint".

== Verse 13 ==
He shall break also the images of Bethshemesh, that is in the land of Egypt; and the houses of the gods of the Egyptians shall he burn with fire.

- "Bethshemesh": Lit. House of the Sun, ancient "On" (Genesis 41:45; 10 km (6.2 mi) northeast of Cairo, the ancient worship center of sun-god Re, Isaiah 19:18), later called "Heliopolis". The oracle is to describe that Egypt is not a safe refuge from Nebuchadnezzar II ("he" in this verse; called "my servant" in Jeremiah 25:9; 27:6) who defeated Amasis (Ahmosis II) in 568/567 BCE, and accomplished the prophesied deeds.

== See also ==
- Babylon
- Baruch ben Neriah
- Beth-shemesh
- Chaldean
- Egypt
- Gedaliah the son of Ahikam, the son of Saphan
- Nebuchadnezzar
- Tahpanhes
- Related Bible part: Jeremiah 42, Jeremiah 44, Jeremiah 45

== Sources ==
- Coogan, Michael David (2007). Coogan, Michael David; Brettler, Marc Zvi; Newsom, Carol Ann; Perkins, Pheme (eds.). The New Oxford Annotated Bible with the Apocryphal/Deuterocanonical Books: New Revised Standard Version, Issue 48 (Augmented 3rd ed.). Oxford University Press. ISBN 9780195288810.
- Huey, F. B. (1993). The New American Commentary - Jeremiah, Lamentations: An Exegetical and Theological Exposition of Holy Scripture, NIV Text. B&H Publishing Group. ISBN 9780805401165.
- O'Connor, Kathleen M. (2007). "23. Jeremiah". In Barton, John; Muddiman, John (eds.). The Oxford Bible Commentary (first (paperback) ed.). Oxford University Press. pp. 487–533. ISBN 978-0199277186.
- Thompson, J. A. (1980). A Book of Jeremiah. The New International Commentary on the Old Testament (illustrated, revised ed.). Wm. B. Eerdmans Publishing. ISBN 9780802825308.
- Würthwein, Ernst (1995). The Text of the Old Testament. Translated by Rhodes, Erroll F. Grand Rapids, MI: Wm. B. Eerdmans. ISBN 0-8028-0788-7.
