= Jeremiah 41 =

Book of Jeremiah, chapter 41

- ← chapter 40 chapter 42 →
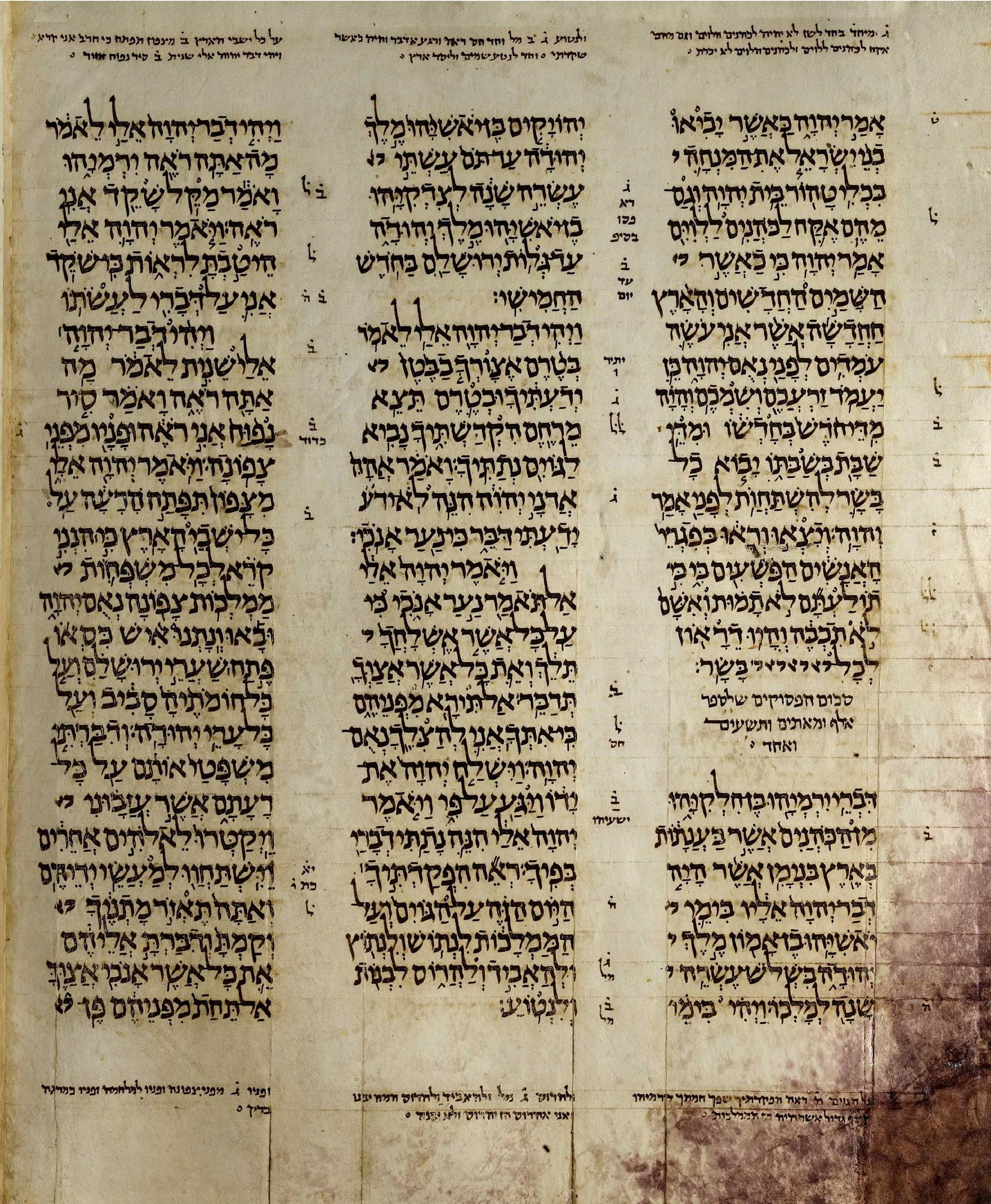
- A high resolution scan of the Aleppo Codex showing the Book of Jeremiah (the sixth book in Nevi'im).
- Book: Book of Jeremiah
- Hebrew Bible part: Nevi'im
- Order in the Hebrew part: 6
- Category: Latter Prophets
- Christian Bible part: Old Testament
- Order in the Christian part: 24

Jeremiah 41 is the forty-first chapter of the Book of Jeremiah in the Hebrew Bible or the Old Testament of the Christian Bible. This book contains prophecies attributed to the prophet Jeremiah, and is one of the Books of the Prophets. This chapter is part of a narrative section consisting of chapters 37 to 44. Chapter 41 recounts the murder of Gedaliah, the Babylonian governor of occupied Judah, and the chaotic situation which followed this event. Jeremiah himself is not mentioned in this chapter.

== Text ==
The original text was written in Hebrew. This chapter is divided into 18 verses.

=== Verse numbering ===
The order of chapters and verses of the Book of Jeremiah in the English Bibles, Masoretic Text (Hebrew), and Vulgate (Latin), in some places differs from that in the Septuagint (LXX, the Greek Bible used in the Eastern Orthodox Church and others) according to Rahlfs or Brenton. The following table is taken with minor adjustments from Brenton's Septuagint, page 971.

The order of Computer Assisted Tools for Septuagint/Scriptural Study (CATSS) based on Alfred Rahlfs' Septuaginta (1935) differs in some details from Joseph Ziegler's critical edition (1957) in Göttingen LXX. Swete's Introduction mostly agrees with Rahlfs edition (=CATSS).

Hebrew, Vulgate, English	Rahlfs' LXX (CATSS)
41:1-18	48:1-18
34:1-22	41:1-22

=== Textual witnesses ===
Some early manuscripts containing the text of this chapter in Hebrew are of the Masoretic Text tradition, which includes the Codex Cairensis (895), the Petersburg Codex of the Prophets (916), Aleppo Codex (10th century), Codex Leningradensis (1008).

There is also a translation into Koine Greek known as the Septuagint (with a different chapter and verse numbering), made in the last few centuries BCE. Extant ancient manuscripts of the Septuagint version include Codex Vaticanus (B; $\mathfrak{G}$^{B}; 4th century), Codex Sinaiticus (S; BHK: $\mathfrak{G}$^{S}; 4th century), Codex Alexandrinus (A; $\mathfrak{G}$^{A}; 5th century) and Codex Marchalianus (Q; $\mathfrak{G}$^{Q}; 6th century).

== Parashot ==
The parashah sections listed here are based on the Aleppo Codex. Jeremiah 41 is a part of the "Sixteenth prophecy (Jeremiah 40-45)" in the section of Prophecies interwoven with narratives about the prophet's life (Jeremiah 26-45). {P}: open parashah; {S}: closed parashah.

{P} 41:1-10 {S} 41:11-15 {S} 41:16-18 {P}

== The assassination of Gedaliah (41:1–10) ==
=== Verse 1 ===
Now it came to pass in the seventh month that Ishmael the son of Nethaniah, the son of Elishama, of the royal family and of the officers of the king, came with ten men to Gedaliah the son of Ahikam, at Mizpah. And there they ate bread together in Mizpah.

- "Family": lit. "seed"

Ishmael and his men murdered Gedaliah and others in Mizpah during a mealtime when the covenant community is celebrated and the people were less guarded.

=== Verse 2 ===
Then arose Ishmael the son of Nethaniah and the ten men that were with him, and smote Gedaliah the son of Ahikam the son of Shaphan with the sword and slew him whom the king of Babylon had made governor over the land.

- "Smote Gedaliah": The day when Gedaliah was murdered (the third day of the seventh month) was remembered as a fast day by the post-Captivity Jews (Zechariah 7:5; Zechariah 8:19), because on that day the hope of living a separate life in the promised land vanished, and the murder was likely avenged by a third deportation of Jews as mentioned in Jeremiah 52:30.

== Johanan rescues the captives (41:11–18) ==
=== Verse 16 ===
Then Johanan the son of Kareah, and all the captains of the forces that were with him, took from Mizpah all the rest of the people whom he had recovered from Ishmael the son of Nethaniah after he had murdered Gedaliah the son of Ahikam—the mighty men of war and the women and the children and the eunuchs, whom he had brought back from Gibeon.

Johanan led a group to defeat Ishmael at Gibeon, 5 km (3.1 mi) southwest of Mizpah (2 Samuel 2:13), freeing their captives after Ishmael and 8 others escaped to Ammon (Jeremiah 40:14).

== See also ==
- Babylon
- Bethlehem
- Gedaliah the son of Ahikam, the son of Saphan
- Ishmael son of Nethaniah
- Jerusalem
- Mizpah

- Related Bible part: Jeremiah 40, Jeremiah 42, Jeremiah 52

== Bibliography ==
- Coogan, Michael David (2007). Coogan, Michael David; Brettler, Marc Zvi; Newsom, Carol Ann; Perkins, Pheme (eds.). The New Oxford Annotated Bible with the Apocryphal/Deuterocanonical Books: New Revised Standard Version, Issue 48 (Augmented 3rd ed.). Oxford University Press. ISBN 9780195288810.
- Huey, F. B. (1993). The New American Commentary - Jeremiah, Lamentations: An Exegetical and Theological Exposition of Holy Scripture, NIV Text. B&H Publishing Group. ISBN 9780805401165.
- O'Connor, Kathleen M. (2007). "23. Jeremiah". In Barton, John; Muddiman, John (eds.). The Oxford Bible Commentary (first (paperback) ed.). Oxford University Press. pp. 487–533. ISBN 978-0199277186.
- Thompson, J. A. (1980). A Book of Jeremiah. The New International Commentary on the Old Testament (illustrated, revised ed.). Wm. B. Eerdmans Publishing. ISBN 9780802825308.
- Würthwein, Ernst (1995). The Text of the Old Testament. Translated by Rhodes, Erroll F. Grand Rapids, MI: Wm. B. Eerdmans. ISBN 0-8028-0788-7.
