= Jeremiah 42 =

Book of Jeremiah, chapter 42

- ← chapter 41 chapter 43 →
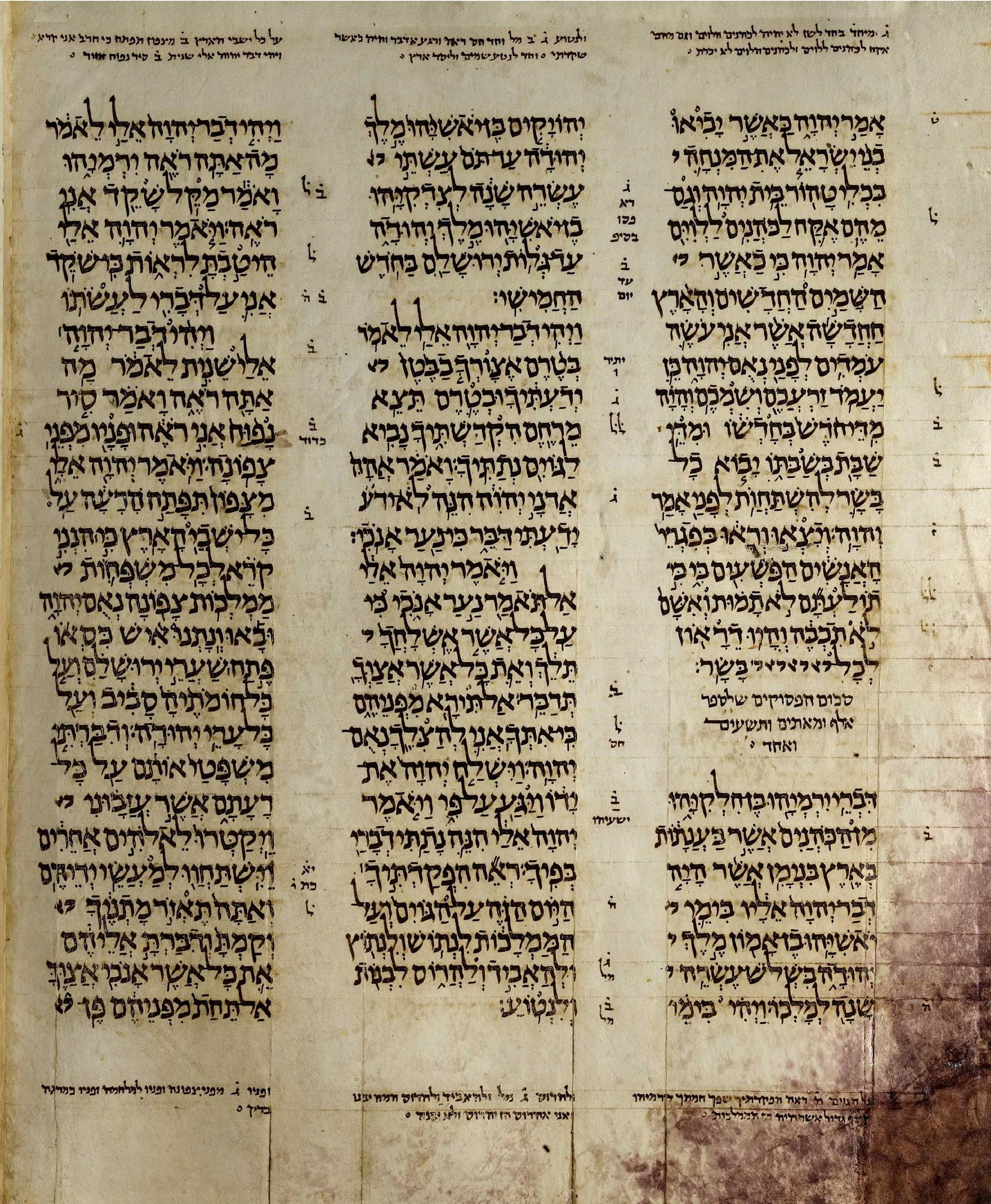
- A high resolution scan of the Aleppo Codex showing the Book of Jeremiah (the sixth book in Nevi'im).
- Book: Book of Jeremiah
- Hebrew Bible part: Nevi'im
- Order in the Hebrew part: 6
- Category: Latter Prophets
- Christian Bible part: Old Testament
- Order in the Christian part: 24

Jeremiah 42 is the forty-second chapter of the Book of Jeremiah in the Hebrew Bible or the Old Testament of the Christian Bible. This book contains prophecies attributed to the prophet Jeremiah, and is one of the Books of the Prophets. This chapter is part of a narrative section consisting of chapters 37 to 44. Chapters 42-44 describe the emigration to Egypt involving the remnant who remained in Judah after much of the population was exiled to Babylon. In this chapter, the leaders of the community ask Jeremiah to seek divine guidance as to whether they should go to Egypt or remain in Judah, but they are found to be hypocrites in asking for advice which they intended to ignore.

== Text ==
The original text was written in Hebrew. This chapter is divided into 22 verses.

=== Textual witnesses ===
Some early manuscripts containing the text of this chapter in Hebrew are of the Masoretic Text tradition, which includes the Codex Cairensis (895), the Petersburg Codex of the Prophets (916), Aleppo Codex (10th century), Codex Leningradensis (1008). Some fragments containing parts of this chapter were found among the Dead Sea Scrolls, i.e., 2QJer (2Q13; 1st century CE), with extant verses 7‑11, 14.

There is also a translation into Koine Greek known as the Septuagint (with a different chapter and verse numbering), made in the last few centuries BCE. Extant ancient manuscripts of the Septuagint version include Codex Vaticanus (B; $\mathfrak{G}$^{B}; 4th century), Codex Sinaiticus (S; BHK: $\mathfrak{G}$^{S}; 4th century), Codex Alexandrinus (A; $\mathfrak{G}$^{A}; 5th century) and Codex Marchalianus (Q; $\mathfrak{G}$^{Q}; 6th century).

=== Verse numbering ===
The order of chapters and verses of the Book of Jeremiah in the English Bibles, Masoretic Text (Hebrew), and Vulgate (Latin), in some places differs from that in the Septuagint (LXX, the Greek Bible used in the Eastern Orthodox Church and others) according to Rahlfs or Brenton. The following table is taken with minor adjustments from Brenton's Septuagint, page 971.

The order of Computer Assisted Tools for Septuagint/Scriptural Study (CATSS) based on Alfred Rahlfs' Septuaginta (1935) differs in some details from Joseph Ziegler's critical edition (1957) in Göttingen LXX. Swete's Introduction mostly agrees with Rahlfs' edition (=CATSS).

Hebrew, Vulgate, English	Rahlfs' LXX (CATSS)
42:1-22	49:1-22
35:1-19	42:1-19

== Parashot ==
The parashah sections listed here are based on the Aleppo Codex. Jeremiah 42 is a part of the "Sixteenth prophecy (Jeremiah 40-45)" in the section of Prophecies interwoven with narratives about the prophet's life (Jeremiah 26-45). {P}: open parashah; {S}: closed parashah.

{P} 42:1-6 {P} 42:7-22 {S}

== Verses 1-6 ==
The survivors of Ishmael's rebellion came to Jeremiah, who might be among the captives freed by Johanan and his forces (Jeremiah 41:16), requesting him to intercede and ask God's will on their behalf, as they were uncertain what to do.

=== Verse 3 ===
"that the Lord your God may show us the way in which we should walk and the thing we should do."

The people sought Jeremiah for advice with regard to their plan to escape to Egypt.

== Verse 10b ==
New King James Version:

... For I relent concerning the disaster that I have brought upon you.

Alternative interpretations include:

- King James Version, American Standard Version: I repent me of the evil that I have done unto you.
- Amplified Bible: I will relent and be satisfied concerning the disaster that I have inflicted on you [as discipline, and I will replace judgment with compassion].
- Jerusalem Bible: I am sorry for the evil I have done you.
- Oxford Bible Commentary: YHWH grieves over the disaster 'I . . . brought upon you'.

Biblical commentator A. W. Streane describes the King James Version's wording as "an anthropomorphic figure", as if God's intention was to change conduct towards the people of Judah, "which with men is commonly caused by change of purpose".

== See also ==
- Babylon
- Egypt
- Ishmael son of Nethaniah
- Jerusalem
- Related Bible part: Jeremiah 41, Jeremiah 43, Jeremiah 44

== Bibliography ==
- Coogan, Michael David (2007). Coogan, Michael David; Brettler, Marc Zvi; Newsom, Carol Ann; Perkins, Pheme (eds.). The New Oxford Annotated Bible with the Apocryphal/Deuterocanonical Books: New Revised Standard Version, Issue 48 (Augmented 3rd ed.). Oxford University Press. ISBN 9780195288810.
- Huey, F. B. (1993). The New American Commentary - Jeremiah, Lamentations: An Exegetical and Theological Exposition of Holy Scripture, NIV Text. B&H Publishing Group. ISBN 9780805401165.
- O'Connor, Kathleen M. (2007). "23. Jeremiah". In Barton, John; Muddiman, John (eds.). The Oxford Bible Commentary (first (paperback) ed.). Oxford University Press. pp. 487–533. ISBN 978-0199277186.
- Thompson, J. A. (1980). A Book of Jeremiah. The New International Commentary on the Old Testament (illustrated, revised ed.). Wm. B. Eerdmans Publishing. ISBN 9780802825308.
- Würthwein, Ernst (1995). The Text of the Old Testament. Translated by Rhodes, Erroll F. Grand Rapids, MI: Wm. B. Eerdmans. ISBN 0-8028-0788-7.
