= Jeremiah 44 =

Book of Jeremiah, chapter 44

- ← chapter 43 chapter 45 →
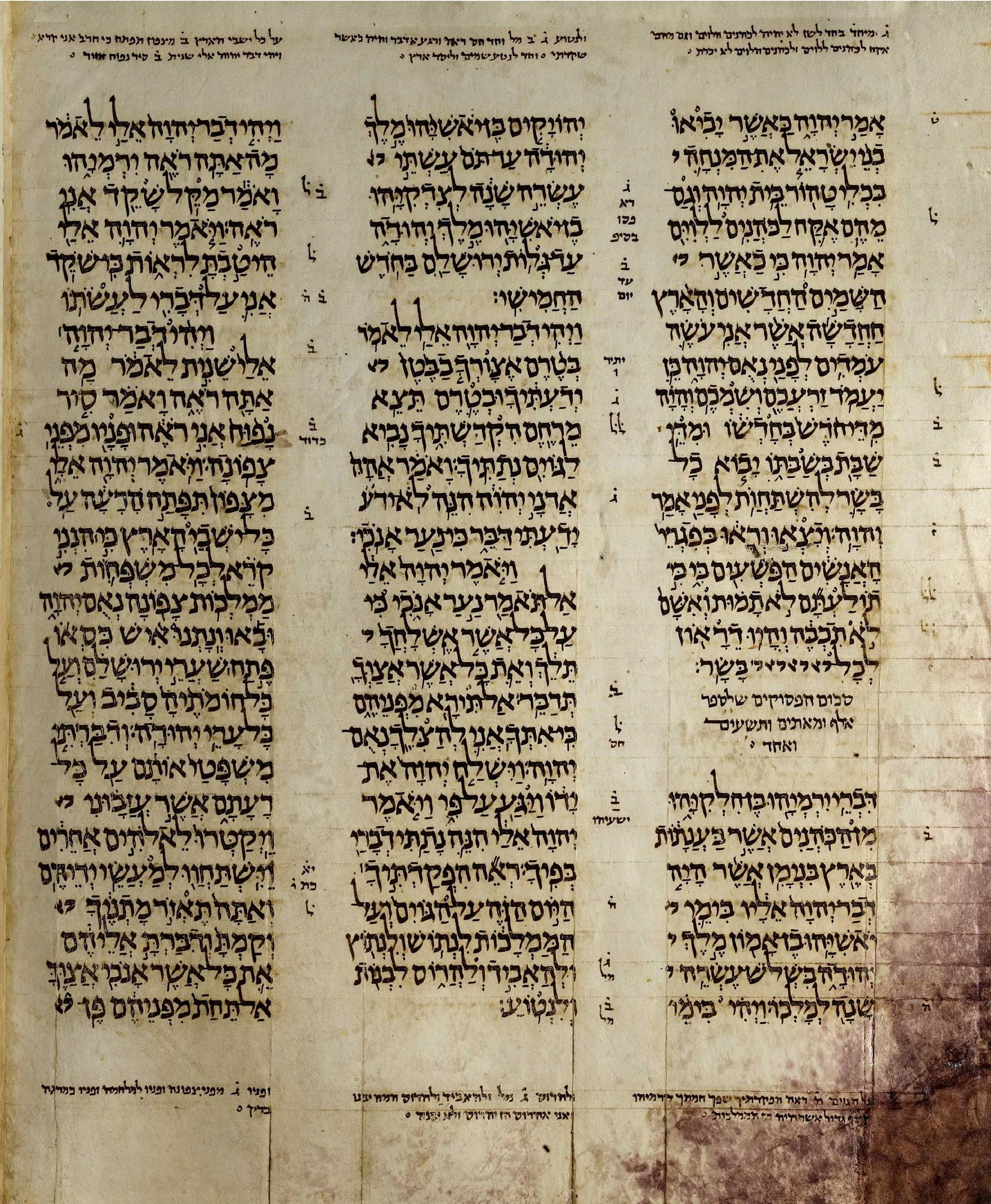
- A high resolution scan of the Aleppo Codex showing the Book of Jeremiah (the sixth book in Nevi'im).
- Book: Book of Jeremiah
- Hebrew Bible part: Nevi'im
- Order in the Hebrew part: 6
- Category: Latter Prophets
- Christian Bible part: Old Testament
- Order in the Christian part: 24

Jeremiah 44 is the forty-fourth chapter of the Book of Jeremiah in the Hebrew Bible or the Old Testament of the Christian Bible. This book contains prophecies attributed to the prophet Jeremiah, and is one of the Books of the Prophets. This chapter is part of a narrative section consisting of chapters 37 to the present one. Chapters 42-44 describe the emigration to Egypt involving the remnant who remained in Judah after much of the population was exiled to Babylon. The Jerusalem Bible describes this chapter as "the last episode of Jeremiah's ministry".

== Text ==
The original text was written in Hebrew. This chapter is divided into 30 verses.

=== Textual witnesses ===
Some ancient manuscripts containing the text of this chapter in Hebrew are of the Masoretic Text tradition, which includes the Codex Cairensis (895), the Petersburg Codex of the Prophets (916), Aleppo Codex (10th century), Codex Leningradensis (1008). Some fragments containing parts of this chapter were found among the Dead Sea Scrolls, i.e., 2QJer (2Q13; 1st century CE), with extant verses 1‑3, 12‑14.

There is also a translation into Koine Greek known as the Septuagint (with a different chapter and verse numbering), made in the last few centuries BCE. Extant ancient manuscripts of the Septuagint version include Codex Vaticanus (B; $\mathfrak{G}$^{B}; 4th century), Codex Sinaiticus (S; BHK: $\mathfrak{G}$^{S}; 4th century), Codex Alexandrinus (A; $\mathfrak{G}$^{A}; 5th century) and Codex Marchalianus (Q; $\mathfrak{G}$^{Q}; 6th century).

== Parashot ==
The parashah sections (weekly Torah portion in Judaism) listed here are based on the Aleppo Codex. Jeremiah 44 is a part of the "Sixteenth prophecy (Jeremiah 40-45)" in the section of Prophecies interwoven with narratives about the prophet's life (Jeremiah 26-45). {P}: open parashah; {S}: closed parashah.

{P} 44:1-6 {S} 44:7-10 {S} 44:11-14 {P} 44:15-19 {S} 44:20-23 {S} 44:24-25 {S} 44:26-29 {P} 44:30 {S}

== Verse numbering ==
The order of chapters and verses of the Book of Jeremiah in the English Bibles, Masoretic Text (Hebrew), and Vulgate (Latin), in some places differs from that in the Septuagint (LXX, the Greek Bible used in the Eastern Orthodox Church and others) according to Rahlfs or Brenton. The following table is taken with minor adjustments from Brenton's Septuagint, page 971.

The order of Computer Assisted Tools for Septuagint/Scriptural Study (CATSS) based on Alfred Rahlfs' Septuaginta (1935) differs in some details from Joseph Ziegler's critical edition (1957) in Göttingen LXX. Swete's Introduction mostly agrees with Rahlfs' edition (=CATSS).

Hebrew, Vulgate, English	Rahlfs' LXX (CATSS)
44:1-30	51:1-30
37:1-21	44:1-21

== Verse 1 ==
The word that came to Jeremiah concerning all the Jews which dwell in the land of Egypt, which dwell at Migdol, and at Tahpanhes, and at Noph, and in the country of Pathros, saying, (KJV)

This is Jeremiah's final message to the Judeans living in various places in Egypt, and therefore the Jerusalem Bible suggests that this introduction to Jeremiah's final prophecy "represents [a] discourse as addressed to the whole Jewish diaspora in Egypt".

- "Tahpanhes": was the border point first reach by the migrant community coming from occupied Judah (Jeremiah 43:7).
- "Noph": the same as Memphis, in Lower Egypt.
- "Pathros": refers to Upper Egypt (southern Egypt).

== Verse 30 ==
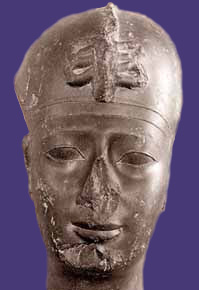
The head of Hophra (Apries), Louvre.

"Thus says the Lord: 'Behold, I will give Pharaoh Hophra king of Egypt into the hand of his enemies and into the hand of those who seek his life, as I gave Zedekiah king of Judah into the hand of Nebuchadnezzar king of Babylon, his enemy who sought his life.'" (KJV)

The same way Yahweh handed Zedekiah over to Nebuchadnezzar II (Jeremiah 39:5–7), Pharaoh Hophra (or Apries) (Hebrew: חפרע Ḥāp̄əra‘) would be handed over to his enemies. Hophra is the fourth king (counting from Psamtik I) of the Twenty-sixth dynasty of Egypt, ruling 589-570 BCE. His name is written as Ουαφρη[ς], Ouaphre[s] in the Greek Old Testament, Ancient Greek: Ἁπρίης Apries by Herodotus (ii. 161) and Diodorus (i. 68), or Waphres by Manetho, who correctly records that he reigned for 19 years. He forged an alliance with Zedekiah to rebel against Babylon (Jeremiah 37:5), sending an army in the summer of 588 BC, but that action failed to prevent the fall of Jerusalem in July 587 BCE. In 570 BC Hophra was forced to rule together as co-regents with Amasis (or Ahmosis/Ahmose II), but three years later Hophra was overthrown and executed, while Amasis continued to be a sole ruler until his death in 526 BCE.

== See also ==
- Egypt
- Israel
- Jerusalem
- Migdol
- Nebuchadrezzar king of Babylon
- Noph
- Pathros
- Pharaoh Hophra king of Egypt
- Tahpanhes
- Zedekiah king of Judah
- Related Bible part: Jeremiah 42, Jeremiah 43, Jeremiah 45

== Sources ==
- Coogan, Michael David (2007). Coogan, Michael David; Brettler, Marc Zvi; Newsom, Carol Ann; Perkins, Pheme (eds.). The New Oxford Annotated Bible with the Apocryphal/Deuterocanonical Books: New Revised Standard Version, Issue 48 (Augmented 3rd ed.). Oxford University Press. ISBN 9780195288810.
- Huey, F. B. (1993). The New American Commentary - Jeremiah, Lamentations: An Exegetical and Theological Exposition of Holy Scripture, NIV Text. B&H Publishing Group. ISBN 9780805401165.
- O'Connor, Kathleen M. (2007). "23. Jeremiah". In Barton, John; Muddiman, John (eds.). The Oxford Bible Commentary (first (paperback) ed.). Oxford University Press. pp. 487–533. ISBN 978-0199277186.
- Thompson, J. A. (1980). A Book of Jeremiah. The New International Commentary on the Old Testament (illustrated, revised ed.). Wm. B. Eerdmans Publishing. ISBN 9780802825308.
- Würthwein, Ernst (1995). The Text of the Old Testament. Translated by Rhodes, Erroll F. Grand Rapids, MI: Wm. B. Eerdmans. ISBN 0-8028-0788-7.
