= Apries =

Egyptian pharaoh

- Wahibre
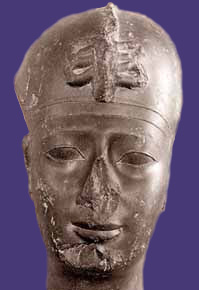
- head of Apries, Louvre

Pharaoh
- Reign: 589-570 BCE
- Predecessor: Psamtik II
- Successor: Amasis II
Royal titulary
Horus name
Wahib
Wꜣḫ jb
He whose heart is constant
G5	wAH ib
Prenomen
Haaibre
Ḥꜥꜥ jb rꜥ
Jubilant is the Heart of Re Forever

M23 X1 L2 X1	ra H a a ib
Nomen
Wahibre
Wꜣḫ jb rꜥ
Constant is the Heart of Re

G39 N5	ra wAH ib
- Children: Khedebneithirbinet II
- Father: Psamtik II
- Mother: Takhuit
- Died: March 567 BCE
- Dynasty: 26th dynasty

Apries (Ancient Greek: Ἁπρίης) is the name by which Herodotus and Diodorus designate Wahibre Haaibre, a pharaoh of Egypt (589–570 BCE), the fourth king (counting from Psamtik I) of the Twenty-sixth dynasty of Egypt. He was equated with the Ouaphris (Οὔαφρις) of Manetho, who correctly records that he reigned for 19 years. Apries is also called Hophra in Jeremiah 44:30 (Hebrew: חָפְרַע, Modern: Ḥofra', Tiberian: H̱op̄ra'; Ancient Greek: Ουαφρη[ς], romanized: Ouaphre[s]).

== Biography ==
Apries inherited the throne from his father, pharaoh Psamtik II, in February 589 BCE. Apries was an active builder who constructed "additions to the temples at Athribis (Tell Atrib), Bahariya Oasis, Memphis and Sais." In the 4th year of his reign, Apries' sister Ankhnesneferibre was made the new God's Wife of Amun at Thebes. However, Apries' reign was also fraught with internal problems. In 588 BCE, Apries dispatched a force to Jerusalem to protect it from Babylonian forces sent by Nebuchadnezzar II (Book of Jeremiah 37:5; 34:21). His forces quickly withdrew, however, apparently avoiding a major confrontation with the Babylonians. Jerusalem, following an 18 month-long siege, was destroyed by the Babylonians in either 587 or 586 BCE. Apries's unsuccessful attempt to intervene in the politics of the Kingdom of Judah was followed by a mutiny of soldiers from the strategically important Aswan garrison.

According to classical historians, Apries campaigned in the Levant, took Sidon and so terrified the other cities of Phoenicia that he secured their submission. However, this supposed submission was likely short lived. A recently uncovered stela from Tahpanhes records that Nebuchadnezzar II attempted to invade Egypt in 582 BCE, but Apries' forces were capable to repel the invasion.

In Cyrenaica to the west, Battus II of Cyrene had encouraged further Greek settlement in his city, especially from the Peloponnese and Crete. This sparked conflict with the indigenous Libyans, whose king Adicran appealed to Apries for help around 570 BCE. Apries launched a military expedition against Cyrene, but was decisively defeated at the Battle of Irasa.

When the defeated army returned home, a civil war broke out in the Egyptian army between the indigenous troops and the foreign mercenaries. The Egyptians threw their support to Amasis II, a general who had led Egyptian forces in a highly successful invasion of Nubia in 592 BCE under Pharaoh Psamtik II, Apries' father. Amasis quickly declared himself pharaoh in 570 BCE, and Apries fled Egypt and sought refuge in a foreign country. When Apries marched back to Egypt in 567 BCE with the aid of a Babylonian army to reclaim the throne of Egypt, he was likely killed in battle with Amasis' forces. (Note: Shaw & Nicholson write that Apries "probably died in battle in 567 BC".) Alternatively, Herodotus holds that Apries survived the battle, and was captured and treated well by the victorious Amasis, until the Egyptian people demanded justice against him, whereby he was placed into their hands and strangled to death. Amasis thus secured his kingship over Egypt and was then its unchallenged ruler.

Amasis, however, reportedly treated Apries' mortal remains with respect and observed the proper funerary rituals by having Apries' body carried to Sais and buried there with "full military honours." Amasis, the former general who had declared himself pharaoh, also married Apries' daughter, Khedebneithirbinet II, to legitimise his accession to power. While Herodotus claimed that the wife of Apries was called Nitetis (Νιτῆτις, in Greek), "there are no contemporary references naming her" in Egyptian records.

Eusebius placed the eclipse of Thales in 585 BCE, in the eighth or twelfth year of Apries' reign.

== Monuments ==
An obelisk which Apries erected at Sais was moved by the 3rd century AD Roman Emperor Diocletian and originally placed at the Temple of Isis in Rome. It is today located in front of the Santa Maria sopra Minerva basilica church in Rome.

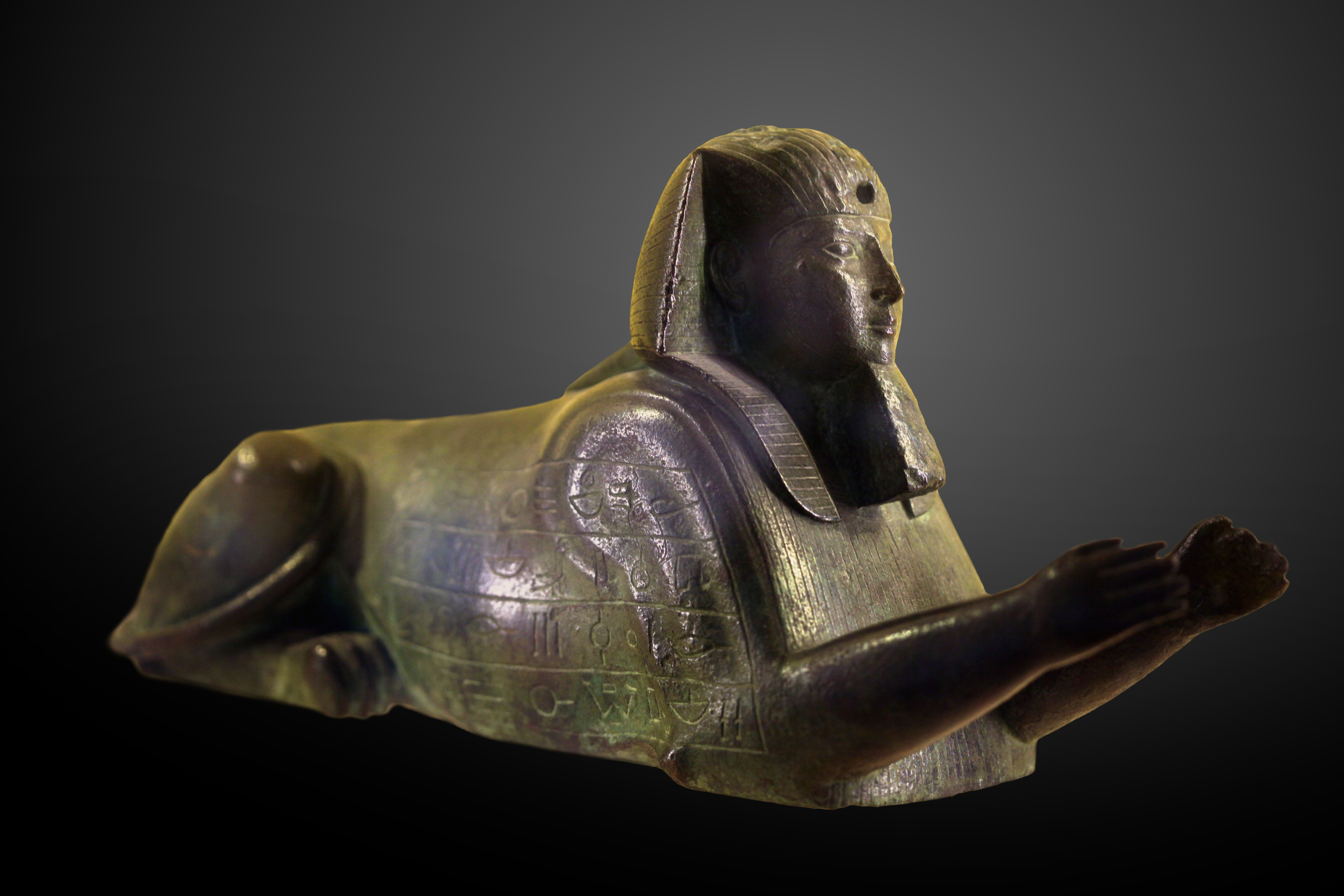
Sphinx of Pharaoh Apries, from the collection of Count Caylus, now in the Louvre Museum

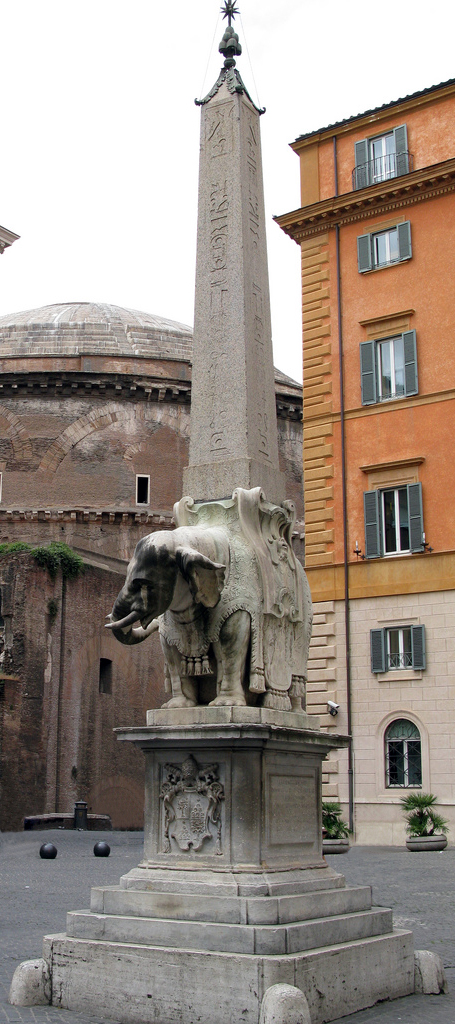
Apries' obelisk in Rome is known as the Pulcino della Minerva

== See also ==
- Twenty-sixth Dynasty of Egypt family tree
- List of biblical figures identified in extra-biblical sources
