= Jeremiah 27 =

Book of Jeremiah, chapter 27

- ← chapter 26 chapter 28 →
- A high resolution scan of the Aleppo Codex showing the Book of Jeremiah (the sixth book in Nevi'im).
- Book: Book of Jeremiah
- Hebrew Bible part: Nevi'im
- Order in the Hebrew part: 6
- Category: Latter Prophets
- Christian Bible part: Old Testament
- Order in the Christian part: 24

Jeremiah 27 is the twenty-seventh chapter of the Book of Jeremiah in the Hebrew Bible or the Old Testament of the Christian Bible. The material found in Jeremiah 27 is found in Jeremiah 34 in the Septuagint, which orders some material differently. This book contains prophecies attributed to the prophet Jeremiah, and is one of the Books of the Prophets. The New American Bible (Revised Edition) (NABRE) describes chapters 27-29 as "a special collection of Jeremiah’s prophecies dealing with false prophets", and suggests that "stylistic peculiarities evident in the Hebrew suggest that these three chapters once existed as an independent work".

== Text ==
The original text was written in Hebrew language. This chapter is divided into 22 verses.

=== Textual witnesses ===
Some early manuscripts containing the text of this chapter in Hebrew are of the Masoretic Text tradition, which includes the Codex Cairensis (895), the Petersburg Codex of the Prophets (916), Aleppo Codex (10th century), Codex Leningradensis (1008). Some fragments containing parts of this chapter were found among the Dead Sea Scrolls, i.e., 4QJer^{c} (4Q72; 1st century BC), with extant verses 1‑3, 13‑15 (similar to Masoretic Text).

There is also a translation into Koine Greek known as the Septuagint (with a different chapter and verse numbering), made in the last few centuries BCE. Extant ancient manuscripts of the Septuagint version include Codex Vaticanus (B; $\mathfrak{G}$^{B}; 4th century), Codex Sinaiticus (S; BHK: $\mathfrak{G}$^{S}; 4th century), Codex Alexandrinus (A; $\mathfrak{G}$^{A}; 5th century) and Codex Marchalianus (Q; $\mathfrak{G}$^{Q}; 6th century).

== Parashot ==
The parashah sections listed here are based on the Aleppo Codex. Jeremiah 27 is a part of the Tenth prophecy (Jeremiah 26-29) in the section of Prophecies interwoven with narratives about the prophet's life (Jeremiah 26-45). {P}: open parashah; {S}: closed parashah.

{P} 27:1-22 {P}

== Verse numbering ==
The order of chapters and verses of the Book of Jeremiah in the English Bibles, Masoretic Text (Hebrew), and Vulgate (Latin), in some places differs from that in Septuagint (LXX, the Greek Bible used in the Eastern Orthodox Church and others) according to Rahlfs or Brenton. The following table is taken with minor adjustments from Brenton's Septuagint, page 971.

The order of Computer Assisted Tools for Septuagint/Scriptural Study (CATSS) based on Alfred Rahlfs' Septuaginta (1935), differs in some details from Joseph Ziegler's critical edition (1957) in Göttingen LXX. Swete's Introduction mostly agrees with Rahlfs' edition (=CATSS).

| Hebrew, Vulgate, English | Rahlfs' LXX (CATSS) |
|---|---|
| 27:1,7,13,17,21 | none |
| 27:2-6,8-12,14-16,18-20,22 | 34:2-6,8-12,14-16,18-20,22 |
| 50:1-46 | 27:1-46 |

== Verse 1 ==
In the beginning of the reign of Jehoiakim the son of Josiah, king of Judah, this word came to Jeremiah from the Lord, saying

This verse is absent from the Septuagint. In place of Jehoiakim, the English Standard Version, NABRE, New International Version and Revised Standard Version refer to Zedekiah. The New American Bible (Revised Edition) advises that "the Hebrew text actually has “Jehoiakim”, but the content of the chapter indicates that Zedekiah is intended.

== Verses 2–3 ==
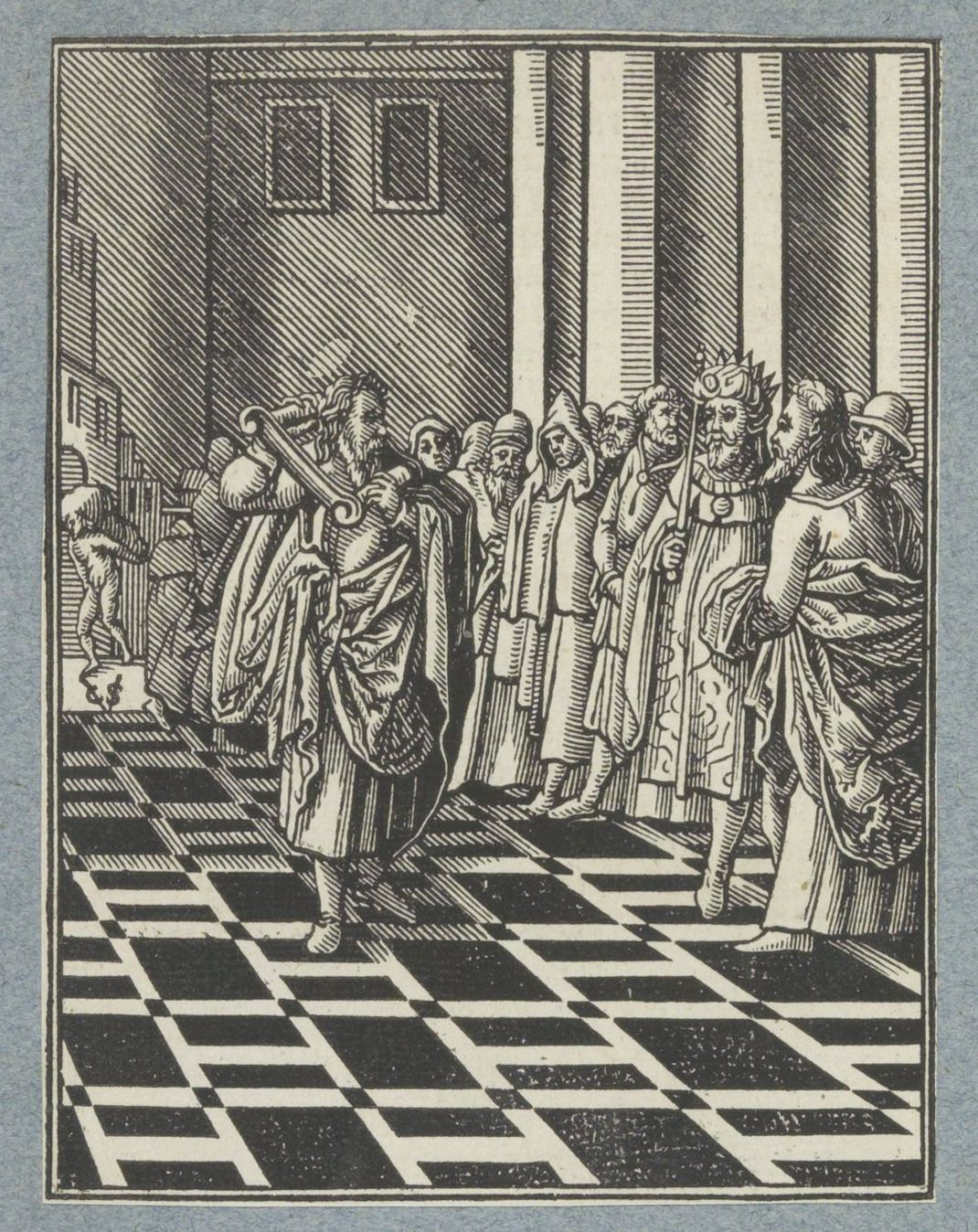
"Jeremiah appears before King Zedekiah with a wooden yoke" (Jeremiah 27-28). Christoffel van Sichem (1645-1646)

^{2}"Thus says the Lord to me:

'Make for yourselves bonds and yokes, and put them on your neck,
^{3}and send them to the king of Edom, the king of Moab, the king of the Ammonites, the king of Tyre, and the king of Sidon,
by the hand of the messengers who come to Jerusalem to Zedekiah king of Judah.'"

- "Bonds and yokes": that is, 'the bands which secured the two pieces of wood placed respectively above and beneath the neck of the ox, so forming a yoke' (cf. Leviticus 26:13 "the poles of your yoke"); Jeremiah 28:10 indicates that this account is to be taken literally.

== Verse 16 ==
Also I spoke to the priests and to all this people, saying,

"Thus says the Lord:
'Do not listen to the words of your prophets who prophesy to you, saying,

"Behold, the vessels of the Lord’s house will now shortly be brought back from Babylon";

for they prophesy a lie to you.'"

== Verse 22 ==
'They shall be carried to Babylon, and there they shall be until the day that I visit them,’
says the Lord.
‘Then I will bring them up and restore them to this place.'

- The pillars of the temple, named Boaz and Jachin (1 Kings 7:15–22), the large copper basin called "the sea" (1 Kings 7:23–26), the stands and vessels (1 Kings 7:27–39) would be carried to Babylon in 586 BC, when Jerusalem fell, but the vessels were later returned intact by king Cyrus in 538-535 BC (Ezra 1:7–11).

== See also ==
- Ammon
- Babylon
- Edom
- Jeconiah
- Jehoiakim
- Jeremiah
- Jerusalem
- Josiah
- Judah
- Moab
- Nebuchadnezzar
- Sidon
- Tyre
- Zedekiah
- Related Bible parts: 1 Kings 7, 2 Kings 24, Ezra 1, Daniel 1, Daniel 5

== Bibliography ==
- Ulrich, Eugene, ed. (2010). The Biblical Qumran Scrolls: Transcriptions and Textual Variants. Brill.
- Würthwein, Ernst (1995). The Text of the Old Testament. Translated by Rhodes, Erroll F. Grand Rapids, MI: Wm. B. Eerdmans. ISBN 978-0-8028-0788-5.
