= Hoshaiah =

Hoshaiah (Hebrew: הוֹשַׁעְיָה) is a biblical name mentioned in Jeremiah 42:1, 43:2, and Nehemiah 12:32. Notable people with this name include:

- Hoshaiah Rabbah (c. 200), an amora (Jewish scholar) of the first generation
- Hoshaiah II (died c. 350), an amora of the third and fourth generations

== See also ==
- Hoshaya, a community settlement in northern Israel
- Abba Hoshaya of Turya, a 3rd-century pious Jewish wool-washer
