= P.Bodl. MS bibl. Gr. 5 =

Septuagint manuscript

P.Bodl. MS bibl. Gr. 5 (Rahlfs no. 2082, TM 61926) is a septuagint manuscript of the biblical book of Psalms. The manuscript has been dated to the second century CE, or even later.

== Description ==
The manuscript contains Psalms 48-49 according to the LXX: xlviii(xlix).20–49; xlix(l).17–21.

== Location ==
It is currently housed in the Bodleian Library in Oxford.

== Sources ==
- Digital Bodleian Libraries. "MS. Gr. bib. g. 5 (P)". University of Oxford.
- Dobbs-Allsopp, F. W. (2012). Poetry of the Psalms. Princeton Theological Seminary.
- Dobbs-Allsopp, F. W. (2015). On Biblical Poetry. Oxford University Press. ISBN 9780199766901.
- Hacham, Noah; Ilan, Tal, eds. (2022). The Early-Roman Period (30 BCE–117 CE). Walter de Gruyter GmbH & Co KG. p. 148. ISBN 9783110787764.
