= Osias =

Osias is both a given name and surname from Hebrew Hoshaiah. Notable people with the name include:

- Osias Beert (1580–1623/24), Flemish painter
- Osias Godin (1911–1988), Canadian politician
- Camilo Osías (1889–1976), Filipino politician

== See also ==
- Osia Lewis (1962–2020), American football player
