= Jeremiah 28 =

Book of Jeremiah, chapter 28

- ← chapter 27 chapter 29 →
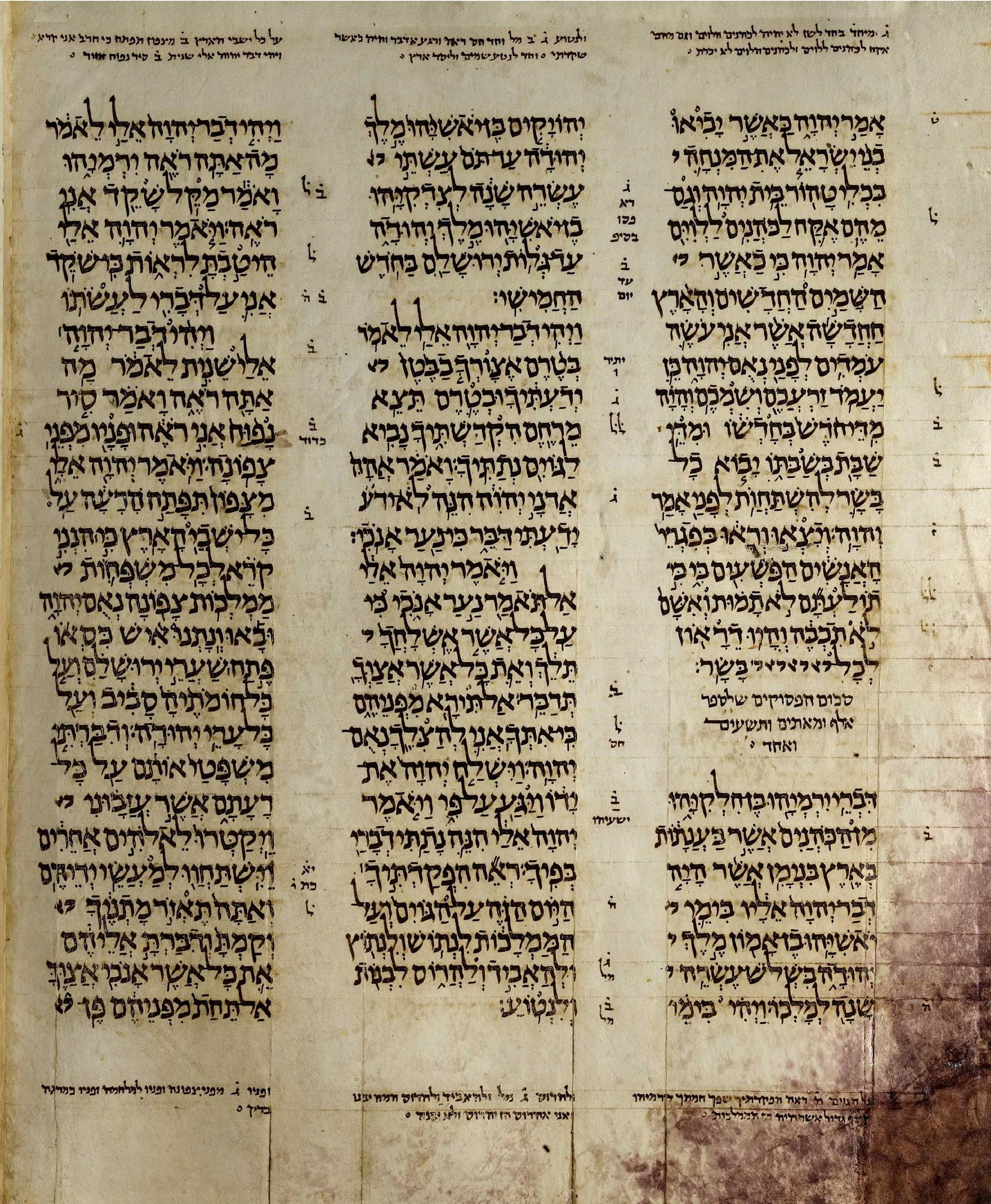
- A high resolution scan of the Aleppo Codex showing the Book of Jeremiah (the sixth book in Nevi'im).
- Book: Book of Jeremiah
- Hebrew Bible part: Nevi'im
- Order in the Hebrew part: 6
- Category: Latter Prophets
- Christian Bible part: Old Testament
- Order in the Christian part: 24

Jeremiah 28 is the twenty-eighth chapter of the Book of Jeremiah in the Hebrew Bible or the Old Testament of the Christian Bible. The material found in Jeremiah 28 of the Hebrew Bible appears in Jeremiah 35 in the Septuagint. This book contains prophecies attributed to the prophet Jeremiah, and is one of the Books of the Prophets. This chapter contains a confrontation between prophets Jeremiah and Hananiah: Hananiah's false prophecy is responded by Jeremiah's answer, Jeremiah 28:1-9. Hananiah breaks Jeremiah's yoke, Jeremiah foretells an iron yoke, and Hananiah's death, Jeremiah 28:10-17.

== Text ==
The original text of this chapter, as with the rest of the Book of Jeremiah, was written in Hebrew language. Since the division of the Bible into chapters and verses in the late medieval period, this chapter is divided into 17 verses.

=== Textual witnesses ===
Some early manuscripts containing the text of this chapter in Hebrew are of the Masoretic Text tradition, which includes the Codex Cairensis (895), the Petersburg Codex of the Prophets (916), Aleppo Codex (10th century), Codex Leningradensis (1008).

There is also a translation into Koine Greek known as the Septuagint (with a different chapter and verse numbering), made in the last few centuries BCE. Extant ancient manuscripts of the Septuagint version include Codex Vaticanus (B; $\mathfrak{G}$^{B}; 4th century), Codex Sinaiticus (S; BHK: $\mathfrak{G}$^{S}; 4th century), Codex Alexandrinus (A; $\mathfrak{G}$^{A}; 5th century) and Codex Marchalianus (Q; $\mathfrak{G}$^{Q}; 6th century).

== Parashot ==
The parashah sections listed here are based on the Aleppo Codex. Jeremiah 28 is a part of the "Tenth prophecy (Jeremiah 26-29)" in the section of "Prophecies interwoven with narratives about the prophet's life (26-45)". {P}: open parashah; {S}: closed parashah.

{P} 28:1-11 {P} 28:12-17 {P}

== Verse numbering ==
The order of chapters and verses of the Book of Jeremiah in the English Bibles, Masoretic Text (Hebrew), and Vulgate (Latin), in some places differs from that in Septuagint (LXX, the Greek Bible used in the Eastern Orthodox Church and others) according to Rahlfs or Brenton. The following table is taken with minor adjustments from Brenton's Septuagint, page 971.

The order of Computer Assisted Tools for Septuagint/Scriptural Study (CATSS) based on Alfred Rahlfs' Septuaginta (1935), differs in some details from Joseph Ziegler's critical edition (1957) in Göttingen LXX. Swete's Introduction mostly agrees with Rahlfs' edition (=CATSS).

Hebrew, Vulgate, English	Rahlfs' LXX (CATSS)
28:1-17	35:1-17
51:1-64	28:1-64

== Hananiah's false prophecy (28:1–4) ==
=== Verse 1 ===
And it happened in the same year, at the beginning of the reign of Zedekiah king of Judah, in the fourth year and in the fifth month, that Hananiah the son of Azur the prophet, who was from Gibeon, spoke to me in the house of the Lord in the presence of the priests and of all the people, saying

- Time of the event: As Zedekiah began to reign in 597 BC, the fourth year is 594/593 BC, the fifth month (Av or Ab) is July–August.
- Gibeon: a city six miles northwest of Jerusalem and about five miles west of Anathoth, Jeremiah's hometown. Like Anathoth, it was one of the cities of priests (Joshua 21:17), and Hananiah was probably, therefore, a priest as well as prophet.

=== Verse 4 ===
[Hananiah said:] "'And I will bring back to this place Jeconiah the son of Jehoiakim, king of Judah, with all the captives of Judah who went to Babylon,' says the Lord, 'for I will break the yoke of the king of Babylon.'"

- "Jeconiah": as also in Jeremiah 24:1; 29:2; abbreviated as "Coniah" in Jeremiah 22:24, 28; 37:1, assumes the throne name "Jehoiachin" (2 Kings 24:12) as king of Judah while reigning for three months and ten days until deported to Babylon in 597 BCE. His existence was attested by inscription tablets found near the Ishtar Gate of ancient Babylon (now in Iraq), dated to c. 592 BCE, mentioning his name in cuneiform (Akkadian: 𒅀𒀪𒌑𒆠𒉡, "Ia-'-ú-kinu") and his five sons as recipients of food rations in Babylon.
- "Says the Lord": from Hebrew "Oracle of the Lord", a formula used by the prophets to declare the message from God (cf. Jeremiah 27:22), here is imitated by a "false" prophet.

== Jeremiah’s response to Hananiah (28:5–9) ==
=== Verses 8–9 ===
[Jeremiah said:] "^{8}The prophets who have been before me and before you of old prophesied against many countries and great kingdoms—of war and disaster and pestilence.
^{9}As for the prophet who prophesies of peace, when the word of the prophet comes to pass, the prophet will be known as one whom the Lord has truly sent."

- "Prophesies… comes to pass": The Hebrew verbs in this verse should be regarded as 'iterative imperfects in past time' ("prophesied… came to pass"), rather than as 'futures', because of the emphatic syntactical construction showing explicit contrast between verses 8 and 9 (these verses start with a 'casus pendens construction' for the contrast; in Hebrew "The prophets who were before me and you from ancient times, they prophesied…").

== Hananiah breaks Jeremiah’s yoke (28:10–11) ==
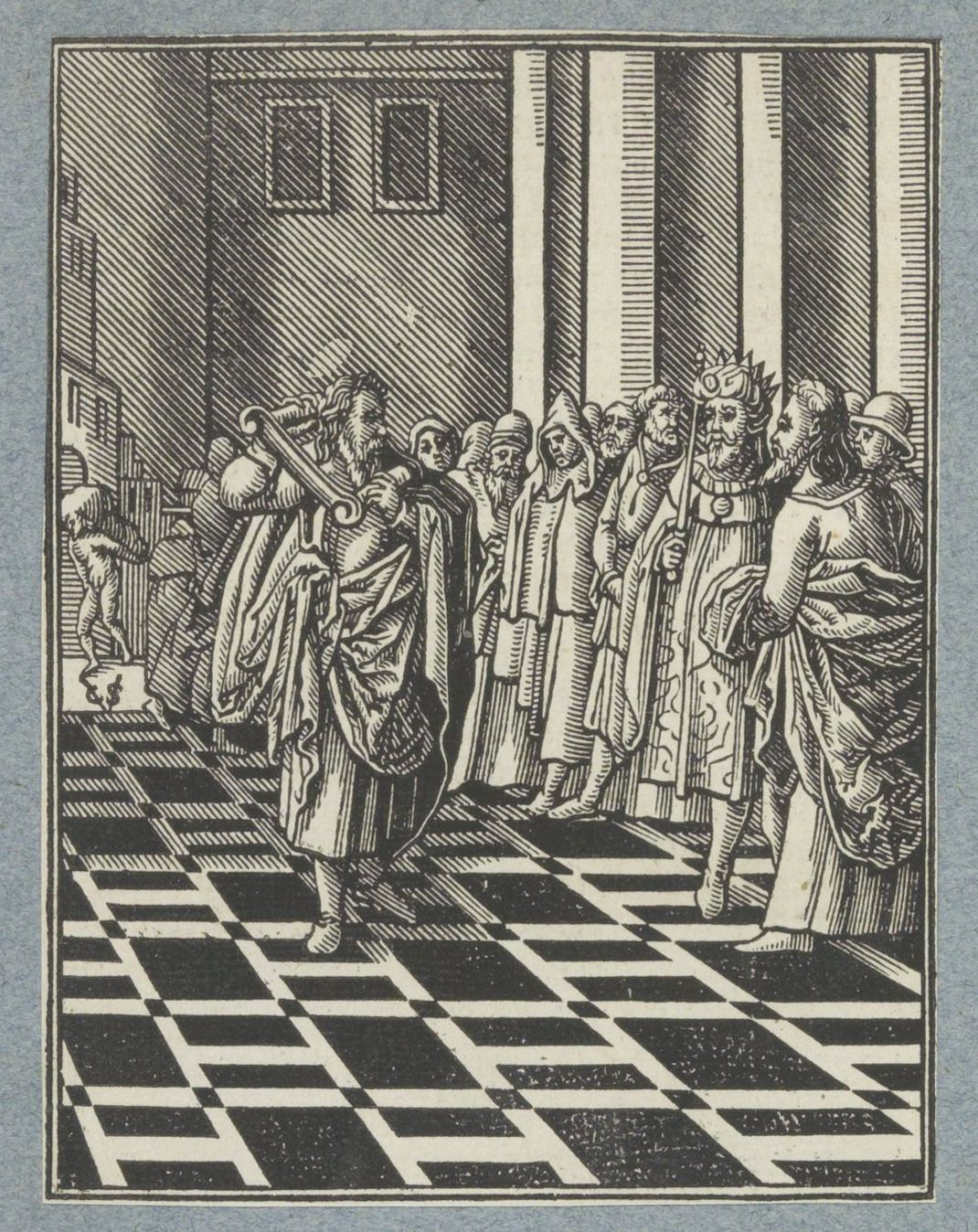
"Jeremiah appears before King Zedekiah with a wooden yoke" (Jeremiah 27-28). Christoffel van Sichem (1645-1646)

=== Verse 11 ===
And Hananiah spoke in the presence of all the people, saying, "Thus says the Lord: 'Even so I will break the yoke of Nebuchadnezzar king of Babylon from the neck of all nations within the space of two full years.'" And the prophet Jeremiah went his way.

A marginal note in the Masoretic Text tradition indicates that this is the middle verse of the Book of Jeremiah in Hebrew.

== The Lord’s Word against Hananiah (28:12–17) ==
=== Verse 16 ===
[Jeremiah said:] "Therefore thus says the Lord: 'Behold, I will cast you from the face of the earth. This year you shall die, because you have taught rebellion against the Lord.'"

- "You": refers to Hananiah who is exposed by Jeremiah to be a false prophet, so Hananiah will die as punishment from God; this is in accordance to Deuteronomy 13:5:

But that prophet or that dreamer of dreams shall be put to death, because he has spoken in order to turn you away from the Lord your God, who brought you out of the land of Egypt and redeemed you from the house of bondage, to entice you from the way in which the Lord your God commanded you to walk. So you shall put away the evil from your midst.

and Deuteronomy 18:20:

the prophet who presumes to speak a word in My name, which I have not commanded him to speak, or who speaks in the name of other gods, that prophet shall die.

=== Verse 17 ===
So Hananiah the prophet died the same year in the seventh month.

- "Seventh month": two months after Hananiah gave the false prophecy (see Jeremiah 28:1), and the subsequent events of 588 BC would validate Jeremiah’s prophecies and invalidate those of Hananiah.

== See also ==
- Babylon
- Hananiah the son of Azur
- Israel
- Jeconiah
- Jehoiakim
- Jerusalem
- Nebuchadnezzar
- Judah
- Related Bible parts: Deuteronomy 18, Ezekiel 33.

== Sources ==
- Sweeney, Marvin (2007). I & II Kings: A Commentary. Westminster John Knox Press. ISBN 978-0-664-22084-6.
- Würthwein, Ernst (1995). The Text of the Old Testament. Translated by Rhodes, Erroll F. Grand Rapids, MI: Wm. B. Eerdmans. ISBN 0-8028-0788-7.
