= Noph =

Noph or Moph was the Hebrew name for the ancient Egyptian city of Memphis, capital of Lower Egypt, which stood on the Nile near the site of modern-day Cairo. It is mentioned several times in the Hebrew Bible (Isaiah 19:13; Jeremiah 2:16; 44:1; 46:14, 19; Ezekiel. 30:13, 16).

Hosea 9:6 uses the older version Moph (e.g. in Young's Literal Translation) although many English translations use the name Memphis in this verse
