= Tahpanhes =

Tahpanhes Tehaphnehes Daphnae, Taphnas (ancient Greek) Tell Defenneh
- Ancient city
- Location in Egypt
- Coordinates: 30°51′38″N 32°10′17″E
- Country: Egypt
- Time zone: UTC+2 (EST)
  - Summer (DST): +3

Tahpanhes or Tehaphnehes (Phoenician: 𐤕𐤇𐤐𐤍𐤇[𐤎], romanized: tḥpnḥ[s]; Hebrew: תַּחְפַּנְחֵס, romanized: Taḥpanḥēs or Hebrew: תְּחַפְנְחֵס, romanized: Tǝḥafnǝḥēs (Note: The Masoretic Text uses the prior spelling in all occurrences except Ez. 30:18, where the latter is found.)), known by the ancient Greeks as the (Pelusian) Daphnae (Ancient Greek: Δάφναι αἱ Πηλούσιαι) and in the Septuagint as Taphnas (Ταφνας/αις), now Tell Defenneh, was a city in ancient Egypt. It was located on Lake Manzala on the Tanitic branch of the Nile, about 26 km (16 miles) from Pelusium. The site is now situated on the Suez Canal.

== Name ==
The meaning of the name remains uncertain although it appears to be of an Egyptian origin. Biblical scholar John L. McKenzie refers the name to T-h-p-nhsj meaning Fortress of the Nubian, while William Albright adds it means Fortress of Pinehas. Herodotus calls it "Daphnae of Pelusion", and claims it was a fortress against the "Arabians and Assyrians". Daressy and Spiegelberg connect the name with the hieroglyphic word Tephen.

ti p H nw niwt or ti pr H nw niwt tpḥn in hieroglyphs Era: Ptolemaic dynasty (305–30 BC)	T b n F16 t niwt ṯbn(t) in hieroglyphs Era: New Kingdom (1550–1069 BC)	T b n t Z5 niwt ṯbn(t) in hieroglyphs Era: Late Period (664–332 BC)

== Archaeology ==
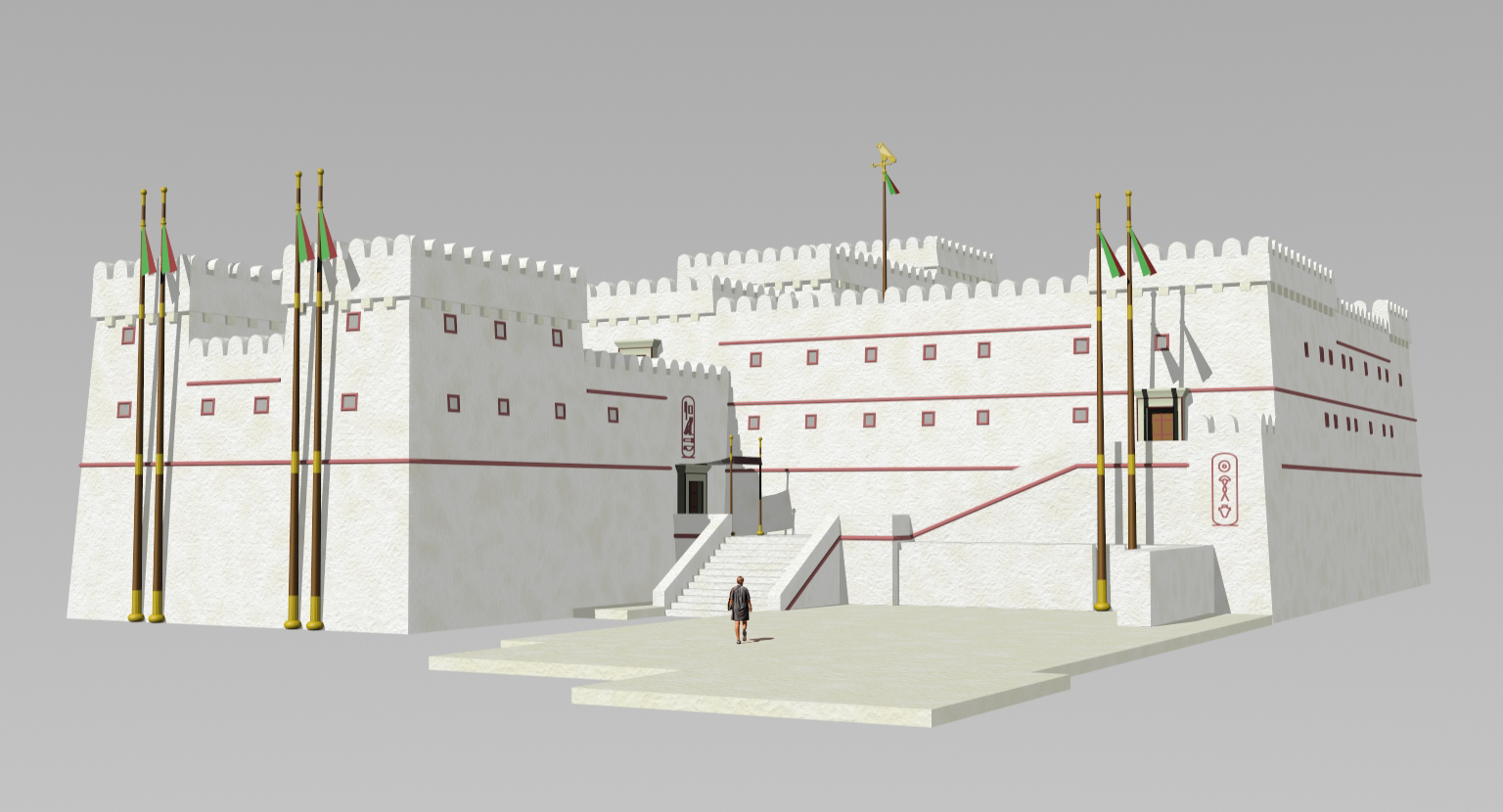
Artistic 3D reconstruction of the fort "Qasr Bint al-Yahudi" belong to the time between Psammetichus and Amasis

The site was discovered by Sir William Matthew Flinders Petrie in 1886; it was then known by natives as Qasr Bint al-Yahudi, the "Castle of the Jew's Daughter". He found a massive fort and enclosure. However, the chief discovery was a large number of fragments of pottery, which are of great importance for the chronology of vase-painting, since they must belong to the time between the 26th Dynasty pharaohs Psamtik I and Amasis II, i.e. the end of the 7th or the beginning of the 6th century BC. The fragments show the characteristics of Ionian art, but their shapes and other details testify to their local manufacture.

The city is mentioned in the Phoenician Saqqara letter (KAI 50), indicating that Phoenicians lived in the city at some point. Based on this letter, Egyptologist Noël Aimé-Giron proposed to identify Tahpanhes with the biblical location Baal-zephon, where according to the Hebrew Bible the Israelites fleeing Egypt camped before passing through the Red Sea (Exodus 14:1-9).

== History ==
According to Herodotus, the Pharaoh Psamtik I (664–610 BC) established a garrison of foreign mercenaries at Tahpanhes, mostly Carians and Ionian Greeks.

According to the Hebrew Bible, after Jerusalem had been destroyed in 586 BC and the Babylonian governor Gedaliah had been assassinated, Jews from Jerusalem fled to Tahpanhes and settled there for a time (Jeremiah 43–44). A platform of brickwork discovered at the site by Sir Flinders Petrie was tentatively identified as the pavement at the entry of Pharaoh's palace mentioned in Jeremiah. "Here," wrote Petrie, "the ceremony described by Jeremiah 43:8–10 took place before the chiefs of the fugitives assembled on the platform, and here Nebuchadnezzar II spread his royal pavilion." Tahpanes is also mentioned in Ezekiel 30:18 and in Jeremiah 2:16 and 46:14.

When Naucratis was given the monopoly of Greek traffic by Amasis II (570–526 BC), the Greeks were removed from Tahpanhes and its prosperity never returned. In Herodotus' time the deserted remains of the docks and buildings were visible.

== 2014 review ==
A re-evaluation of Flinders Petrie's 1886 excavations by Leclère and Spencer in 2014 came to the conclusion that Petrie put too much focus on Tahpanhes as primarily a Greek settlement.

"However, the architectural remains revealed by Petrie are first and foremost Egyptian in nature. Their features correspond to those of a classical temple town functioning as a frontier-post, and it is in this specific context that the presence of imports must be understood."

Thus, the Egyptian character of the site is actually more prominent, which shows in its indigenous Egyptian material culture, and locally made pottery. So its central temple appears as the main focus of this ancient town. The imported Greek, Cypriote, and Levantine goods can also be seen in this context.

== See also ==
- Tell Nebesha
