= Ishmael son of Nethaniah =

Biblical character, member of the house of Judah

Ishmael ben Nethaniah (Hebrew: ישמעאל בן נתניה (Note: Hebrew: ישמעאל, romanized: God shall hear; Hebrew: בן, romanized: son of)) was a member of the royal household of Judah who, according to biblical accounts in II Kings and Jeremiah, assassinated Gedaliah after he was appointed governor of Judah by king Nebuchadnezzar of Babylon. The biblical accounts suggest that Ishmael ben Nethaniah's actions were a key factor in the subsequent flight of the people of Judah to Egypt, something Jeremiah counsels strongly against (Jeremiah 42 - 43). Nonetheless, the people, led by Johanan son of Kareah, ignore his advice and depart for Egypt (Jeremiah 43:6).

== Ishmael's origins ==
Ishmael ben Nethaniah is described in 2 Kings 25:25 as the son of Nethaniah, "son of Elishama of the royal family". Jeremiah describes him as one of the chief officers of the (former) king Jehoiakim (Jeremiah 41:1).

== The assassination of Gedaliah ==
Ishmael was a soldier, described as a "captain of the forces" (2 Kings 25:23; and Jeremiah 41:3). Together with a number of other such captains, Ishmael emerges from the surrounding open country (Jeremiah 40:7) and makes his way to Mizpah, a city in Benjamin, after Gedaliah is appointed governor. Although the forces were likely to have been those dispersed by the Babylonian army after the fall of Jerusalem (2 Kings 25:5), it is possible that these captains had become local warlords or heads of semi-autonomous militia during the intervening period.

In Jeremiah's account, Johanan son of Kareah learns of the plot, and tries to warn Gedaliah. When his warning is ignored, he urges Gedaliah, in "private talks" (Jeremiah 40:15-16), to let him kill Ishmael - a request the governor refuses, believing the rumours to be a lie. Commentators have noted Gedaliah's lack of political acumen in the face of the looming threat, despite his seeming desire to do the best for his beleaguered people (Jeremiah 40:9).

Ishmael is described as approaching Gedaliah with ten men, and striking him down while a Rosh Hashanah feast is in progress (2 Kings 25:25) – a gross offence against prevailing customs of hospitality at the time. Judeans and Chaldeans with him (whether the latter are officials or soldiers is unclear – the II Kings and Jeremiah accounts differ on this point) are also slaughtered. Jeremiah suggests Ishmael's offence is further compounded by his slaughter of another group of men, pilgrims who arrive shortly afterwards from towns in the centre of the former kingdom of Israel, and are apparently in mourning (Jeremiah 41:7), possibly for the destruction of the Temple. All but ten of them are slaughtered and thrown into a cistern, the ten being spared because they have access to otherwise scarce food supplies (Jeremiah 41:8). After this fresh slaughter, Ishmael and his band make their way towards Ammon, with hostages from Mizpah. But before they get there, they are engaged in battle by Johanan son of Kareah at Gibeon, a place which in the time of Jeremiah already resonated with previous acts of treachery for the Israelites. Ishmael's band releases the hostages, but he himself escapes with eight of his men (Jeremiah 41:15). At this point he disappears from the biblical narrative.

== Dating ==
Commentators are uncertain when the assassination took place, but it can be argued as having happened within a year or two of Gedaliah's appointment. It is suspected that they spared the 10 hostages because they offer access to a secret food store suggests that the rural economy has still not recovered following the Babylonian invasion, which would tend to confirm an early date. However, Robert Carroll draws attention to the feasting at Mizpah, arguing that this suggests that a degree of productivity remained – confirmation, perhaps, that Babylon's objective in invading Judah was removal of the king rather than devastation of the land. For other reasons (see below), he suggests a date for the assassination some five or six years after Gedaliah's appointment.

== Aftermath of the assassination ==
The effect of Gedaliah's assassination is to reduce the people to a state of fear – probably out of concern at the revenge that Nebuchadnezzar would wreak for the attack (Jeremiah 41:17), though any such revenge is not clearly described in the biblical accounts. Carroll has suggested that the third deportation of Judahites recorded in Jeremiah 52:6-30, probably occurring in 583/2 BC, should be tied to the assassination.

It is possible that Jeremiah himself was part of the group taken captive by Ishmael, as they are camped near Bethlehem following the rescue. However, Carroll's study of Jeremiah sees the accounts in 40:7 – 41:18 and chapters 42 - 43 as distinct from each other, and argues that the Deuteronomist editor of Jeremiah has woven two independent strands together to highlight the chaos that ensues when the community is without access to a prophet, or, as in chapters 42 - 3, ignores his advice.

The assassination may or may not have been the reason for the later commemorative fast referred to in Zechariah 7:5 and Zechariah 8:19 – the so-called Fast of Gedaliah.

== Possible motives ==
Some commentators have suggested that Ishmael acts out of a sense of having been slighted when passed over for the governorship himself, despite being eligible by virtue of his royal familial connections. This is one possible interpretation of the statement that Ishmael slew Gedaliah 'because Nebuchadnezzar had appointed him governor' (Jeremiah 41:2). He may also have found Gedaliah's confident statement that 'all will be well' under Nebuchadnezzar (Jeremiah 40:9) tantamount to treason, especially given Babylon's earlier treatment of the royal household (Jeremiah 39:6). Robert Carroll describes the assassination as 'armed revolt against Babylonian authority and the execution of a collaborationist', noting also, however, that the tale hints at a residual factionalism that had bedevilled Judah in the period before the Babylonian invasion.

However, wider political machinations also seem to have played a part. Jeremiah (though not II Kings) makes clear that Ishmael has been sent by king Baalis of the neighboring kingdom of Ammon to kill Gedaliah. The full name of the Ammonite King Baalis (Ba'alyiša', 'Baal is salvation') has been attested for the first time on a seal impression dated to ca. 600 BC (see L. G. Herr, BA 48 [1985] 169-72). Baalis may have seen an opportunity to grab power for himself in the power vacuum. The writer of Jeremiah clearly crafts the account to portray this as a significant motive for Ishmael's attack, though Carroll argues that it is not Ishamel's own reason for acting.
