= Remnant (Bible) =

Recurring theme in the Bible

The remnant is a recurring theme throughout the Hebrew and Christian Bible. The Anchor Bible Dictionary describes it as "What is left of a community after it undergoes a catastrophe". The concept has stronger representation in the Hebrew Bible and Christian Old Testament than in the Christian New Testament.

== Biblical mentions ==
=== Hebrew Bible ===
According to the Book of Isaiah, the "remnant" (Hebrew: שְׁאָר, romanized: sh'ár) is a small group of Israelites who will survive the invasion of the Assyrian army under Tiglath-Pileser III (Isaiah 10:20–22). The remnant is promised that they will one day be brought back to the Promised Land by Yahweh (Isaiah 11:11–16). Isaiah again uses the terminology during Sennacherib's siege of Jerusalem (Isaiah 37).

The concept of the remnant is taken up by several other prophets, including Amos, Micah, Jeremiah and Zephaniah. In Jeremiah 39–40, the "poor people, who had nothing", who remained in Judah when the rest of its population were deported to Babylon, are referred to as a "remnant". The post-exilic biblical literature (Ezra–Nehemiah, Haggai and Zechariah) consistently refers to the Jews who have returned from the Babylonian captivity as the remnant.

=== New Testament ===
New Testament verses which refer to a faithful "remnant" (Biblical Greek: λεῖμμα, romanized: leîmma) include Romans 11:5, where Paul refers back to Old Testament examples, and Revelation 12:17 ("And the dragon was wroth with the woman, and went to make war with the remnant of her seed, which keep the commandments of God, and have the testimony of Jesus Christ").

== Church views ==
=== Church of England ===
The influential Anglican "remnant theology" of Martin Thornton (1915–1986) sees the church parish as made up of three different levels of members. Thornton refers to the smallest of the groups as the Remnant, likening it to the remnant of Isaiah in the Old Testament. These are ordinary people of extraordinary devotion, more proficient than spiritually gifted, whom it is vital for the parish priest to identify and nurture through spiritual direction, for they are the dependable, beating, praying heart of the parish. They truly live their Christianity and form the core not just of the parish but of the universal "Church Militant".

=== Roman Catholic Church ===
The Old Testament notion of "the remnant" was one of the three images Karl Rahner used to set the parish into his larger vision of church in his 1956 essay "Theology of the Parish" and his 1961 book The Episcopate and the Primacy, co-authored with then Cardinal Joseph Ratzinger (later Pope Benedict XVI). What was significant for Rahner in the concept of "the remnant" was the idea that the whole – the universal Church – could be present in the part – the parish: "the Church as a whole, when it becomes "Event" in the full sense, is also necessarily a local Church, the whole Church becomes tangible in the local Church".

=== Seventh-day Adventist Church ===
The Seventh-day Adventist Church places significant emphasis on the remnant theme, based on a traditional interpretation of the King James Version of Revelation 12:17. Two of its official belief statements mention the remnant theme: number 13, "Remnant and Its Mission" describes an eschatological (end-time) remnant, and number 18, "The Gift of Prophecy" mentions the spiritual gift of prophecy "is an identifying mark of the remnant church".

"The universal church is composed of all who truly believe in Christ, but in the last days, a time of widespread apostasy, a remnant has been called out to keep the commandments of God and the faith of Jesus. This remnant announces the arrival of the judgment hour, proclaims salvation through Christ, and heralds the approach of His second advent. This proclamation is symbolized by the three angels of Revelation 14; it coincides with the work of judgment in heaven and results in a work of repentance and reform on earth. Every believer is called to have a personal part in this worldwide witness. (Rev. 12:17; 14:6–12; 18:1–4; 2 Cor. 5:10; Jude 3, 14; 1 Peter 1:16–19; 2 Peter 3:10–14; Rev. 21:1–14.)"

— Seventh-day Adventist fundamental Belief # 13

== Criticism ==
James Watts claims that some authors have given too much emphasis to the remnant theme, such as some scholars who "have considered it central to the NT message". According to Watts, there are fewer occurrences of the theme in the Bible than one might expect.
