= J. A. Thompson =

Australian biblical scholar

John Arthur Thompson (1913–2002) was an Australian Old Testament scholar and biblical archaeologist.

Thompson studied at the University of Queensland, the University of Melbourne and the University of Cambridge, gaining degrees in science, the arts, and theology. For a number of years he taught chemistry and physics. He taught at the University of Melbourne's School of Middle Eastern Studies (1947–1956), and the Baptist Theological College of New South Wales (from 1957). He was the first director of the Australian Institute of Archaeology in Melbourne, from 1947. During 1950–51 he was an honorary Fellow of the American Schools of Oriental Research at the Jerusalem school and worked at the archaeological sites of Roman Jericho and Dibon.

Thompson wrote commentaries on Deuteronomy (ISBN 0-8308-4205-5), 1 and 2 Chronicles (ISBN 0-8054-0109-1), and Jeremiah (ISBN 0-8028-2530-3). He was one of the translators of the New Living Translation.

He also wrote "Archaeology and the Pre-Christian Centuries" (Grand Rapids: Eerdmans, 1958). (Library of Congress, 58-13061)

== Works ==
=== Books ===
- Thompson, John Arthur (1948). Luke the Historian. Melbourne: Australian Institute of Archaeology.
- ——— (1953). Archaeology and the Old Testament. Grand Rapids, MI: Eerdmans.
- ——— (1958). Archaeology and the Pre-Christian Centuries. Grand Rapids, MI: Eerdmans.
- ——— (1959). The Bible and Archaeology. Grand Rapids, MI: Eerdmans.
- ——— (1960). Archaeology and the New Testament. Grand Rapids, MI: Eerdmans.
- ———. The Ancient Near Eastern Treaties and the Old Testament. Tyndale Lecture in Biblical Archaeology, 1963. London: Tyndale Press, 1964.
- ——— (1974). Deuteronomy : an introduction and commentary. Tyndale Old Testament Commentary. London; Downers Grove, IL: Inter-Varsity Press.
- ——— (1980). The Book of Jeremiah. New International Commentary on the Old Testament. Grand Rapids, MI: Eerdmans.
- ——— (1986). Handbook of Life in Bible Times. Leicester, England: Inter-Varsity Press.
- ——— (1994). 1, 2 Chronicles. New American Commentary. Vol. 9. Nashville, TN: Broadman & Holman.
- ——— (2022). The Book of Jeremiah. Eerdmans Classic Biblical Commentaries. Grand Rapids, MI: Eerdmans.
