= Alfred Rahlfs =

- Born: 29 May 1865; Linden, Hanover
- Died: 8 April 1935 (aged 69); Göttingen, Prussia

Academic background
- Education: University of Halle; University of Göttingen

Academic work
- Discipline: Biblical studies
- Institutions: University of Göttingen
- Notable works: his edition of the Septuagint

Alfred Rahlfs (/rɑːlfs/; German: [ʀaːlfs]; 29 May 1865 – 8 April 1935) was a German Biblical scholar. He was a member of the history of religions school. He is known for his edition of the Septuagint published in 1935.

== Biography ==
He was born in Linden near Hanover, and studied Protestant Theology, Philosophy, and Oriental Languages in Halle and Göttingen, where he received a PhD in 1887. His professional career developed in Göttingen, where he was Stiftsinspektor (from 1888), Privatdozent (from 1891), Extraordinarius (from 1914), and Professor for Old Testament (from 1919). He retired in 1933 and died in Göttingen.

Influenced by his teacher Paul de Lagarde, Rahlfs's academic interest focused on the Septuagint, the Greek translation of the Hebrew Bible. Together with Rudolf Smend and others, Rahlfs was responsible for the creation of the Septuaginta-Unternehmen under Göttingen's and Berlin's Academies of Sciences and Humanities in 1907, which he directed from 1908 until 1933. Its goal has been to reconstruct the original wording of the Septuagint, and since Rahlfs' death it had published twenty volumes.

Rahlfs edited a preliminary but influential edition of the Septuagint, which appeared in two volumes in the year he died, in addition to one critical volume (Psalmi cum Odis) and two slim volumes on the Book of Ruth and Genesis. In 2006, a revision of his Septuaginta, made by Robert Hanhart, was published by the Deutsche Bibelgesellschaft. This editio altera includes over a thousand changes to the text and apparatus. Rahlfs' sigla of Septuagint manuscripts are still cited.

== Select bibliography ==
- Alfred Rahlfs, Septuaginta-Studien, 3 vols., Göttingen: Vandenhoeck & Ruprecht, 1904–11.
- Alfred Rahlfs, Verzeichniz der griechischen Handschriften des Alten Testaments, für das Septuaginta-Unternehmen, Göttingen 1914.
- Alfred Rahlfs (ed.), Das Buch Rut griechisch als Probe einer kritischen Handausgabe der LXX, Stuttgart: Privileg. Württ. Bibelanstalt, 1922.
- Alfred Rahlfs (ed.), Genesis, Septuaginta: Vetus Testamentum graecum I, Stuttgart: Privilegierte Württembergische Bibelanstalt, 1926.
- Alfred Rahlfs (ed.), Psalmi cum Odis, Septuaginta: Vetus Testamentum graecum X.1, Göttingen : Vandenhoeck & Ruprecht, 1931.
- Alfred Rahlfs (ed.), Septuaginta: id est Vetus Testamentum graece iuxta LXX interpretes, 2 vols., Stuttgart: Privileg. Württembergische Bibelanstalt, 1935.
