= Jaazaniah =

Biblical name

Jaazaniah (Hebrew: יַאֲזַנְיָה Yaʾăzanyā, lit. “May God hear”) or Jezaniah is a biblical Hebrew personal name that appears in the Bible for several different individuals, and has been found on an onyx seal dating from the 6th century BC.

== Biblical references ==
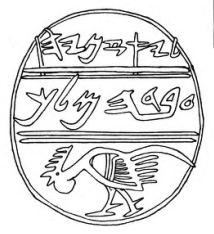
Drawing of the impression made by the onyx seal of Jaazaniah

Four distinct individuals named Jaazaniah are mentioned in the Bible:

Jaazaniah the son of Hoshaiah was an officer in the army of the kingdom of Judah. He joined the Babylonian-appointed ruler Gedaliah at Mizpah after the exile of Judah (2 Kings 25:23 and Jeremiah 40:8). He was also called Jezaniah. The onyx seal found at Mizpah dating to this period and bearing the inscription “(belonging) to Ya’azaniah the servant of the king” may have belonged to this individual.

Jaazaniah, son of a man called Jeremiah (not the prophet), and grandson of Habazziniah, was the leader of the clan of the Rechabites at the time of the prophet Jeremiah. The prophet Jeremiah brings Jaazaniah and other members of his clan to the Temple, where they refuse to drink wine offered to them, in commemoration of their ancestor, Jonadab son of Rechab who had forbidden his followers to drink wine. Jeremiah commends them to the people and shows them as an example of people who know how to keep their principles. (Jeremiah 35:3).

Jaazaniah son of Shaphan was one of the 70 elders of Israel whom the prophet Ezekiel sees in a vision committing idolatry because they believed that God had abandoned the world and was no longer watching them (Ezekiel 8:11).

Jaazaniah son of Azzur was a leader of Israel and a false prophet whom the prophet Ezekiel sees in a vision of iniquitous elders standing at a gate of the Temple, falsely telling the people that Jerusalem will not be destroyed (Ezekiel 11:1).

== Onyx seal ==
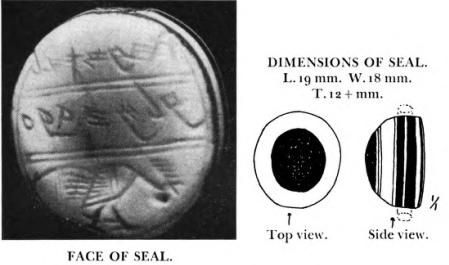
Photograph of the face of the seal, and drawing illustrating its construction from black and white onyx.

The name Jaazaniah appears on a sixth-century BC onyx seal discovered during the excavation of the Tell en-Nasbeh site, likely the biblical city of Mizpah in Benjamin, near Jerusalem, conducted between 1926 and 1935 by William Frederic Badè of the Pacific School of Religion in Berkeley, CA. The seal was found in Stratum 3 of the tell, dating it to the period from shortly after 586 BCE until about 400 BCE (Iron Age II period). The epigraphy of the seal is consistent with dating it to the time of Gedaliah. It's a black and white banded onyx scaraboid. Written in the paleo-Hebrew alphabet, it is part of a larger group of artifacts known as Canaanite and Aramaic seal inscriptions.

The seal carries the inscription “(belonging) to Jaazaniah the servant of the king.” The seal may have belonged to an officer named Jaazaniah who, according to II Kings 25:23 and Jeremiah 40:8, came to the Babylonian-appointed ruler Gedaliah at Mizpah after the fall of Jerusalem.

At the bottom of the seal is the image of a fighting cock, one of the earliest representations of this bird ever recovered, and certainly the first known representation of the chicken in ancient Israel. This depiction is consistent with the remains of these birds found at other Israelite Iron Age sites, when the rooster was used as a fighting bird. They are also pictured on other seals from the period as a symbol of ferocity, such as on the one engraved on a late seventh-century BCE red jasper seal inscribed “Jehoahaz, son of the king.”

== See also ==
- List of artifacts significant to the Bible
