= William F. Badè =

Bible scholar, biographer, archaeologist (1871–1936)

William Fredric Bade
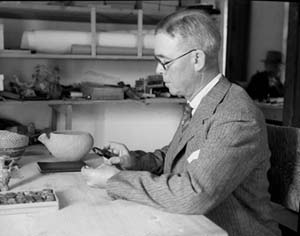
- William F. Badè examining an artifact, circa 1933
- Born: 22 January 1871; Carver, Minnesota
- Died: March 4, 1936 (aged 65)
- Education: Moravian College, Lehigh University, Yale Divinity School
- Works: Life and Letters of John Muir
- Movement: Sierra Club
- Spouses: Evelyn Marianne (Mary) Ratliff, Elizabeth Le Breton Marston
- Children: 3, including William G. Bade
- Parent(s): William Bruns & Anna Voigt Badè

William Frederic Badè (January 22, 1871 – March 4, 1936), perhaps best known as the literary executor and biographer of John Muir, was a versatile scholar of wide interests. As an archaeologist, he led the excavation of Tell en-Nasbeh in Palestine, now believed on the basis of his work to be the biblical city of Mizpah in Benjamin. He was also an ordained Moravian minister, a professor of ancient languages, a theologian and bible scholar, a mountaineer, a conservationist and a naturalist. Born and raised in Minnesota, he studied at Moravian College and its seminary as well as other universities. He served on the faculties of Moravian Theological Seminary and then the Pacific School of Religion. He also served as interim president and subsequently as dean of the Pacific School of Religion and was founding director of the school's Palestine Institute. He was president of the Sierra Club 1919–1922 and edited the Sierra Club Bulletin for 12 years.

== Early life and education ==
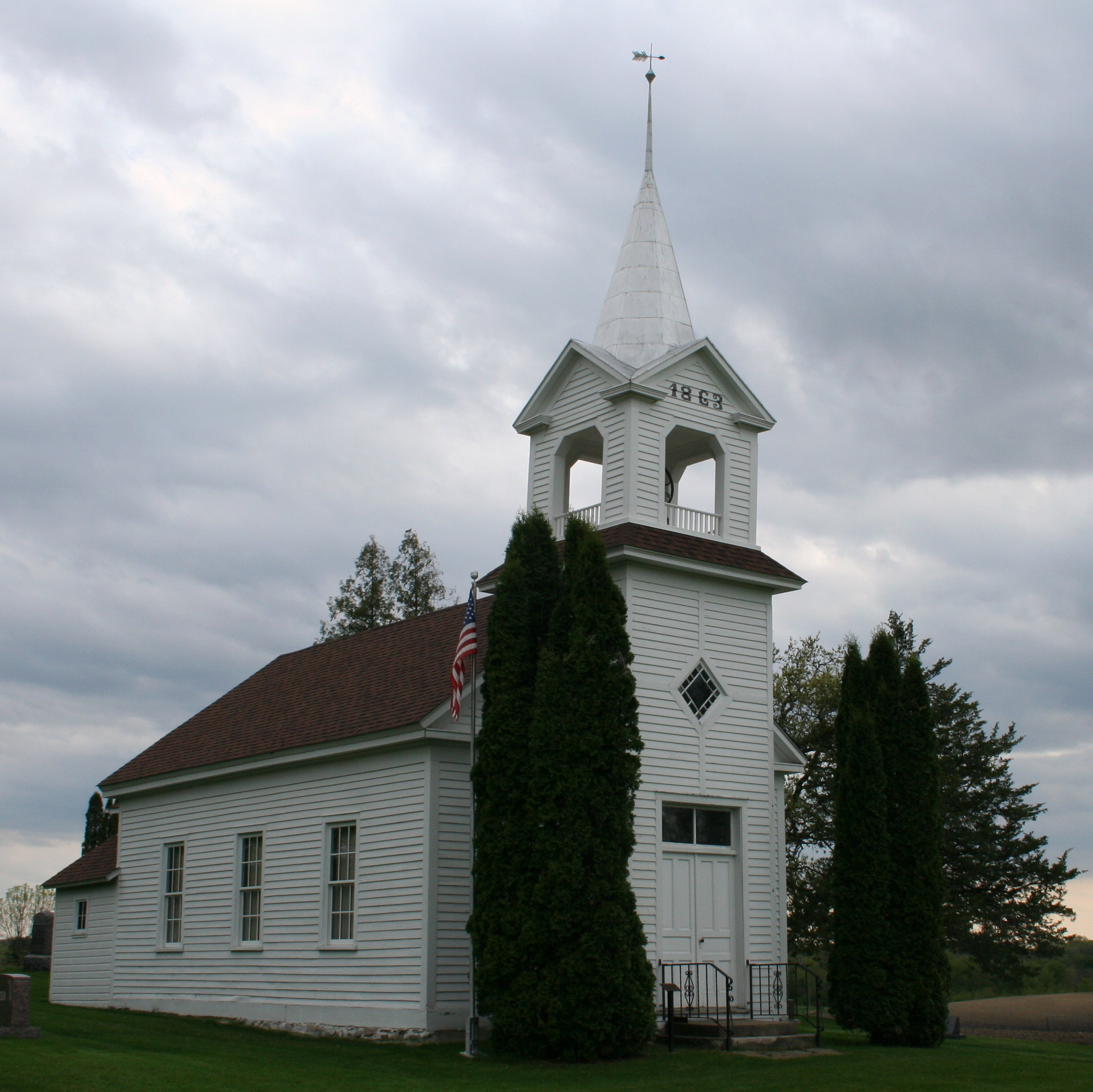
Zoar Moravian Church, Carver County, Minnesota, on the National Register of Historic Places and at the core of the community where Badè grew up. Badè's parents are buried here.

Badè was born in Carver, Minnesota, and grew up a few miles northwest of there on a farm near Waconia, Minnesota, in the rural community associated with Zoar Moravian Church. He was the first of ten surviving children of William Bruns (1831–1902) and Anna Voigt Badè (1850-–1910), immigrants from Germany. His father was a scholar who left Hanover for political reasons; on arriving in the United States in 1858 he worked on riverboats and later farmed. Anna Voigt immigrated from Prussia in 1868; they married at Carver in 1870. (Note: Colby writes Badè's father's name as William Brauns Badè; Zorn, Sutcliffe and the Yale obituary spell it Bruns. He appears in the census for Laketown Township, Carver County, Minnesota, as William Bade born in Hanover about 1831, married to Anna with a son William born about 1871. These are the only William Bades appearing in the census for Laketown township in this period. Find-A-Grave has William J Bade 1831–1902, buried at Zoar Moravian Church; the different middle initial may be due to loss of legibility of the stone or could be an alternative, Americanized version of his name. Colby, Sutcliffe, and the Yale obituary give Badè's mother's name as Anna Voigt Badè; Lockley and Zorn spell it Voight. She appears in the census as Anna Bade, spouse of William, born about 1851 in Prussia. Find-A-Grave lists Anna Voight Bade 1850–1910 buried at Zoar Moravian Church. Neither gravestone is photographed.)

Badè attended public schools but also studied with a private tutor. He grew up speaking English and German and learned Greek and Latin as a boy. He attended Moravian College and the associated seminary, earning his way by playing organ and giving music lessons, attaining AB and BD degrees. He was ordained at Bethlehem, Pennsylvania, in 1894, and went on to Yale Divinity School to study ancient languages and Arabic, earning a second BD in 1895. After short pastoral appointments at Unionville, Michigan, and Chaska, Minnesota, he returned to Moravian College as instructor of Greek and German, earning his PhD from that institution in 1898 with a thesis on the Assyrian flood legends. He studied geology at Lehigh University (1901–1902). He also studied in Berlin (1905) and in Paris (1909). In adulthood, he could read 14 languages and converse fluently in seven.

== Academic appointments ==
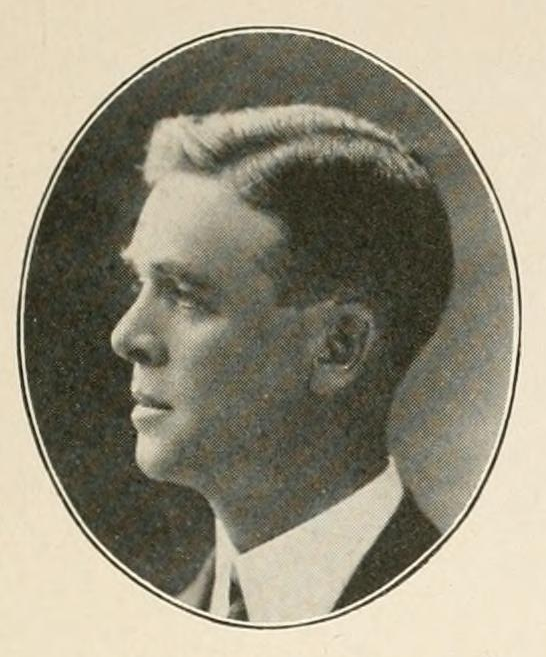
Badè as a young professor, 1917 or earlier

Badè was appointed professor of Hebrew and Old Testament Literature at Moravian Theological Seminary, serving 1898–1902. He was appointed professor of Old Testament Literature and Semitic Languages, Pacific Theological Seminary (later Pacific School of Religion), Berkeley, California, in 1902, holding that position the rest of his life.

Badè was dean of the Federated Summer School of Theology at Berkeley, 1907. He served as interim president of the Pacific School of Religion 1920–1922, subsequently serving as dean 1922–1928 and as director of the school's Palestine Institute (which he founded) from 1926 until his death.

As a professor, Badè was among the first in the United States to teach the then-new and controversial Documentary Hypothesis concerning the origins and authorship of the Pentateuch. In 1915, he published The Old Testament in the Light of Today, A Study in Moral Development, developing themes he had presented eight years earlier in a series of lectures "The Idea of God in the Old Testament" at the Berkeley Summer School of Theology.

== Editor and biographer of John Muir ==
An avid outdoorsman with strong interests in ornithology and botany, Badè first met John Muir through the Sierra Club, which he joined in 1903. After Muir's death in 1914, Muir's daughters asked Badè to serve as literary executor and prepare Muir's unpublished writings for publication. Badè compiled and edited materials from Muir's journals and other unpublished writings as well as short published pieces, resulting in publication of A Thousand-Mile Walk to the Gulf, The Cruise of the Corwin, and Steep Trails. Bade also wrote the preface for Muir's Travels in Alaska and edited new versions of Muir's earlier books, leading to an 8-volume set The Writings of John Muir, and the two-volume biography Life and Letters of John Muir.

For the Life and Letters of John Muir Badè collected over 2000 letters from Muir's correspondents. He also worked out Muir's itinerary in Canada from the dates and locations in a collection of Muir's botanical specimens discovered in an attic in Wisconsin.

== Archaeological investigation of Tell en-Nasbeh ==
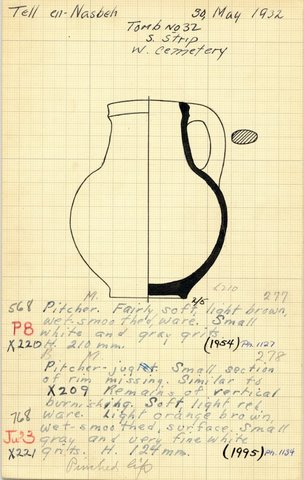
Expedition note card with drawing of a jug found at Tell en-Nasbeh, illustrating the manner of recordkeeping

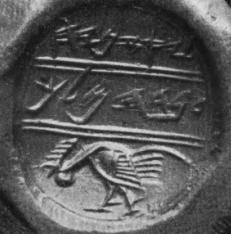
Wax impression of the Seal of Jaazaniah, discovered by Badè at Tell en-Nasbeh

Badè had a long-standing interest in archaeology. He traveled in the Middle East in 1909 and had planned to start fieldwork in Syria in 1914, but World War I and his appointment as Muir's executor intervened. He continued to study archaeology, including the methods employed in desert areas of the American Southwest. In 1925 he went to Palestine to organize an excavation, having corresponded with William F. Albright to identify suitable locations for excavation. Albright considered Tell en-Nasbeh, (about 7 miles north of Jerusalem) a possible location of the biblical city of Mizpah in Benjamin but favored Nabi Samwil as the most likely. Badè chose to excavate Tell en-Nasbeh which proved to be the correct location. The site was initially identified in part based on a German World War I aerial photograph showing evidence of walls and alteration of vegetation over buildings. Badè brought his characteristic thoroughness and organizational talent to bear, seeking advice from prominent archaeologists including Albright and Clarence S. Fisher. Badè led five seasons of excavation (1926, 1927, 1929, 1932, 1935), meticulously documenting artifacts and mapping the site. Among the artifacts was the onyx seal of Ja'azanaiah, Servant of the King, plausibly identified with a Judean officer of that name mentioned twice in the Bible. Badè funded the excavation in part with royalties from the Muir books and with gifts from friends. The identification of Tell En-Nasbeh with Mizpah is now generally accepted. As of 1988, no other Palestinian site of comparable size had been excavated as thoroughly.

In this investigation, Badè employed and refined the Reisner-Fisher method, dividing the site into 10-meter squares and excavating these in strips. All artifacts including potshards were drawn to scale on millimeter-gridded file cards. The excavation was meticulously mapped and the site, operations, and artifacts were extensively photographed. Badè documented his methods in A Manual of Excavation in the Near East, published in 1934. This was the first book dedicated to documenting the work of an excavation and the development of its methodology. It served as a guide for field workers for many years. Badè was the first archaeologist to document and record fingerprints on pottery as a means to track the work of individual potters.

Badè died of a stroke 4 March 1936, before the analysis of the excavation was complete. The full reports were completed by his associates and published in 1947. The collection remains in the Badè Museum at the Pacific School of Religion.

== Civic and professional activities ==
While in Pennsylvania, Badè edited The Moravian for one year. He was a member of the Pennsylvania Chautauqua faculty in charge of botany. He sang bass and chaired the program committee for the Bethlehem Bach Choir in its early years.

Badè served on the board of the Sierra Club from 1907–1936. He worked prominently with Muir and other members on the Hetch Hetchy Valley campaign, including serving as vice president of the Society for Preservation of National Parks. He edited the Sierra Club Bulletin 1910–1922 and served as the fourth president of the club, 1919–1922. As part of his work with the Sierra Club he headed the California Associated Societies for the Preservation of Wild Life for many years. He was California state chairman of the Commission for Relief in Belgium and Northern France 1915–1917, vice president of the American Alpine Club 1920–1922, and a trustee of Mills College 1918–1931.

He served on the board of the School of American Research of the Archaeological Institute of America at Santa Fe 1929–1936, and was president of the Society for Biblical Literature and Exegesis in 1930.

== Family ==
In 1906, Badè married Evelyn Marianne (Mary) Ratcliff (b. 1879), a clergyman's daughter and a 1901 mathematics and physics graduate of the University of California, whom he had met on a Sierra Club outing. She died the following year. They had one daughter, Evelyn Mary (1907–2000) who in 1931 married Sidney L. Gulick Jr. (1902–1988). He was a son of Japan scholar and peace activist Sidney Gulick and later served as professor of English and Dean of Arts and Sciences at San Diego State University.

In 1917 Badè married another Sierra Club member, Elizabeth Le Breton Marston (1884–1987), daughter of George Marston of San Diego, whom he had met in the course of his war-relief work. Part of their honeymoon was spent retracing John Muir's "Thousand-mile Walk", and some of his Alaska travels. They had two children, Elizabeth Le Breton (Betsy, 1922–2008) and William George (1924–2012). Betsy, who in 1968 married Korea scholar Wilbur D. Bacon (1926–1971), was for many years residence director of International House, Berkeley. William, who in 1952 married Eleanor Barry, became professor of mathematics at the University of California, Berkeley.

== Honors ==
- DD, Pomona College, 1922
- LittD, Mills College, 1925
- DD, Glasgow University, 1934
- The Badè Museum of Biblical Archaeology at the Pacific School of Religion is named for him.

== Selected works by William Frederic Badè as author, editor, or organizer ==
- The Writings of John Muir (series editor), Houghton Mifflin Co. Series introduction by Badè
- John Muir and William Frederic Badè (Note: Badè now commonly is credited as co-author in citations to the three Muir books he compiled from unpublished writings and short pieces, as here and below. In the original editions John Muir has sole title-page credit as author; furthermore Badè has a title-page credit as editor only on The Cruise of the Corwin for which he wrote a substantial introduction.) A Thousand Mile Walk to the Gulf, Houghton Mifflin Co., 1916.
- John Muir and William Frederic Badè The Cruise of the Corwin, Houghton Mifflin Co., 1917.
- John Muir and William Frederic Badè Steep Trails, Houghton Mifflin Co., 1918.
- William Frederic Badè Preface to Travels in Alaska, Houghton Mifflin Co., 1915.
- William Frederic Badè The Life and Letters of John Muir Houghton Mifflin Co., 1924. Text and illustrations on the Sierra Club website

- William F. Badè The Kuenen-Wellhausen Theory: Authorship of the Pentateuch examined; Thesis, Moravian College, 1892
- William Frederic Badè "Moravian College and Theological Seminary" in Report of the Superintendent of Public Instruction, Commonwealth of Pennsylvania, 1900, pp. 651–654.
- William Frederic Badè "Old testament scholarship in modern Bible teaching" Inaugural Addresses on the Occasion of the Induction of William Frederic Badè, John Wright Buckham and T. Cowden Laughlin Into the Faculty of Pacific Theological Seminary, Berkeley, California, January 23, 1905.
- William Frederic Badè "Italian Modernism, Social and Religious" Harvard Theological Review 4(2)147–174, 1911
- William F. Badè "The Canonization of the Old Testament" The Biblical World 37, pp. 151–162, 1911
- William Frederic Badè The Old Testament in the light of to-day : a study in moral development Houghton Mifflin Company, 1915
- William Frederic Badè "The excavations at Tell en-Nasbeh" Bulletin of the American Schools of Oriental Research 26, 1–7, 1927
- William F. Badè "The Seal Of Jaazaniah"; Zeitschrift fur die Alttestamentliche Wissenschaft 50, 89–90, 1933
- William Frederic Badè A manual of excavation in the Near East; methods of digging and recording of the Tell en-Nasbeh expedition in Palestine; University of California Press, 1934
- Chester Charlton McCown Tell en-Naṣbeh : excavated under the direction of the late William Frederic Badè; I,Archaeological and historical results; Palestine Institute of Pacific School of Religion 1947
- Joseph Carson Wampler Tell en-Naṣbeh: excavated under the direction of the late William Frederic Badè; II, The pottery.; Palestine Institute of Pacific School of Religion 1947–

- William Frederic Badè "Bach Redevivus" The Independent 52, pp. 1788–1780, July 26, 1900.
- William F. Badè "Federate Theology" Sunset 19, August 1907, pp. 399–400. Bade's description of the aims and scope of the Federated Summer School of Theology, 1907
- William F. Badè, Short pieces in the Sierra Club Bulletin, by volume and page; available on Archive.org

"On the Trail with the Sierra Club", 5, 50
"The Water-Ouzel at Home", 5, 102
"The Tuolumne Canyon", 5, 287
"An Ascent of the Matterhorn", 6, 75
"Some Birds of the High Sierra", 8, 158
"The Mountain Bluebird and the Wood Pewee", 8, 260
"To Higher Sierras", 10, 38
"Haleakala and Kilauea", 11, 231
"An Outdoor Litany", 11, 270

- William Frederic Badè "Hetch Hetchy Valley and the Tuolumne Canyon", The Independent 64, pp. 1079–1084, May 14, 1908.
- William Frederic Badè "Summering in the Sierra" The Independent 70, pp. 1363–1366, June 22, 1911.
- William Frederic Badè "The higher functions of a mountain club" The Mountaineer 5, pp. 9–13, 1912
- William Frederic Badè "John Muir in Yosemite" Natural History 20, pp. 132–141, 1920
- William Frederic Bade "Further Comment on the Proposed Roosevelt-Sequoia National Park and the Barbour Bill" Ecology 4(2) 1923, pp. 217–219 (fee, subscription, or free but limited enrollment required for JSTOR access)
- William F. Bade "Fingerprints on Pottery Aid in Tracing Past." Science News Letter. 1934, 261–262

== Sources ==
- Badè Museum of Biblical Archaeology. William Frederic Badè (1871–1936)
- Bade, Elizabeth Marston, interviewed by Eleanor Bade "Recollections of William F. Bade and the Early Sierra Club." Sierra Club Oral History Series, "Sierra Club Women I and II", Bancroft Library.
- Berkeley Daily Gazette, "Leave for East" August 24, 1931 p. 4 (Evelyn Bade marriage)
- Brannigan, Keith, Yiannis Papadatos and Douglas Wynn "Fingerprints on Early Minoan Pottery: A Pilot Study". Annual of the British School at Athens 97, (2002), pp. 49–53
- Census records, Minnesota State Census 1875 and US Census 1900, William Bade and Anna Bade, and Minnesota marriage records, at FamilySearch.org
- Colby, William E. William Frederic Badè Tribute
- College of Arms (Great Britain). Visitation of England and Wales v3 p. 140 (Evelyn Ratcliff birth date)
- Hamersly, L.R. Men and Women of America: A Biographical Dictionary of Contemporaries pp. 73–74, 1909
- Lockley, Fred. "Digging up buried cities". Overland Monthly June 1931, pp. 7–8, 30
- New York Post. "Dr. William Bade, Archaeologist, succumbs at 65", p. 10, March 5, 1936
- San Diego State University Library. Guide to the Sidney L. Gulick Papers Biographical Information section. (Gulick dates and career)
- San Diego Union-Tribune "William George Bade Obituary" September 16, 2012
- San Francisco Chronicle "Elizabeth Bade Bacon Death Notice" July 6, 2008
- Schwartze, William Nathaniel. History of the Moravian College and Theological Seminary; Times Publishing Company, Printers, 1909 p. 318
- Sierra Club. William Frederic Badè (1871–1936)
- Sierra Club Bulletin 6(4) January 1908 Notes and Correspondence p. 275 Evelyn Ratcliff Bade death notice
- Social Security Death Index at Ancestry.com query Evelyn M Gulick dob 1907; query Elizabeth Bade dob 1884 dod 1987; query Wilbur D Bacon dob 1926
- Society of Biblical Literature - List of Presidents
- Sutcliffe, George, compiler. "Bade, William Frederic" Who's Who in Berkeley 1917 pp. 10–11
- The Pacific "The New Professors for Pacific Theological Seminary" v 52, July 31, 1902 pp. 7–8
- University of California. University Chronicle, 4, p. 237. (Evelyn Ratcliff)
- Walters, Raymond The Bethlehem Bach choir; an historical and interpretative sketch Houghton Mifflin, 1918
- Yale University. Bulletin of Yale University. Obituary record of graduates of Yale University deceased during the year 1935–1936. 15 October 1936 pp. 232–233.
- Zorn. Jeffrey (a). "A Legacy of Publication: William Frederic Badè and Tell en-Nasbeh" Biblical Archaeology Review, July/August 1987 pp. 68–69.
- Zorn, Jeffrey (b). "William Frederic Badè" Biblical Archaeologist March 1988 pp. 28–35
