= Pacific School of Religion =

Multi-Denominational Protestant seminary in Berkeley, California

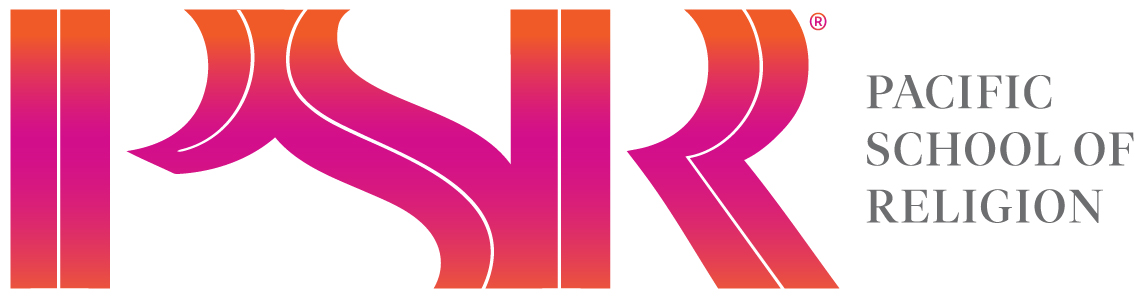
- Former name: Pacific Theological Seminary (until 1916)
- Motto: Unafraid Since 1866
- Type: Private seminary
- Established: 1866
- Religious affiliation: A Multi-Denominational Seminary of the United Church of Christ with historic ties to the United Methodist Church and the Christian Church (Disciples of Christ)
- President: David Vásquez-Levy
- Dean: Susan Abraham
- Academic staff: 31
- Students: 210
- Location: Berkeley, California, United States; 37.876594°N 122.263301°W
- Campus: Urban
- Website: www.psr.edu

The Pacific School of Religion (PSR) is a private Protestant seminary in Berkeley, California, United States. It maintains covenantal relationships with the United Church of Christ, the United Methodist Church, and the Disciples of Christ, ensuring the school provides the necessary requirements for candidates to seek ordination within these denominations. These three denominations account for approximately half of the student population of PSR. The school has also maintained close relationships with the Unitarian Universalist Association, the Universal Fellowship of Metropolitan Community Churches, the African Methodist Episcopal Church, as well as other denominations. Over the years PSR has provided training for clergy and leaders from a wide range of religious traditions including Buddhists, Jews, Pagans, Pentecostals, and Roman Catholics.

== History ==
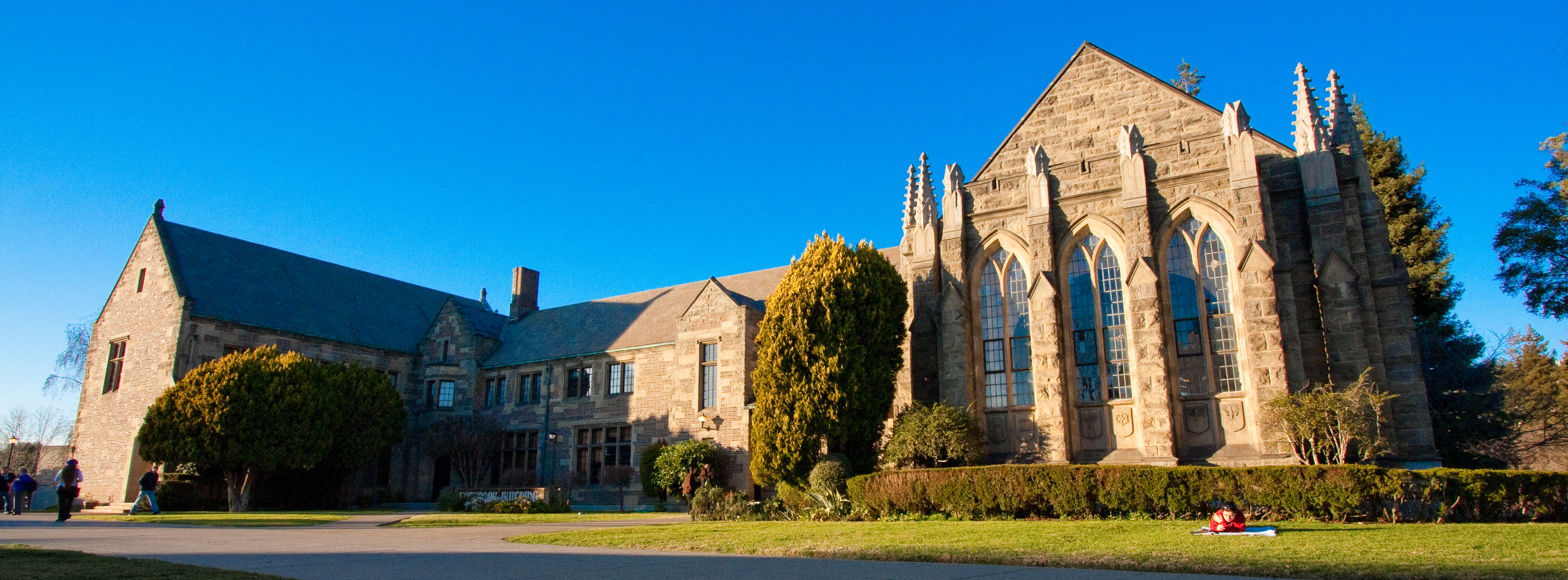
Holbrook Building

The Pacific School of Religion was founded in San Francisco, California, in 1866 as the Pacific Theological Seminary, making PSR the oldest Protestant seminary west of the Mississippi River. It moved to Oakland shortly following its foundation, and then to Berkeley in 1901, where it has remained since, at its current location since 1926.

In the early 1960s, the school helped found, and then in 1964 joined, the Graduate Theological Union (GTU), a consortium of nine seminaries in the San Francisco Bay Area. Also, throughout its history, the Pacific School of Religion has cooperated and reciprocated with two neighboring Berkeley institutions, the University of California at Berkeley and the First Congregational Church of Berkeley, United Church of Christ (UCC).

The school was one of the first American seminaries to focus on both pan-denominational issues as well as the importance of the world's religions. In 1971 it graduated its first openly gay student and has remained a leader in advocating for LGBT (lesbian, gay, bisexual, transgender) people within the religious community. As part of this commitment to LGBT issues, in 2000, the Pacific School of Religion opened the Center for Lesbian and Gay Studies in Religion and Ministry (CLGS), the first center of its kind, which focuses on scholarship and education in the realm of sexuality and sexual orientation/identity in areas of faith and religion.

In 2000, PSR also founded an institute specifically devoted to the study of Pacific Asian religion (the PANA Institute), but PANA was placed on indefinite hiatus in 2009 due to budgetary concerns. Pacific School of Religion also is the home of the Center for Swedenborgian Studies, which is certified to train students for ordination in the General Convention of Swedenborgian Churches. The SHS owns the assets of the former Swedenborg School of Religion in Newton, Massachusetts.

== Academics ==
The Pacific School of Religion offers master's and doctoral degrees as well as certificates.

== Badè Museum of Biblical Archaeology ==
The Badè Museum of Biblical Archaeology is housed on the campus of the Pacific School of Religion and contains a sizable collection of artifacts. The museum is named for the past Professor of Old Testament literature and Semitic languages at PSR, William F. Badè. The largest portion of the permanent collection was excavated under the direction of Dr. Badè at Tell en-Nasbeh, believed to be the site of the Biblical city of Mizpah, from 1926 to 1935. Artifacts recovered from Tell en-Nasbeh encompass the entire life of the community, including lamps, jewellery, and pitchers found in the town's houses and tombs. The permanent collection of the Badè also include a selection of over 300 rare Bibles and other books, collected by John Howell in the early part of the 20th century.

=== Doug Adams Gallery ===
The Doug Adams Gallery at the Badè Museum is a fixture of the Center for Arts, Religion, and Education, an academic Center in the GTU. The gallery presents quarterly exhibits in an effort to help augment the curriculum of the GTU consortium through works which span the spectrum of religious and spiritual focus.

== Notable alumni ==
- Lynda Goodsell Blake – missionary and educator in Turkey
- Vernard Eller – author and Christian pacifist
- Georgia Harkness – Methodist theologian
- William R. Johnson – first openly gay minister to be ordained in a historic Protestant denomination
- Victoria Kolakowski – Superior Court judge in Alameda County, California. Upon her election in 2010, Kolakowski became the first transgender trial judge in the nation
- R. J. Rushdoony – father of Christian reconstructionism

== See also ==
- Swedenborgian House of Studies
