= Laketown Moravian Brethren's Church =

Historic church in Minnesota, United States

- U.S. National Register of Historic Places
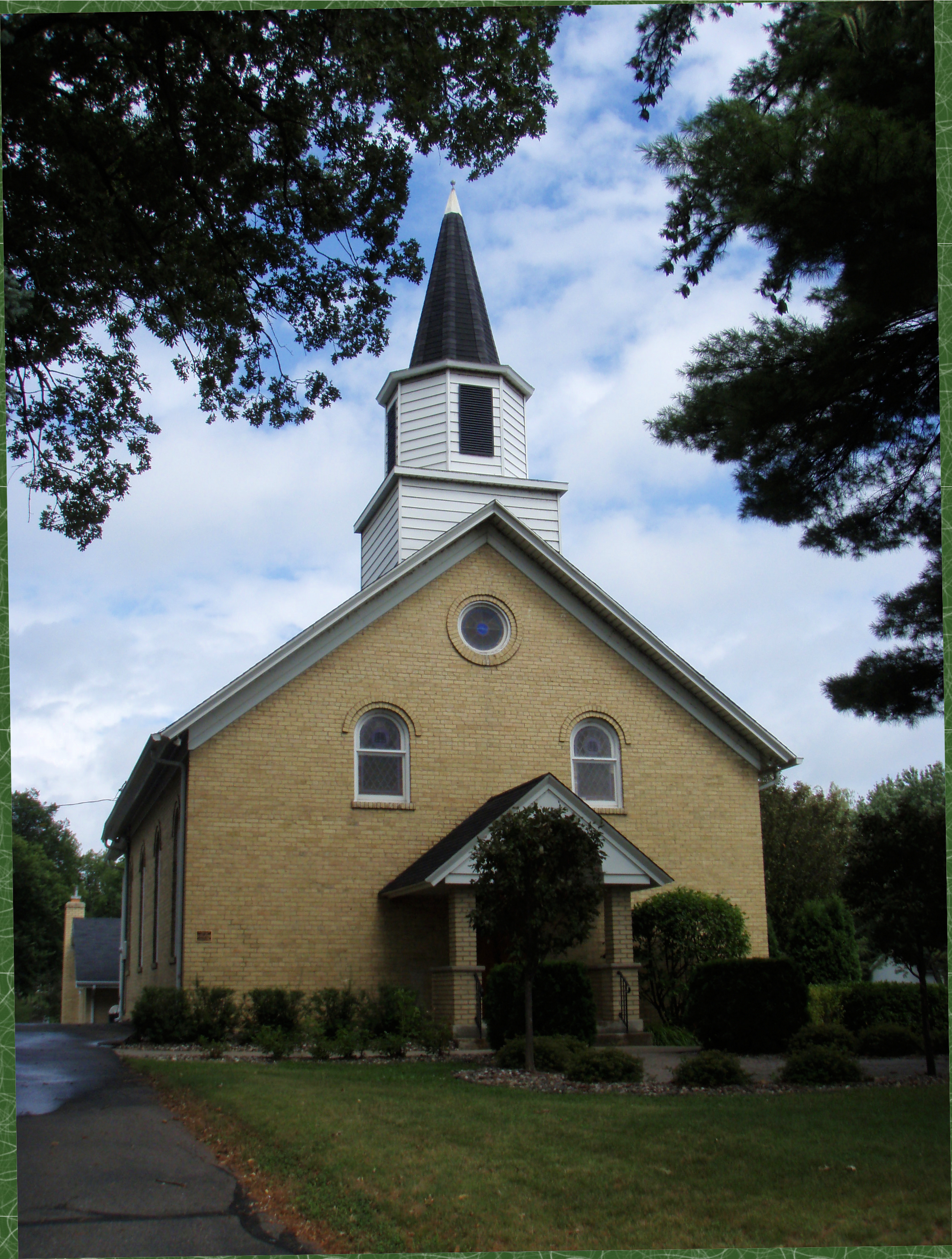

- Location within Minnesota Location within the United States
- Location: Victoria, Minnesota, United States
- Coordinates: 44°52′8″N 93°40′38″W
- Area: less than one acre
- Built: 1878
- MPS: Carver County MRA
- NRHP reference No.: 80001981
- Added to NRHP: January 4, 1980

Laketown Moravian Brethren's Church (also known as Lake Auburn Moravian Church) is a historic church on County Highway 11 in Victoria, Minnesota, United States.

The congregation was organized on October 31, 1858, at the house of John Holtmeier. In 1860 a log church was built on land that Holtmeier donated to the congregation. In 1878, a brick church was built near the previous site, at a cost of $2500, with 74 members in the congregation.

The church was added to the National Register of Historic Places in 1980. It was nominated for being a well-preserved example of rural vernacular religious architecture, marking a transition between the spartan frame designs of Carver County's earliest churches and its elaborate later churches of brick.

== See also ==
- Zoar Moravian Church: nearby church also on the NRHP
