= Victoria, Minnesota =

City in Minnesota, United States

Victoria
- City
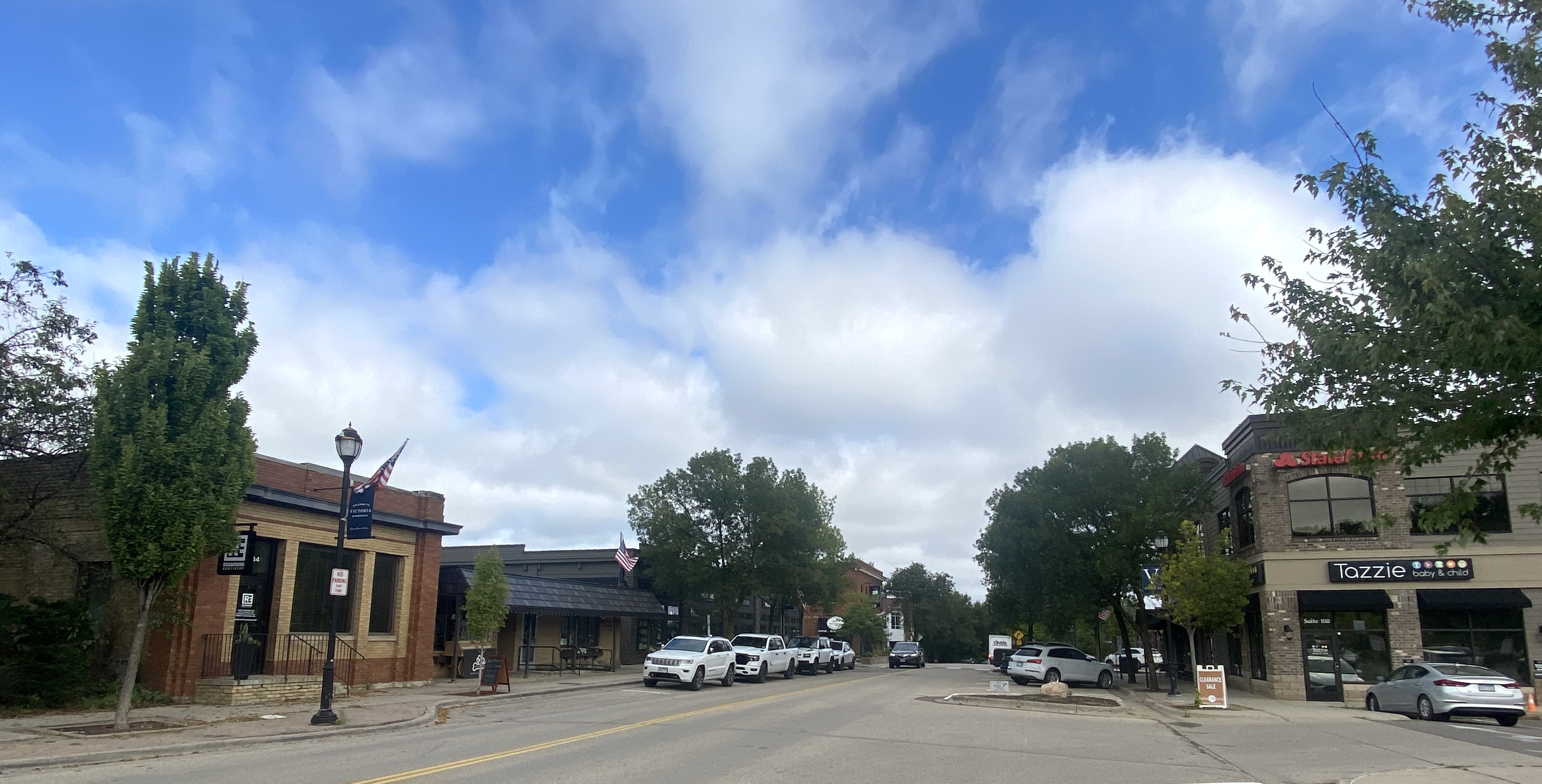
- Businesses on Victoria Drive

- Location of the city of Victoria within Carver County, Minnesota
- Coordinates: 44°51′51″N 93°38′57″W
- Country: United States
- State: Minnesota
- County: Carver

Area
  - Total: 10.70 sq mi (27.70 km^{2})
  - Land: 8.71 sq mi (22.57 km^{2})
  - Water: 1.98 sq mi (5.13 km^{2})
- Elevation: 958 ft (292 m)

Population (2020)
  - Total: 10,546
  - Estimate (2021): 11,042
  - Density: 1,210.4/sq mi (467.34/km^{2})
- Time zone: UTC-6 (CST)
  - Summer (DST): UTC-5 (CDT)
- ZIP code: 55386
- Area code: 952
- FIPS code: 27-67036
- GNIS feature ID: 2397135
- Website: ci.victoria.mn.us

Victoria is a city in Carver County, Minnesota, United States. The population was 10,546 at the 2020 census.

== History ==
Michael Diethelm is believed to be the first settler in Victoria after setting up a shelter for his wife and two children in 1851 near the present-day St. Victoria Church. The city is named after the church, built on 30 acres (120,000 m^{2}) of land just north of Lake Bavaria in 1857. A year later, steamboats from St. Paul began bringing additional supplies for early settlers. The settlement continued to grow as the rich soil attracted farmers. Also in 1858, the Laketown Moravian Brethren's Church was established and is now on the National Register of Historic Places. Eventually the steamboats to Chaska and the St. Paul railroad helped transform the area into a thriving community.

== Geography ==
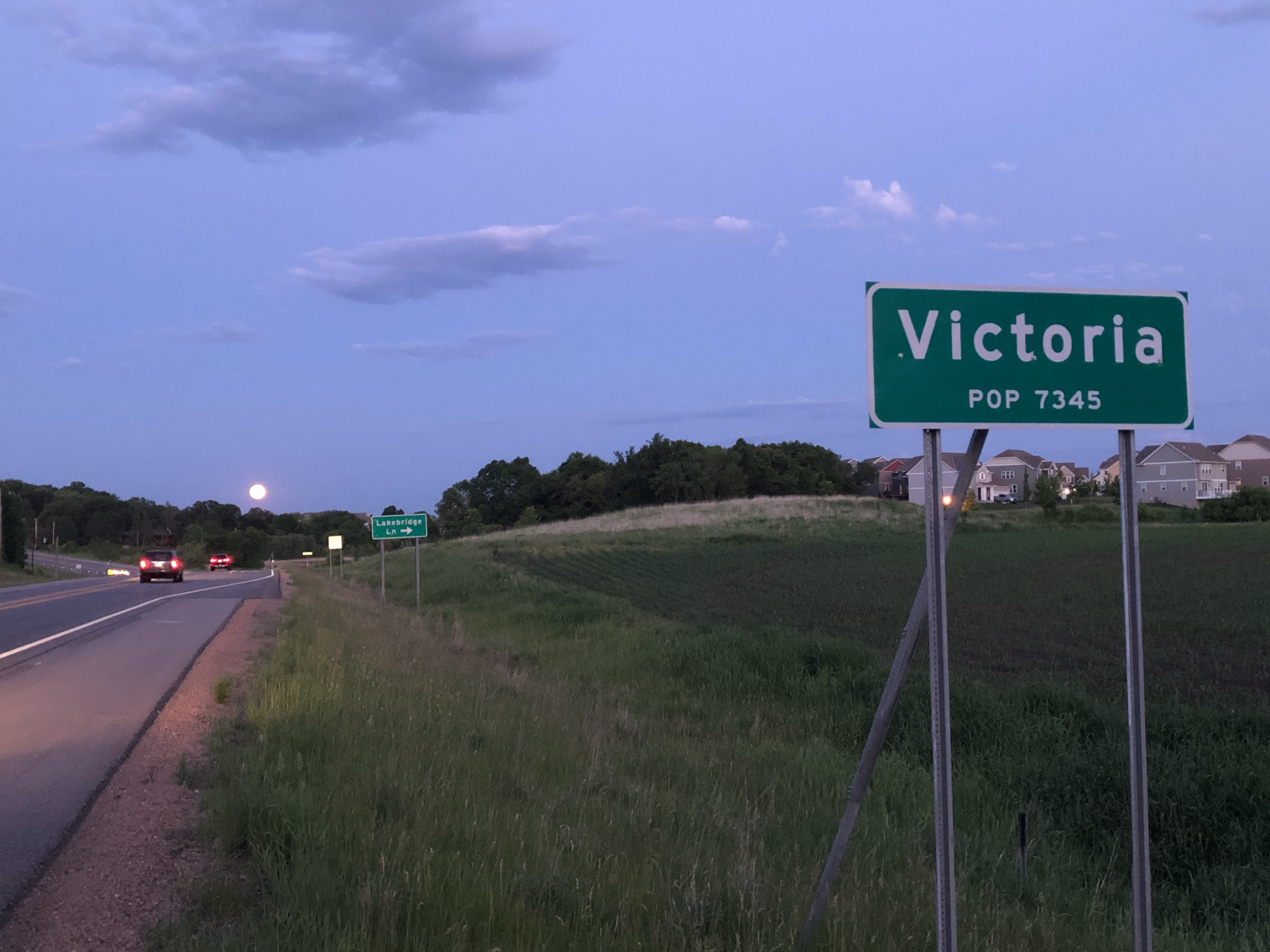
Looking east on MN 5 into Victoria

According to the United States Census Bureau, the city has an area of 9.79 square miles (25.36 km^{2}), of which 8.01 square miles (20.75 km^{2}) is land and 1.78 square miles (4.61 km^{2}) is water.

State Highways 5 and 7 are two of Victoria's main routes.

Victoria has been nicknamed "The City of Lakes and Parks" because it has over 200 acres (0.81 km^{2}) of reserved land, 25 parks, and thirteen lakes within its borders. Victoria is also home to the 1,800-acre (7.3 km^{2}) Carver Park Reserve.

In the 1850s, Victoria's rich soil attracted many farmers from Germany, Switzerland, and the Netherlands.

== Demographics ==
Historical population
Census	Pop.	Note	%±
1920	206		—
1930	240		16.5%
1940	276		15.0%
1950	302		9.4%
1960	425		40.7%
1970	850		100.0%
1980	1,425		67.6%
1990	2,354		65.2%
2000	4,025		71.0%
2010	7,345		82.5%
2020	10,546		43.6%
2021 (est.)	11,042		4.7%
U.S. Decennial Census; 2020 Census

=== 2020 census ===
As of the 2020 census, Victoria had a population of 10,546. The median age was 39.0 years. 30.1% of residents were under the age of 18 and 11.2% of residents were 65 years of age or older. For every 100 females there were 98.2 males, and for every 100 females age 18 and over there were 96.5 males age 18 and over.

96.4% of residents lived in urban areas, while 3.6% lived in rural areas.

There were 3,542 households in Victoria, of which 45.7% had children under the age of 18 living in them. Of all households, 75.7% were married-couple households, 8.5% were households with a male householder and no spouse or partner present, and 12.5% were households with a female householder and no spouse or partner present. About 13.3% of all households were made up of individuals and 5.6% had someone living alone who was 65 years of age or older.

There were 3,719 housing units, of which 4.8% were vacant. The homeowner vacancy rate was 2.2% and the rental vacancy rate was 2.9%.

Racial composition as of the 2020 census
Race	Number	Percent
White	9,653	91.5%
Black or African American	79	0.7%
American Indian and Alaska Native	12	0.1%
Asian	254	2.4%
Native Hawaiian and Other Pacific Islander	0	0.0%
Some other race	55	0.5%
Two or more races	493	4.7%
Hispanic or Latino (of any race)	227	2.2%

=== 2010 census ===
As of the census of 2010, 7,345 people, 2,435 households, and 2,055 families lived in the city. The population density was 917.0 inhabitants per square mile (354.1/km^{2}). There were 2,545 housing units at an average density of 317.7 per square mile (122.7/km^{2}). The racial makeup of the city was 95.6% White, 0.5% African American, 0.1% Native American, 2.0% Asian, 0.3% from other races, and 1.5% from two or more races. Hispanic or Latino of any race were 2.0% of the population.

There were 2,435 households, of which 49.4% had children under the age of 18 living with them, 76.7% were married couples living together, 5.4% had a female householder with no husband present, 2.3% had a male householder with no wife present, and 15.6% were non-families. 12.6% of all households were made up of individuals, and 4.3% had someone living alone who was 65 years of age or older. The average household size was 2.99 and the average family size was 3.27.

The median age in the city was 38.9 years. 32.9% of residents were under the age of 18; 4.5% were between the ages of 18 and 24; 25.5% were from 25 to 44; 28.6% were from 45 to 64; and 8.5% were 65 years of age or older. The gender makeup of the city was 49.7% male and 50.3% female.

=== 2000 census ===
As of the census of 2000, there were 4,025 people, 1,367 households, and 1,141 families living in the city. The population density was 575.4 inhabitants per square mile (222.2/km^{2}). There were 1,410 housing units at an average density of 201.6 per square mile (77.8/km^{2}). The racial makeup of the city was 97.91% White, 0.27% African American, 0.12% Native American, 0.84% Asian, 0.37% from other races, and 0.47% from two or more races. Hispanic or Latino of any race were 0.99% of the population.

There were 1,367 households, out of which 47.0% had children under the age of 18 living with them, 76.0% were married couples living together, 5.3% had a female householder with no husband present, and 16.5% were non-families. 11.3% of all households were made up of individuals, and 3.4% had someone living alone who was 65 years of age or older. The average household size was 2.90 and the average family size was 3.17.

In the city, the population was spread out, with 31.7% under the age of 18, 4.2% from 18 to 24, 33.5% from 25 to 44, 24.0% from 45 to 64, and 6.6% who were 65 years of age or older. The median age was 36 years. For every 100 females, there were 99.4 males. For every 100 females age 18 and over, there were 97.8 males.

The median income for a household in the city was $86,772, and the median income for a family was $91,681. Males had a median income of $60,931 versus $34,519 for females. The per capita income for the city was $38,929. About 1.3% of families and 2.3% of the population were below the poverty line, including 2.1% of those under age 18 and 2.2% of those age 65 or over.

== Government ==
United States presidential election results for Victoria, Minnesota
Year	Republican		Democratic		Third party(ies)	
Year	No.	%	No.	%	No.	%
1960	73	39.67%	110	59.78%	1	0.54%
1964	96	46.60%	110	53.40%	0	0.00%
1968	225	62.15%	123	33.98%	14	3.87%
1972	264	62.12%	144	33.88%	17	4.00%
1976	308	59.23%	193	37.12%	19	3.65%
1980	415	56.85%	245	33.56%	70	9.59%
1984	678	71.07%	276	28.93%	0	0.00%
1988	735	65.74%	383	34.26%	0	0.00%
1992	619	40.54%	444	29.08%	464	30.39%
1996	857	48.89%	680	38.79%	216	12.32%
2000	1,470	62.63%	782	33.32%	95	4.05%
2004	2,303	68.04%	1,057	31.23%	25	0.74%
2008	2,510	61.32%	1,527	37.31%	56	1.37%
2012	3,011	64.98%	1,574	33.97%	49	1.06%
2016	2,808	53.70%	1,968	37.64%	453	8.66%
2020	3,638	51.69%	3,243	46.08%	157	2.23%
2024	4,055	51.78%	3,614	46.15%	162	2.07%

== Education ==
There are three school districts with sections of Victoria: Eastern Carver County Public Schools (District 112), Minnetonka Public School District, and Waconia Public School District.

District 112 schools have an elementary school, Victoria Elementary.

Chanhassen High School serves the majority of Victoria.

Waconia Public Schools operates area public schools serving other parts of Victoria, including Waconia High School.

The city is home to the co-ed college preparatory high school Holy Family Catholic High School.

== Notable people ==
- Frank Ragnow, professional football player, born in Victoria
