= Swedenborgian Church of North America =

Christian sect based on Emanual Swedenborg's teachings

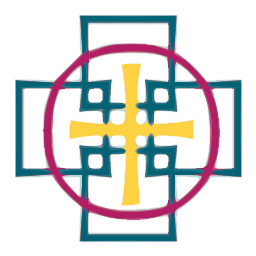
Cross of the Swedenborgian Church

The Swedenborgian Church in North America (also known as the General Convention of the Church of the New Jerusalem) is one of several New Church Christian sects which draws its faith from the Bible as illuminated by the teachings of Emanuel Swedenborg (1688–1772). The denomination's headquarters are on Quincy Street in Cambridge, Massachusetts.

== Beliefs ==
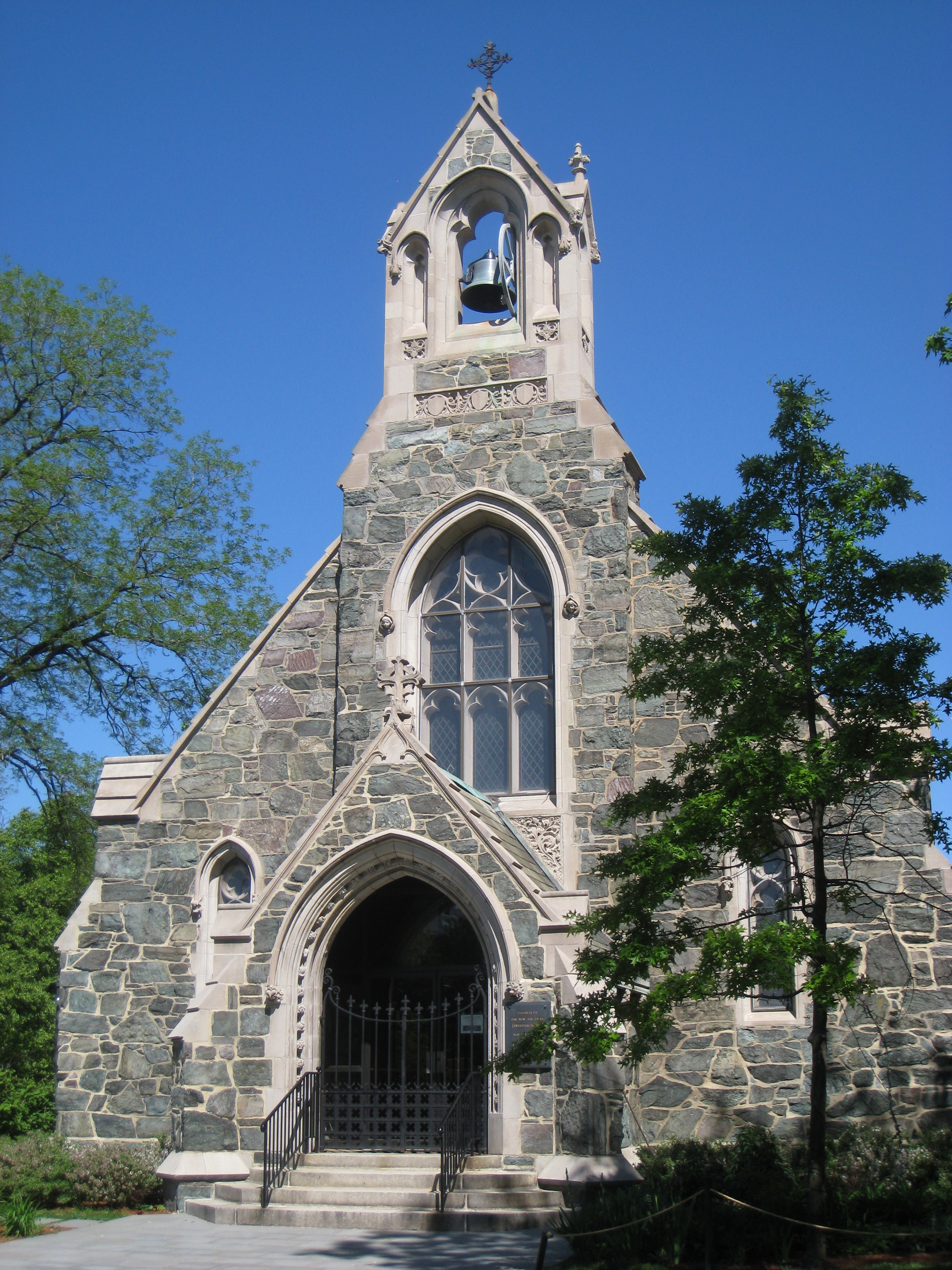
The historic Swedenborg Chapel near Harvard University serves as the denominational headquarters.

The church believes that the writings of Swedenborg expand upon a deeper understanding of the Christian bible. This new understanding began the second coming of Christ which is continually being manifested in spirit and truth rather than a physical appearance. The Swedenborgian Church of North America does not make any statements as to the exact authority of Swedenborg's writings on the Bible or to the correctness of either. Each Society and member is given the responsibility to arrive at their own conclusions, and the denomination allows for discussion and debate. Over time, their teachings have developed identifiably liberal positions on social issues and sexual ethics, such as the ordination of women, homosexuality, and abortion.

== Structure ==
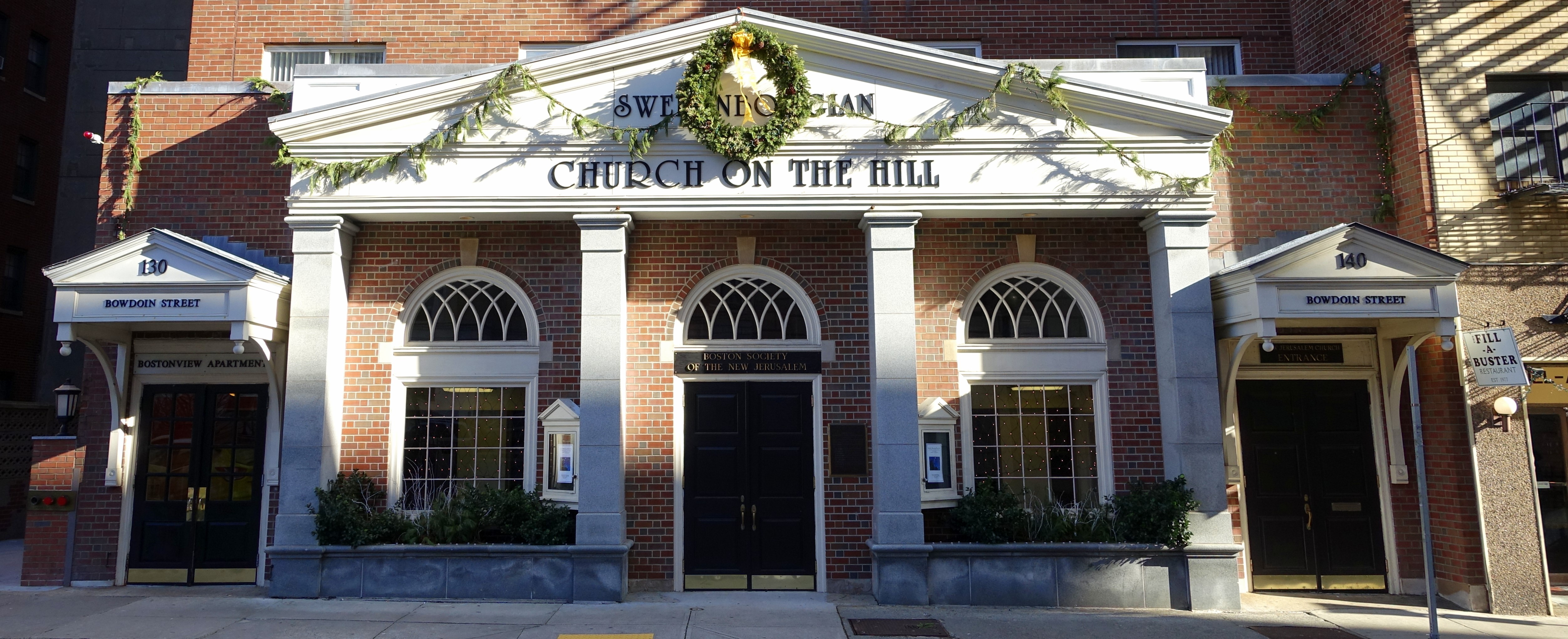
Church on the Hill, also called the Boston Society of the New Jerusalem, a Swedenborgian Church of North America center next to the Massachusetts State House.

The Swedenborgian Church has a congregational form of governance. Local churches, often called societies, form regional associations and those associations send delegates to an annual convention. The Center for Swedenborgian Studies operates as the denomination's theological training institution and seminary. The center is located at Graduate Theological Union in Berkeley, California. The church also operates an online church called Swedenborgian Community Online which provides weekly resources on its website and social media. In 2003, the Swedenborgian Church of North America had about 1,800 members, almost identical to the membership it had in 1981 but rather less than the 5,440 it had in 1925.

== Affiliations ==
The Swedenborgian Church in North America is one of the Four Church Organizations that comprise The New Church. It is a member of the National Council of Churches USA.

== Famous Swedenborgians ==
- Johnny Appleseed
- Daniel Burnham
- Helen Keller

== See also ==
- Church of the Open Word (Newtonville)
- Swedenborgianism
