= Church of the New Jerusalem (Cambridge, Massachusetts) =

Historic church in Massachusetts, United States

- U.S. National Register of Historic Places
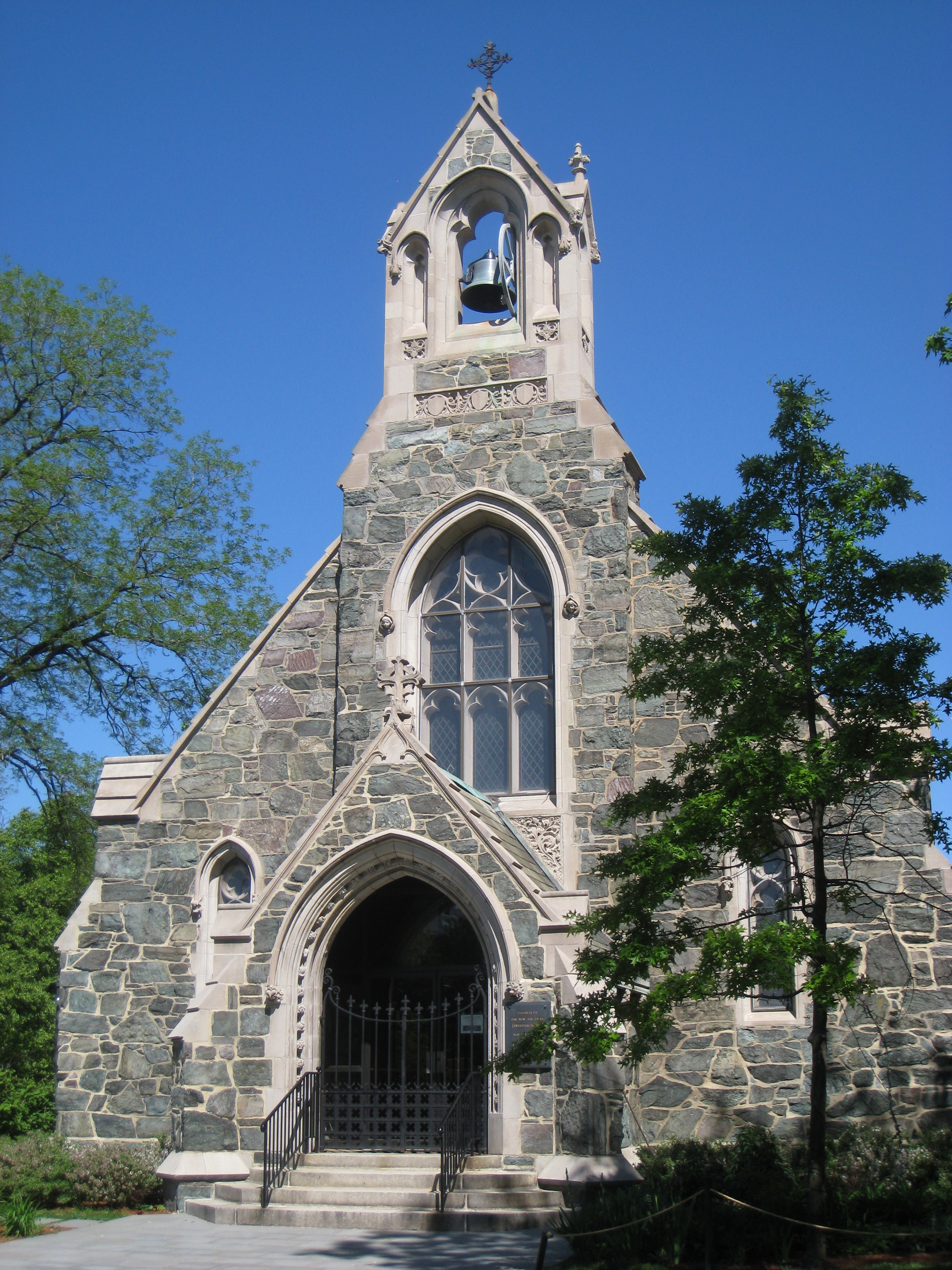

- Location within Massachusetts Location within the United States
- Location: Cambridge, Massachusetts
- Coordinates: 42°22′35.3″N 71°06′48.7″W
- Built: 1901
- Architect: Warren, Smith, & Biscoe
- Architectural style: Gothic
- MPS: Cambridge MRA
- NRHP reference No.: 83000792
- Added to NRHP: June 30, 1983

The Church of the New Jerusalem (also known as Swedenborg Chapel) is a historic Swedenborgian church at 50 Quincy Street, Cambridge, Massachusetts, near Harvard University. It was added to the National Register of Historic Places in 1983.

== History of building ==
The building was initially constructed in 1901 as a chapel to The New Church Theological School, which has moved to Berkeley, California and is doing business as the Swedenborgian House of Studies. It was designed by Herbert Langford Warren (1857–1917), founder of the Harvard School of Architecture (now the Harvard Graduate School of Design), a founding member of the Cambridge church, and son of a Swedenborgian missionary. It was built by the New Church Theological School on part of the Jared Sparks estate purchased in 1889 for the purpose of housing both a school and a Cambridge congregation of Swedenborgians. In 1965 a Parish House addition was constructed at the northeast corner of the chapel to designs by Cambridge architect Arthur H. Brooks, Jr. In 2002, the Swedenborg School of Religion sold the chapel to the Cambridge Society of the New Jerusalem, which was the incorporated congregation that had been with the chapel since its construction.

The building is a 1.5 story, gable-roofed, stone building in the English Gothic Revival style, constructed of rubblestone with Indiana limestone trim. The roof is green and purple slate. In plan, it is a rectangle, oriented east/west in the traditional manner of ecclesiastical architecture, entered through a one-story porch at the west end. On the west wall at either side of the porch are lancet windows with limestone hood moulds whose carved corbels represent the allegorical beasts of the four evangelists. The two lancets contain stained glass memorial windows representing "The Good Shepherd" and "Behold, I stand at the door and knock." The altar is located in a shallow, projecting one-story gabled chancel bay at the east end. Subsidiary projections include a shed roofed side entrance and chimney on the south elevation at the chancel crossing and a hip roofed projection on the north side that is now obscured by the 1965 Parish House addition. Limestone trim embellishes the exterior of the porch and the west wall.

== Congregation ==
The congregation dates back to the 1880s, but did not formally exist until the construction of the building in 1901. Since that time, Swedenborg Chapel has been served by 9 pastors. The Rev. Sage Cole is the current pastor of the congregation.

Past Pastors

1. The Rev. Dr. Theodore Wright
2. The Rev. William Worcester
3. The Rev. Everett Bray
4. The Rev. Dr. George F. Dole
5. The Rev. Mr. Wilfred Gould Rice
6. The Rev. F. Robert Tafel
7. The Rev. Sarah Buteux
8. The Rev. Kevin K. Baxter
9. The Rev. Sage Cole

Like many Swedenborgian churches, the chapel serves as an interfaith wedding chapel.

== See also ==
- National Register of Historic Places listings in Cambridge, Massachusetts
