= Lynda Goodsell Blake =

American missionary

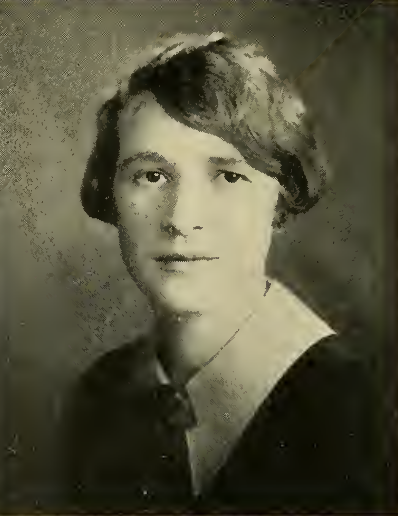
- Lynda Goodsell Blake, from the 1926 yearbook of Wellesley College
- Born: Lynda Irene Goodsell; October 22, 1906; Berlin, Germany
- Died: February 9, 1989 (aged 82); Auburndale, Massachusetts, United States
- Occupation(s): Congregational missionary and teacher in Turkey
- Years active: 1930s to 1970s

Lynda Irene Goodsell Blake (October 22, 1906 – February 9, 1989) was an American Christian missionary and educator, who taught at Turkish schools, including posts in Erenköy, Merzifon, and Izmir. She was principal at the American Collegiate Institute from 1948 to 1971.

== Early life and education ==
Lynda Goodsell was born in Berlin, Germany, the daughter of Fred Field Goodsell and Lulu (Lou) Service Goodsell; her parents were missionaries in Turkey, except during World War I when she lived in the United States. She attended the American College for Girls at Arnavutköy in Istanbul from 1920 to 1923, and graduated from Wellesley College in 1926. She earned a master's degree at the Pacific School of Religion in California in 1928. In the 1930s she took classes at the Boston University School of Music, and in 1955 she completed a master's degree in education at Boston University.

== Career ==
Blake followed in her parents' careers as a missionary teacher in Turkey, under the auspices of the American Board of Commissioners for Foreign Missions. She and her husband taught at schools in Erenköy, Goztepe, and Merzifon. They taught at the American Collegiate Institute, a girls' school in Izmir, from 1939 until they retired from the mission field in 1971. She was principal of the school at Izmir from 1948 to 1971. She spoke to church groups in the United States when she was on leave in 1936, 1945, 1951, and 1958.

Blake received an honorary doctorate from Doane College in Nebraska in 1968. She chaired her Wellesley College class's 50th reunion preparations from 1974 to 1976.

== Personal life ==
Lynda Goodsell married Rev. Everett Carll (Jack) Blake in 1927. They had three children together, John, Lincoln, and Jacklyn. Lynda Goodsell Blake died from cancer in 1989, at the age of 82, in Auburndale, Massachusetts. The Blake and Goodsell Family Papers are in the collection of the Congregational Library and Archives in Boston.
