= Zoar Moravian Church =

Historic church in Minnesota, United States

- U.S. National Register of Historic Places
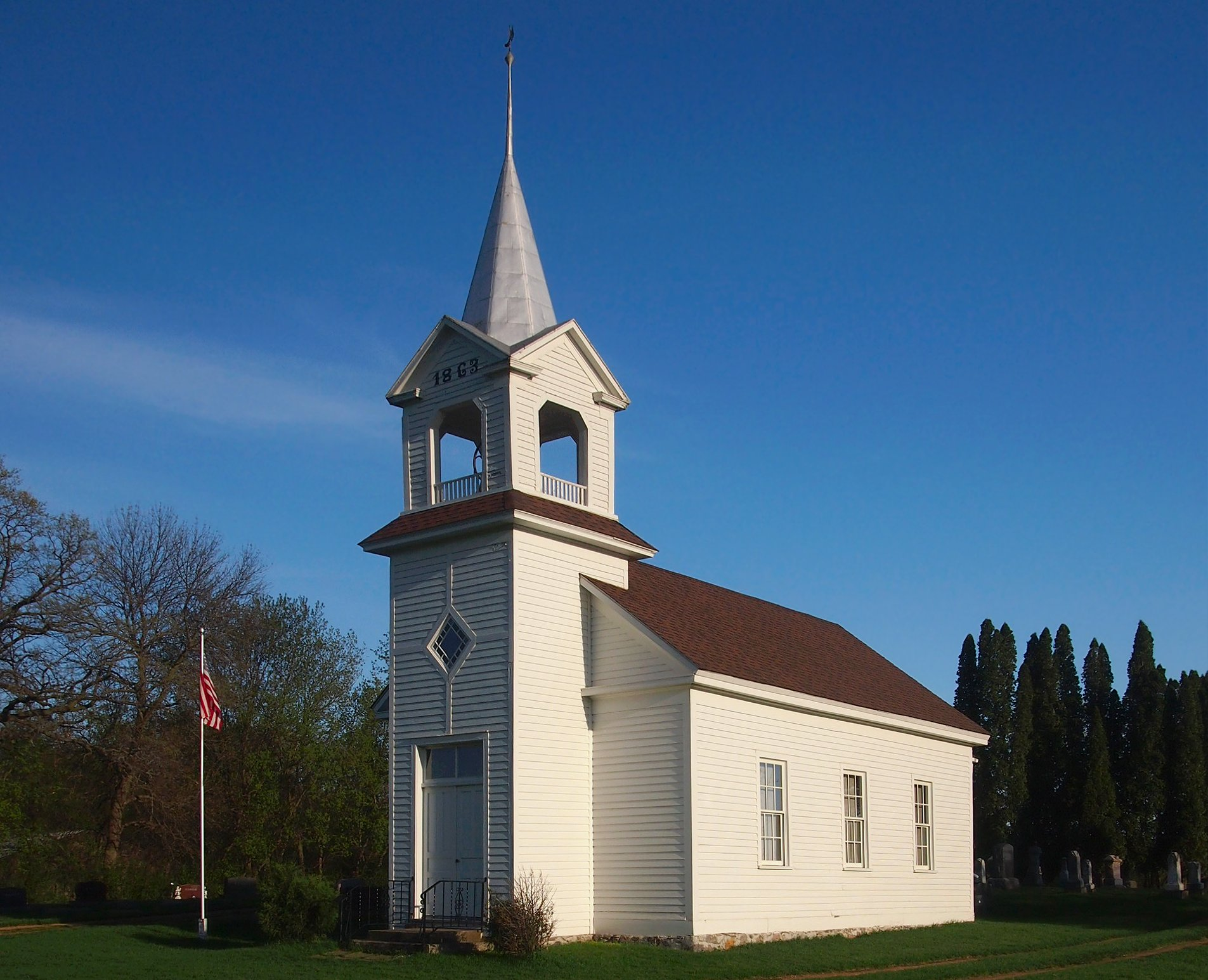
- The Zoar Moravian Church from the northwest

- Location within Minnesota Location within the United States
- Location: 8265 County Highway 10, Laketown Township, Minnesota
- Coordinates: 44°49′6.7″N 93°43′50.7″W
- Area: 2 acres (0.81 ha)
- Built: 1863
- Architectural style: Greek Revival
- MPS: Carver County MRA
- NRHP reference No.: 80001985
- Added to NRHP: January 4, 1980

Zoar Moravian Church (The Zoar Church) is a historic church in Laketown Township, Minnesota, United States, near the city of Waconia, Minnesota. It was built in 1863 by a congregation of immigrants from Hopedale, Pennsylvania. It is built in a Greek Revival style, typical of other early public buildings in Minnesota. The steeple was moved forward in 1908 to create a bell tower. The congregation disbanded in the 1940s, but the church is maintained and used by the Waconia Moravian Church.

The church was added to the National Register of Historic Places in 1980.

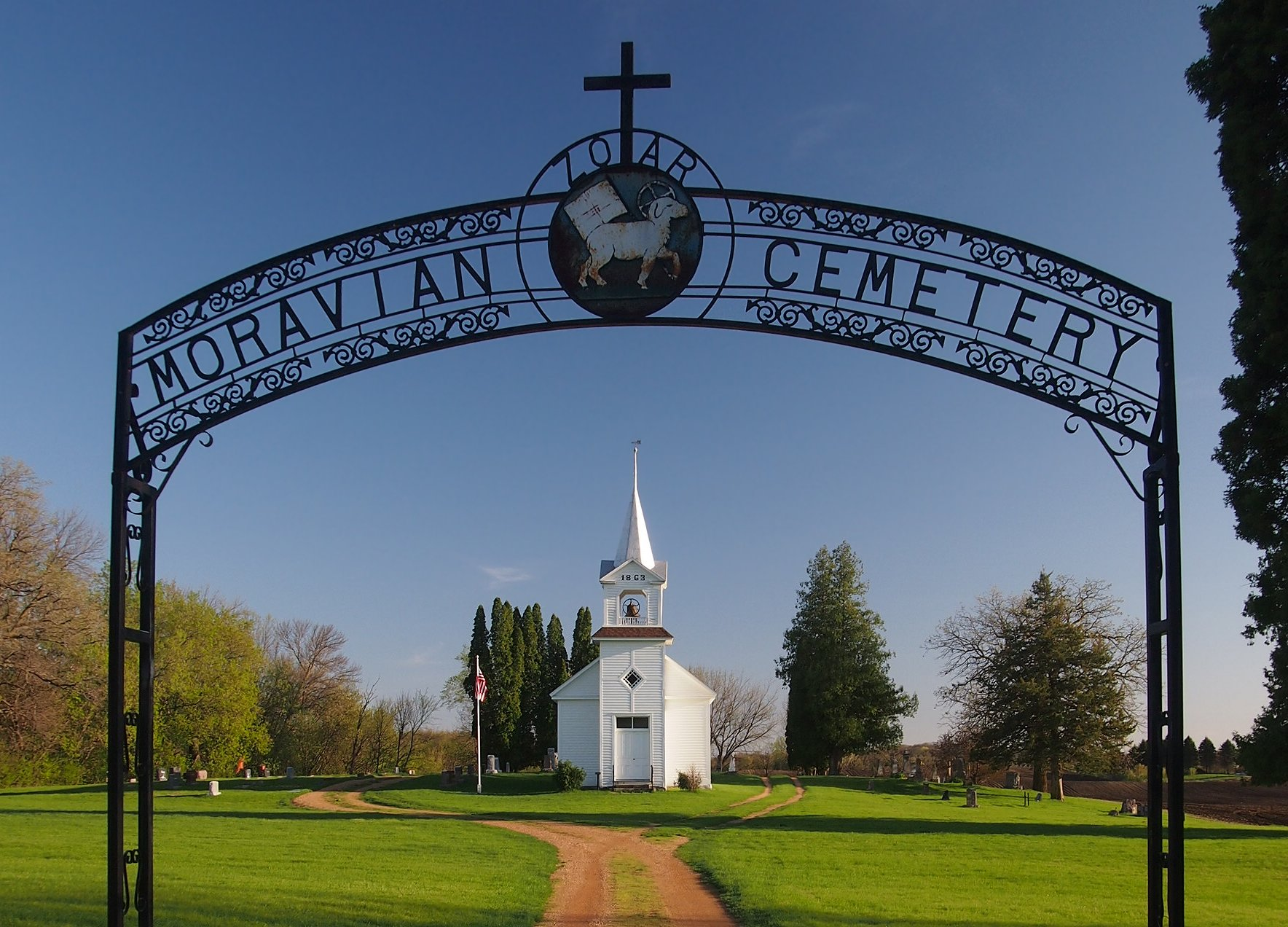
Zoar Moravian Church and cemetery gate

== See also ==
- Laketown Moravian Brethren's Church
- National Register of Historic Places listings in Carver County, Minnesota
