= Center for Swedenborgian Studies =

Coordinates: 37°52′34.98″N 122°15′47.51″W

The Center for Swedenborgian Studies (formerly called the New Church Theological School or NCTS and also previously known as the Swedenborgian House of Studies) is the seminary of the Swedenborgian Church of North America at the Graduate Theological Union in Berkeley, California. It offers a Certificate in Swedenborgian Studies and a Certificate in Swedenborgian Ministry Studies. It also functions as a think-tank for Swedenborgian studies globally.

The Center for Swedenborgian Studies or CSS (formerly called New Church Theological School or NCTS and also previously known as Swedenborgian House of Studies) is the theological training institution for the Swedenborgian Church of North America.

== History of the School ==
The New Church Theological School (NCTS) was located on the northern edge of Harvard College's campus in Cambridge, MA. In the mid 1960s it sold its building to Harvard University (for the Graduate School of Design) and relocated to 48 Sargent Street in Newton, MA. While it was housed in Newton, the school was known as the "Swedenborg School of Religion". After 35 years, the school relocated to the campus of Pacific School of Religion (PSR). From 2001-2015, the NCTS (formerly dba Swedenborg School of Religion) partnered with PSR.

In 2015 the school was renamed the Center for Swedenborgian Studies and it affiliated with the Graduate Theological Union (GTU). It continues to be physically located at and share faculty with PSR and PSR itself is one of the long-time member schools of the GTU. The CSS also offers studies in New Religious Movements, Western esotericism, and mysticism.

== Certifications and Programs ==
One of the reasons the school physically moved to PSR/GTU was that it could then partner locally with the well-established schools of the GTU that offered myriad courses and degrees especially including M.Div. (Masters of Divinity) degrees. However the CSS also offers distance learning options allowing students to attend accredited schools throughout North America for academic and professional certification. The CSS can then focus its energy on Swedenborgian Studies scholarship and training.

Certificate of Swedenborgian Studies (Academic): The CSS is a 6-course certificate program for current GTU M.A. and Ph.D. students. It is also available to M.Div. students currently at one of the GTU member schools or non-GTU scholars who are not preparing for a vocation in the Swedenborgian Church.

Certificate of Swedenborgian Ministries Studies (Vocational): The CSMS comprises 21 units of coursework (or 7 3-unit courses), of which:

- 6 units must be Swedenborgian Exegesis,
- 3 units must be Introduction to Swedenborgian Thought, and
- 3 units must be Swedenborgian History.
- The other nine units may be drawn from any other courses offered in Swedenborgian Studies.

== About the Faculty ==
The regular faculty are responsible for the Swedenborgian course offerings, but also partner with the faculty of the Graduate Theological Union and Pacific School of Religion to teach core curriculum classes to the larger student body.

Faculty
Rev. Dr. James F. Lawrence, Dean
Dr. Rebecca K. Esterson, Assistant Professor in Sacred Texts and Traditions and Dorothea Harvey Professor of Swedenborgian Studies
Dr. Devin Phillip Zuber, Assistant Professor of American Studies, Religion, and Literature
Adjunct Faculty
Rev. Dr. George F. Dole, Adjunct Professor of Biblical Studies
