= Tell en-Nasbeh =

Archaeological site north of Jerusalem

- تل النصبة תל א-נצבא
- Mizpah
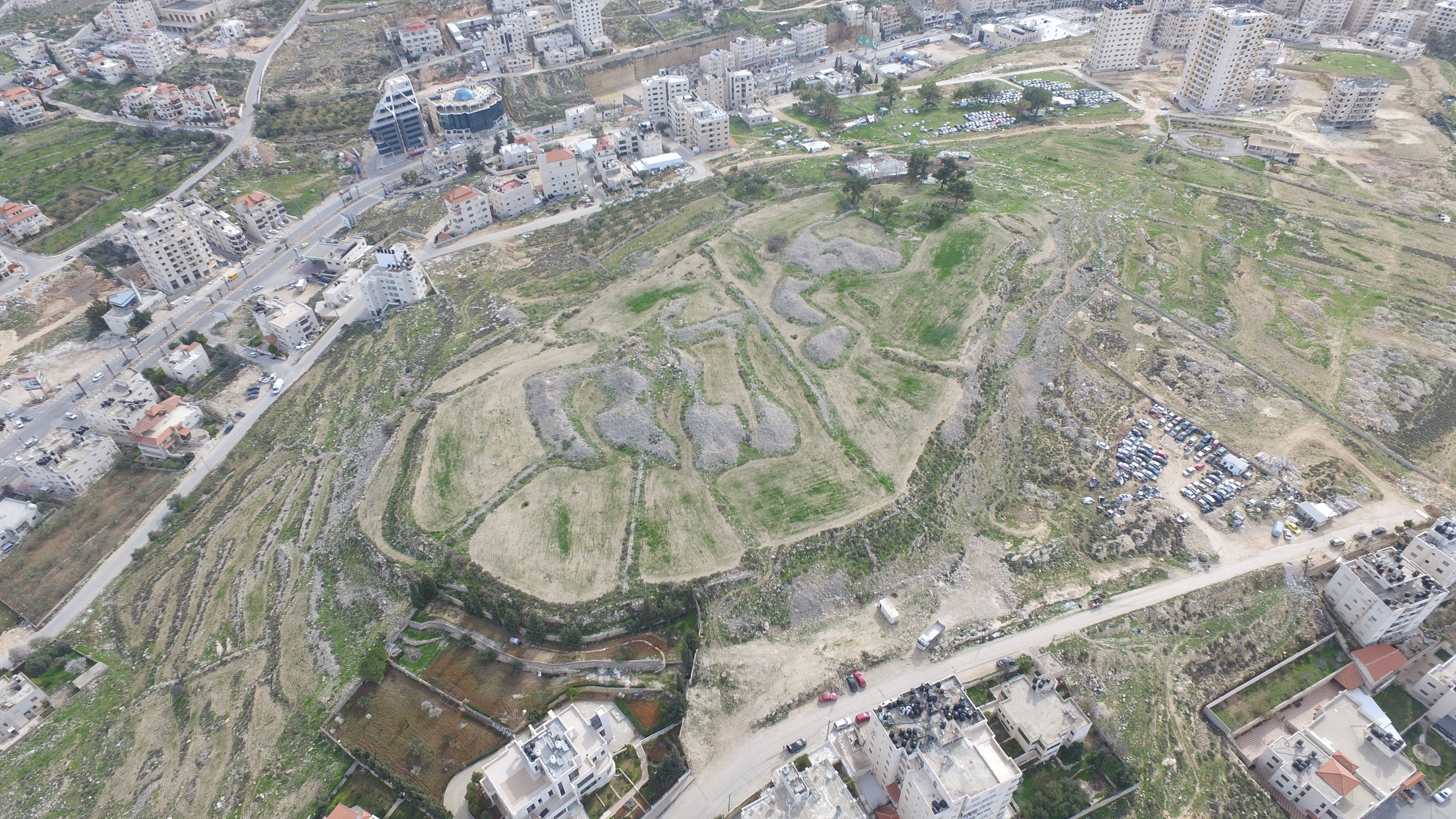
- Aerial view of Tell en-Nasbeh

- Location within the West Bank
- 31.885136°N 35.216417°E
- Type: settlement
- Periods: Iron Age II – Byzantine period
- Cultures: Canaanite, Israelite, Second Temple Judaism
- Location: Ramallah and al-Bireh Governorate
- Region: West Bank

Site notes
- Excavation dates: 1926-1935
- Archaeologists: William Badè
- Condition: In ruins

Tell en-Nasbeh, possibly the biblical city of Mizpah, is a 3.2 hectare (8 acre) tell located on a low plateau 12 kilometers (7.5 mi) northwest of Jerusalem in the West Bank.

== History ==
The site lies adjacent to an ancient roadway connecting Jerusalem with the northern hill country, which is how Tell en-Nasbeh gained importance as Judah's northern border fortress during its prime phase of occupation in the Iron Age II (Strata 3A-C; 1000–586 BCE). There are also archaeological remains at the site and in surrounding cave tombs that have been dated to the Early Bronze I (Stratum 5; 3500–3300 BCE), Iron I (Stratum 4; 1200–1000 BCE), Babylonian and Persian (Stratum 2; 586–323 BCE), Hellenistic, Roman and Byzantine Periods (Stratum 1; 323 BCE – 630 CE).

=== Early Bronze ===
==== Early Bronze I ====
Tell en-Nasbeh (Stratum 5, EB I, 3500-3300 BCE) was a small village in the Late Chalcolithic and Early Bronze I periods. It was then abandoned until the beginning of the Iron Age.

=== Iron Age ===
==== Iron I ====
Tell en-Nasbeh (Stratum 4, Iron I, 1200-1000 BCE). The settlement started to develop again after a long period of abandonment. Around the 10th century BCE it had become a sizable agricultural village.

==== Iron II ====
Tell en-Nasbeh (Stratum 3A-C, Iron II, 1000-586 BCE). By Iron Age IIA (9th–8th centuries BCE), it was a walled settlement with a massive city gate, on the frontier between the southern and northern Israelite kingdoms. Archaeologist William G. Dever estimates the city's population to have been between 500 and 1,000 people during this period.

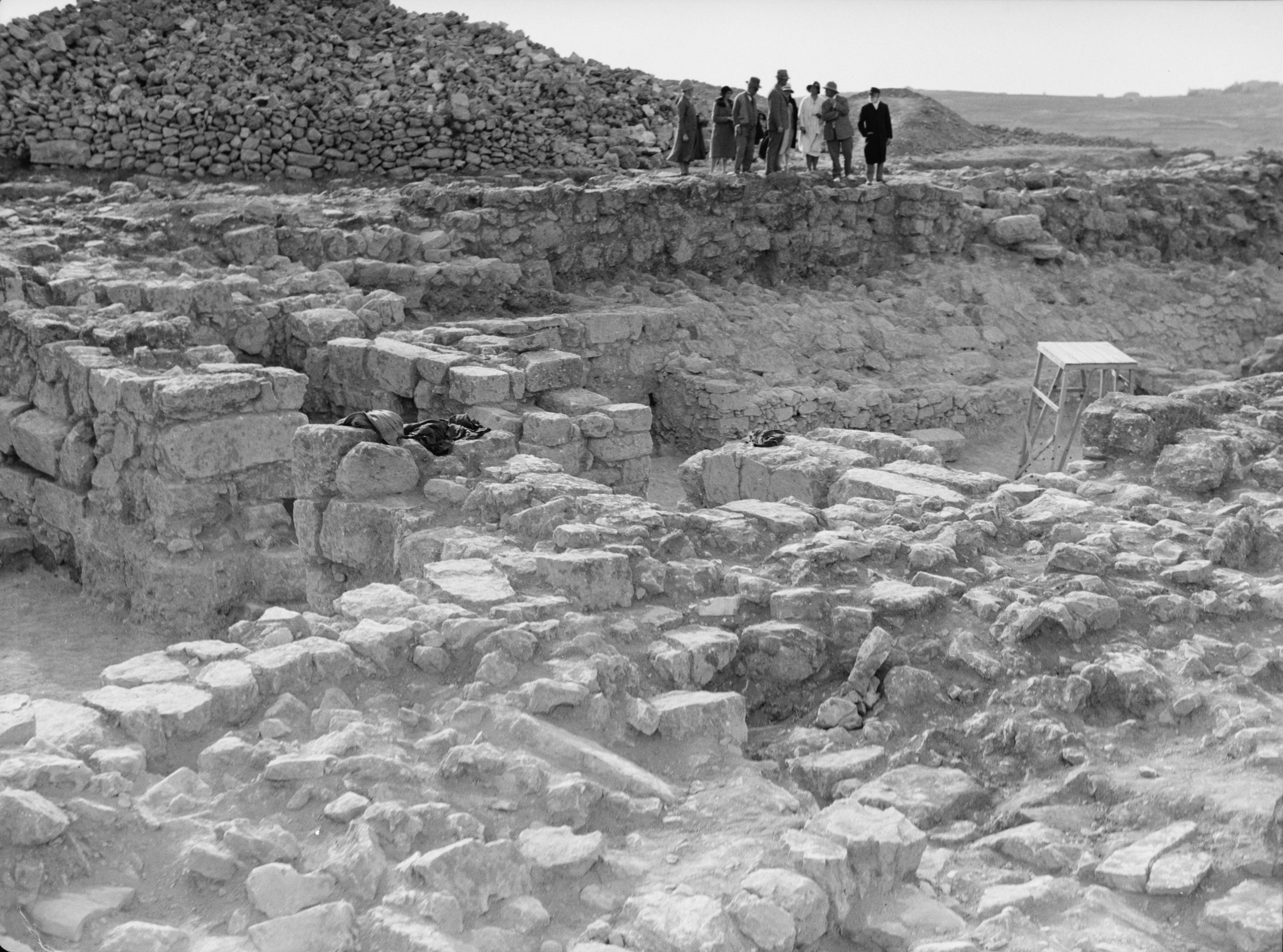
Iron Age city gate, similar in design to other Israelite city gates of the same period

=== Babylonian and Persian periods ===
Tell en-Nasbeh Stratum 2 (Babylonian, Persian periods 585-323 BCE). During the Jewish–Babylonian War, the area to the north of Jerusalem yielded to the Babylonians without a battle, according to archaeological evidence and other indications in the Hebrew Bible. After the destruction of Jerusalem by Nebuchadnezzar II in 587/6 BCE, Mizpah became the administrative center for the district of Binyamin in Judah. According to a study done by Tel Aviv University, Tell en-Nasbeh survived the Babylonian campaign and rose to prominence in the sixth century BCE as the most important settlement nearby.

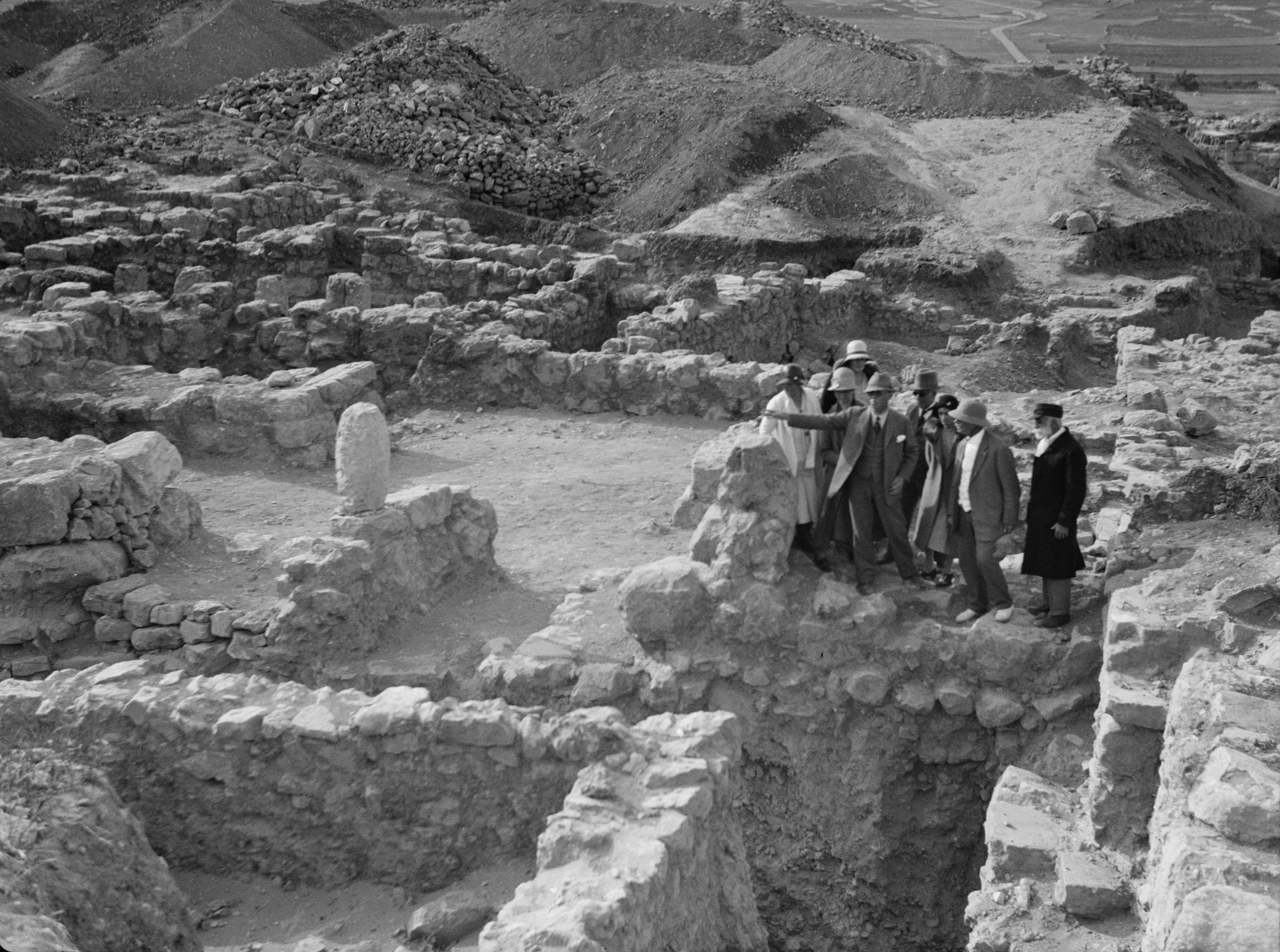
Sanctuary dedicated to Astarte appears on the left

=== Hellenistic period ===
Tell en-Nasbeh Stratum 1 (Hellenistic, Roman, Byzantine, 323 BC-630 AD). Pottery, coins, and other small finds indicate Tell en-Nasbeh was still occupied by the Hellenistic Period when according to the Hebrew Bible Judas Maccabeus gathered his army at Mizpah to confront the Seleucid army. Later finds, including a tower, tombs in the extramural cemeteries, and the floor of a Byzantine church near the western cemetery, speak to some occupation in later periods.

== Excavations ==
The site was excavated over 5 seasons between 1926 and 1935 by William Frederic Badè of the Pacific School of Religion in Berkeley, CA. The project was jointly sponsored by the Pacific School of Religion (PSR) and the American Schools of Oriental Research (ASOR), and represents one of the earliest scientific excavations in region. After Badè's untimely death in 1936, his colleagues compiled and published a 2-volume final report for the excavation. During the cleaning in preparation for publication a semi-circular bronze circlet was found to contain a fragmentary cuneiform inscription. Though the transliteration was not certain a proposed translation was "... ]-yada',his very own son, for the well-being of his life dedi[cated ...".

The original dig records, specifically the stratigraphic evidence, were later re-analyzed and published by Jeffrey R. Zorn of Cornell University. Research of the Tell en-Nasbeh collection continues today, both by staff of the Badè Museum of Biblical Archaeology at the Pacific School of Religion (formerly the Palestine Institute, then Badè Institute of Biblical Archaeology) and by outside scholars from around the world.

Museum staff are also involved in a huge multi-year project to digitize over 5,800 objects that comprise the Tell en-Nasbeh collection. This project, based in Open Context, is in collaboration with staff of the Alexandria Archive Institute in San Francisco, CA.
