= Mizpah in Benjamin =

Biblical city of the tribe of Benjamin

Coordinates: 31°53′07″N 35°12′59″E

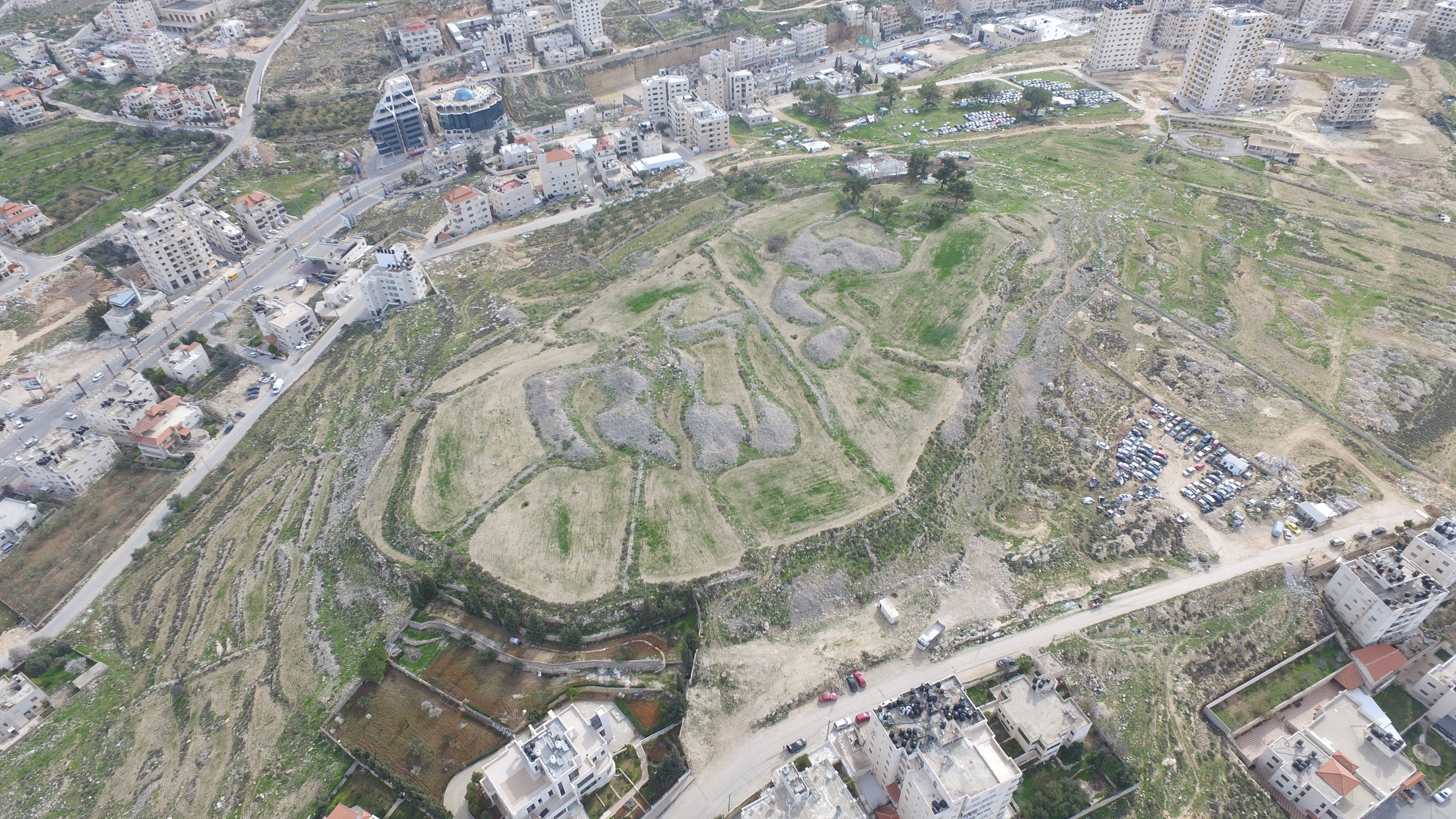
Tell en-Nasbeh, an archaeological site commonly identified with Mitzpah in Benjamin

Mitzpah (Hebrew: מִצְפָּה, romanized: miṣpā, lit. 'watchtower, lookout') was a city of the tribe of Benjamin; it is referred to multiple times in the Hebrew Bible.

Tell en-Nasbeh is one of three sites often identified with the Mitzpah of Benjamin, and is located about 12 kilometres (7.5 mi) north of Jerusalem. The other suggested locations are Nabi Samwil, which is some 8 kilometres (5.0 mi) northwest of the Old City of Jerusalem (situated on the highest hill in the vicinity, above the plain of Gibeon), and Shuafat, a village situated on a flat spur to the northwest of Jerusalem and from where Jerusalem is visible.

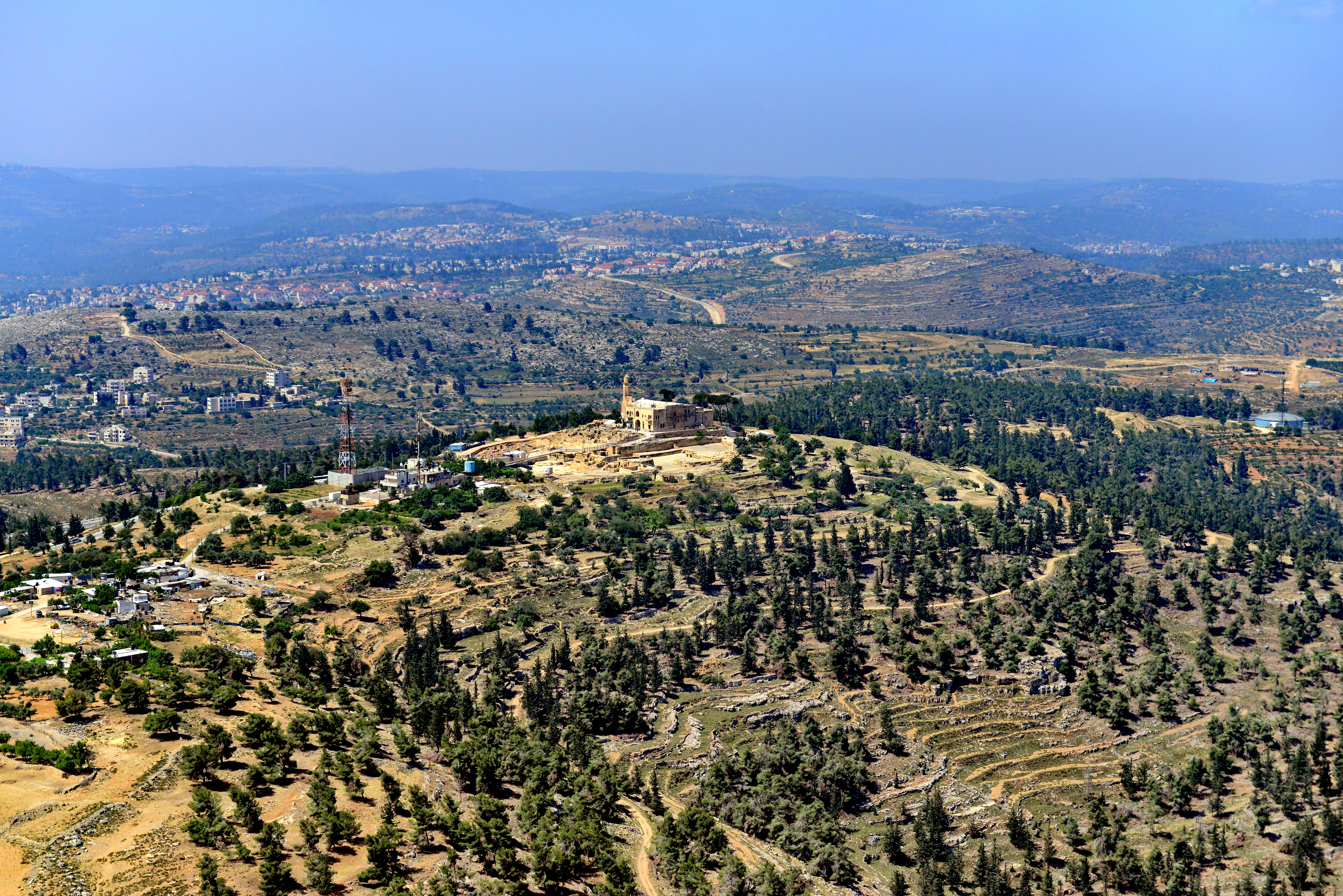
Nabi Samwil, another suggested location

== Biblical references ==
The first mention of a Mizpah (although this Mizpah is in Gilead, southeast of the Sea of Galilee) was in the Book of Genesis where Laban and his son-in-law Jacob made an agreement that God will watch over them while they were apart from each other. The piling of rocks marked it. It was a reminder of peace where each would not go beyond these rocks to attack the other.

In the incident of the Levite's concubine, the men of Gibeah raped a woman. The other Israelite tribes met at the Mizpah of Benjamin, where they decided to attack the Benjaminites for this grievous sin according to Judges 20:1–11. At the same time, the decision was made to ban the marriage of Benjaminite men to Israelite women.

After the return of the Ark of the Covenant, lost to the Philistines following the Israelites' defeat at the Battle of Aphek, Samuel gathered all Israel at Mizpah to offer a sacrifice to God and ask Him to forgive their sin. The Israelites fought off a raid by the Philistines, taking advantage of the assembly, and drove them back below Beth Car. To memorialize this event, Samuel set up a stone between Mizpah and Shen and named it Eben-Ezer ("Stone of Help") because the Lord had helped them.

Samuel also gathered the people of Israel to Mizpah for the Lord to identify their first king. There, Saul was chosen by lot from all the tribes and families of Israel.

During the reigns of King Asa of Judah and King Baasha of Israel, Mizpah was one of two cities which Asa built up from the stones Baasha had used to fortify Ramah (1 Kings 15, 1 Kings 15:22; 2 Chronicles 16, 2 Chronicles 16:6).

After the Babylonians destroyed Jerusalem, they appointed Gedaliah governor in Mizpah over the remaining residents. Many returned to Mizpah from where they had fled. The prophet Jeremiah came to Mizpah from Ramah in Benjamin, where the Babylonians had released him. Later, Ishmael, a member of the royal family, assassinated Gedaliah. Despite Jeremiah's warning that the people would be accused and die if they went to Egypt, they persisted in going there.

Mizpah is mentioned in the Book of Nehemiah as one of the towns resettled by the Jewish exiles returning from the Babylonian captivity and who helped to construct the walls of Jerusalem during the reign of Artaxerxes I (Xerxes). Nehemiah further records that those returnees were the very descendants of the people who had formerly resided in the town before their banishment from the country, who had all returned to live in their former places of residence.

== Identification ==
The leading contenders for the site of Mizpah are Tell en-Nasbeh, nearby Nabi Samwil, and Shuafat.

- The suggested site of Shuafat is based on its etymology, meaning "prospect," which is thought to be a corruption of the old name Mitzpah or Sapha. In addition, the place fits the description of being "over against Jerusalem" (I Macc. III 46)
- Yohanan Aharon suggested identifying Tell en-Nasbeh with Mitzpah in Benjamin.
- Mitzpah was located right next to Gibeon. If Mitzpah was Tell en-Nasbeh on the Nablus Road, Ishmael would not have fled to Ammon via Gibeon, which is located to the west near Nabi Samwil, which overlooks Jerusalem.
- Mizpah is where Judas Maccabeus and his rebel army camped before the Battle of Emmaus during the Maccabean Revolt according to the book of 1 Maccabees 3:46. "Then they gathered together and went to Mizpah, opposite Jerusalem, because Israel formerly had a place of prayer in Mizpah." Mizpah was in the hills, while the nearby Greek Syrian camp in Emmaus was on the plain. Judas proceeded to hold a religious ceremony at Mitzpah, where he picked a smaller force to ambush the Seleucid camp the next day.
- Nabi Samwil has produced no remains from Iron Age I, nor any remains of the 6th century BCE, both periods in which Mitzpah was occupied. By contrast, Tell en-Nasbeh has produced abundant remains from both periods, and has a massive fortification system which matches well with the building campaign of King Asa of Judah in the early 9th century BC. Its location on the main road leading out of Jerusalem fits well with the reference to Mizpah in 1 Kings 15:22.
