= Ezekiel 14 =

Book of Ezekiel, chapter 14

- ← chapter 13 chapter 15 →
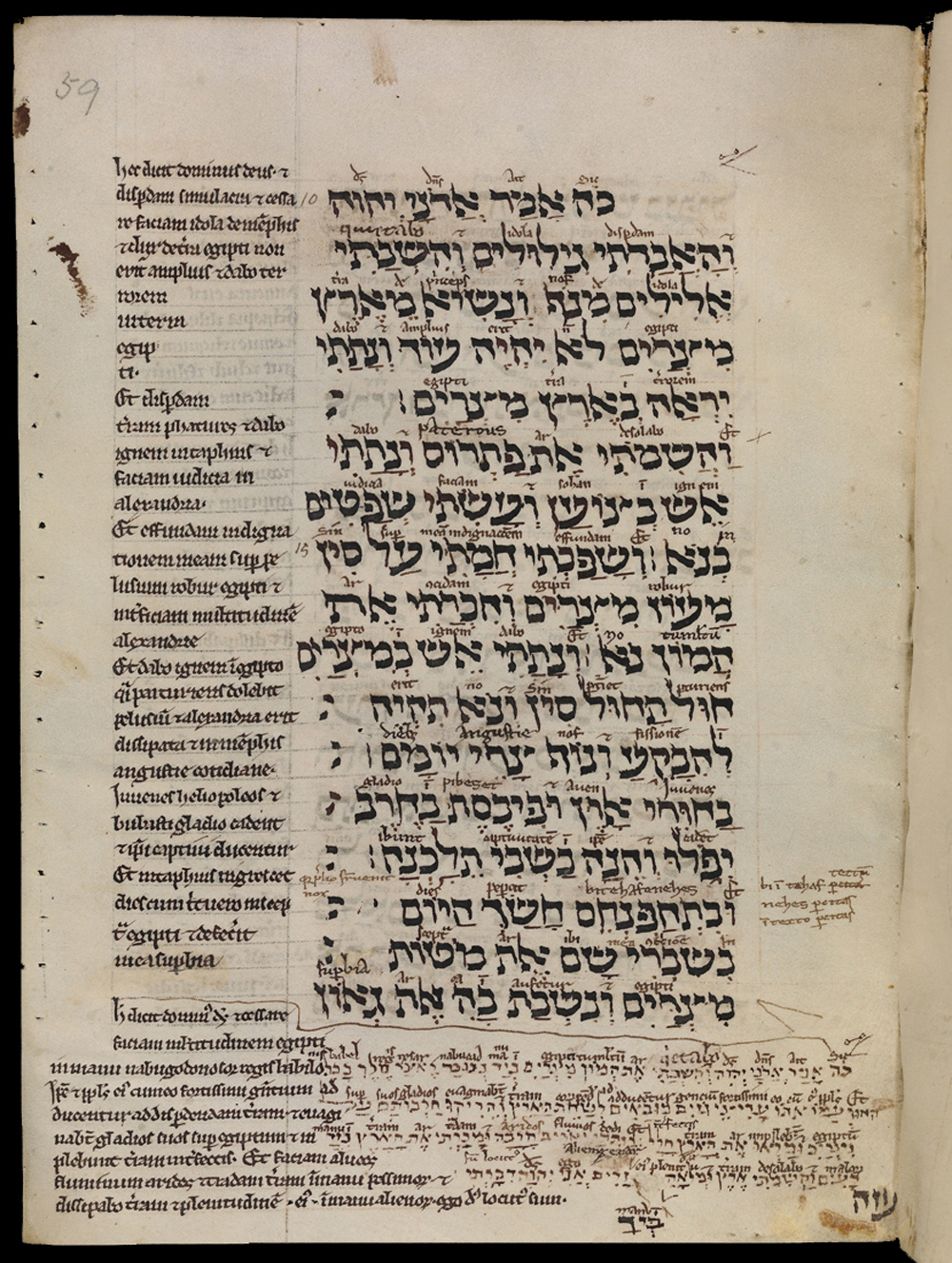
- Book of Ezekiel 30:13–18 in an English manuscript from the early 13th century, MS. Bodl. Or. 62, fol. 59a. A Latin translation appears in the margins with further interlineations above the Hebrew.
- Book: Book of Ezekiel
- Hebrew Bible part: Nevi'im
- Order in the Hebrew part: 7
- Category: Latter Prophets
- Christian Bible part: Old Testament
- Order in the Christian part: 26

Ezekiel 14 is the fourteenth chapter of the Book of Ezekiel in the Hebrew Bible or the Old Testament of the Christian Bible. This book contains the prophecies attributed to the prophet/priest Ezekiel, and is one of the Books of the Prophets. This chapter records a visit of some of the elders of Israel to Ezekiel, and God's response through the prophet dealing with the sins of idolatry.

== Text ==
The original text was written in the Hebrew language. This chapter is divided into 23 verses.

=== Textual witnesses ===
Some early manuscripts containing the text of this chapter in Hebrew are of the Masoretic Text tradition, which includes the Codex Cairensis (895), the Petersburg Codex of the Prophets (916), Aleppo Codex (10th century), Codex Leningradensis (1008).

There is also a translation into Koine Greek known as the Septuagint, made in the last few centuries BC. Extant ancient manuscripts of the Septuagint version include Codex Vaticanus (B; $\mathfrak{G}$^{B}; 4th century), Codex Alexandrinus (A; $\mathfrak{G}$^{A}; 5th century) and Codex Marchalianus (Q; $\mathfrak{G}$^{Q}; 6th century). (Note: Ezekiel is missing from the extant Codex Sinaiticus.)

== The idolatrous elders (14:1–11) ==
A group of elders approached Ezekiel (cf. Ezekiel 8:1 and 20:1) to 'enquire' of YHWH, which is a traditional practice of using the prophet as mediator to convey specific questions to YHWH (cf. Judges 18:5). YHWH told Ezekiel that he refuses to hear in the enquiry 'because of the seriousness of the elders' idolatry' (cf. 20:3–4) and 'the elders are not condemned simply for idolatry, but for 'lifting up' their idols 'into their hearts' (cf. the Jerusalem elders in 8:9–12, who maintained secret 'picture rooms' inside the temple itself). YHWH only responded by warning the elders 'to turn back from idolatry or suffer death at his hands' (verses 6–8), and if a prophet should deliver a response to the idolater's enquiry, YHWH would then destroy the prophet as well as the enquirer.

=== Verse 3 ===
Son of man, these men have set up their idols in their heart,

and put the stumblingblock of their iniquity before their face:

should I be enquired of at all by them?

- "Son of man" (Hebrew: בן־אדם ḇen-’ā-ḏām): this phrase is used 93 times to address Ezekiel.
- "Idols" (Hebrew: גִּלּוּלִ gillul; plural: גִּלּוּלִים gillulim): found 39 times in the Book of Ezekiel and in Leviticus 26:30. Originally means "trunks, logs, blocks," that can be "rolled", it could denote "the primitive stone menhir or construct.
- "Set up their idols in their heart": Rashi interprets this as "Their heart is toward their idols to worship [them]."
- "The stumbling block of their iniquity": from Hebrew: מִכְשֹׁ֣ול עֲוֹנָ֔ם, miḵ-šō-wl ‘ă-wō-nām, is a unique phrase of the prophet Ezekiel (Ezekiel 7:19; 14:3, 4, 7; 18:30; 44:12).

== Noah, Dan'el, and Job (14:12–23) ==
In this section YHWH addresses the question of individual responsibility for sin, which was mentioned in chapter 9 when the righteous people in Jerusalem were 'marked so as to escape the city's destruction' (Ezekiel 9:4; cf. 18:1–30), and whether a few righteous individuals might suffice to save an entire city (cf. Abraham in Genesis 18:22—33) or at least members of their own family (cf. Abraham for Lot in Genesis 19:29). The number of citizens to be spared was apparently quite small, as Ezekiel protests that YHWH is destroying the last remnant of Israel (9:8). YHWH posits that should the three 'legendary paragons of virtue': Noah, Dan'el (Note: Scholars disagree about whether “Dan'el” refers to the biblical Daniel or to the Ugaritic Danel.), and Job, inhabit this land, even 'they would be helpless to save their own children from YHWH's punishment of famine, wild beasts, sword, and plague', which recalls the scenario in chapter 5 and 7 that YHWH is about to bring 'four levitically prescribed punishments against Jerusalem and Israel'. The conclusion of this chapter is clear: Jerusalem ('which is patently not inhabited by Noah, Dan'el, or Job') will not be spared, even 'for the sake of some few righteous citizens, or by the righteousness of those exiles whose children will now share in the city's doom' (verse 21). YHWH adds an ironic note that there will be survivors of the city's destruction who will be brought into exile to show the exiles of 'their obvious wickedness', so people will know that 'YHWH did not destroy the city without reason' (verses 22–23).

=== Verse 14 ===
Though these three men, Noah, Daniel, and Job, were in it,

they should deliver but their own souls by their righteousness,

saith the Lord God.

- "Three men": These three men are selected as they had pled in different "worlds", according to Rashi, that is Noah witnesses the world destroyed and rebuilt, Daniel the temple destroyed and rebuilt, Job the prosperity/"greatness" destroyed and rebuilt. These three Israel's righteous spiritual heroes "could not have prevailed with God in prayer to save the people" from the coming disasters.

=== Verse 20 ===
Though Noah, Daniel, and Job were in it, as I live, saith the Lord God,

they shall deliver neither son nor daughter;

they shall but deliver their own souls by their righteousness.

- "They shall but deliver their own souls by their righteousness": The city of Sodom could be saved with a minimum number of righteous people (Genesis 18:22–23), but the righteous people can only save one's own soul in the case of determined judgment on Jerusalem.

== See also ==
- Daniel
- Daniel in rabbinic literature
- Job
- Noah
- Related Bible parts: Genesis 6, Job 1, Jeremiah 15, Daniel 6, Hebrews 11

== Sources ==
- Bromiley, Geoffrey W. (1995). International Standard Bible Encyclopedia: vol. iv, Q-Z. Eerdmans. ISBN 9780802837844.
- Brown, Francis; Briggs, Charles A.; Driver, S. R. (1994). The Brown-Driver-Briggs Hebrew and English Lexicon (reprint ed.). Hendrickson Publishers. ISBN 978-1565632066.
- Clements, Ronald E (1996). Ezekiel. Westminster John Knox Press. ISBN 9780664252724.
- Coogan, Michael David (2007). Coogan, Michael David; Brettler, Marc Zvi; Newsom, Carol Ann; Perkins, Pheme (eds.). The New Oxford Annotated Bible with the Apocryphal/Deuterocanonical Books: New Revised Standard Version, Issue 48 (Augmented 3rd ed.). Oxford University Press. ISBN 9780195288810.
- Galambush, J. (2007). "25. Ezekiel". In Barton, John; Muddiman, John (eds.). The Oxford Bible Commentary (first (paperback) ed.). Oxford University Press. pp. 533–562. ISBN 978-0199277186.
- Gesenius, H. W. F. (1979). Gesenius' Hebrew and Chaldee Lexicon to the Old Testament Scriptures: Numerically Coded to Strong's Exhaustive Concordance, with an English Index. Translated by Tregelles, Samuel Prideaux (7th ed.). Baker Book House.
- Joyce, Paul M. (2009). Ezekiel: A Commentary. Continuum. ISBN 9780567483614.
- Würthwein, Ernst (1995). The Text of the Old Testament. Translated by Rhodes, Erroll F. Grand Rapids, MI: Wm. B. Eerdmans. ISBN 0-8028-0788-7.
