= André Durand =

Canadian painter (born 1947- died in Terracina 16 november 2024)

André Durand (born 1947 in Ottawa, Ontario - died November 16th, 2024 in Terracina, Lazio) was a Canadian painter working in the European Hermetic tradition. He was influenced by artists such as Rubens, Titian, Michelangelo and Velázquez.

Although Durand was perhaps best known for his allegorical portraits, such as Princess Diana as Fortuna, he achieved international artistic acclaim for his official portraits of John Paul II (1983) and the 14th Dalai Lama (1982, 1983, 1989). Durand's portrait of the Irish novelist Elizabeth Bowen (1972) is one of the most popular portraits in London's National Portrait Gallery. In 1970 Durand painted a series of pictures inspired by the dancers of the Royal Ballet. It was nevertheless Durand's extraordinary mythological narratives that demonstrate his profound understanding of the myths and rituals of both Classical and Christian traditions. These are an ever-present undercurrent of his work.

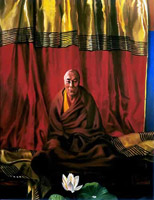
14th Dalai Lama with a white lotus, 1983

From May to October 2006, a major exhibition of paintings, Durand Wholly Pictures, was displayed in Sussex cathedrals and churches. This series of pictures, painted between 2000 and 2006, depicts Christian narratives set against the Sussex countryside. Durand recognized that the need is greater today than ever before for artists to take up devotional subjects in painting. Durand painted his sacred subjects for the benefit of those who are not satisfied by postmodern fashions in this post secular era as much as for churchgoers.

November 1, 2007, marked the 20th anniversary of the unveiling of Durand's Votive Offering, which was painted to launch and benefit the AIDS charity Crusaid in 1987. A unique on-line exhibition about Votive Offering, its sources, and Durand's allegorical pictures of Diana, Princess of Wales, is to be found in Durand Gallery Exhibitions.

On November 29, 2007, a new picture, Daniel in the Lions' Den is to be unveiled. The picture, and the Idea Fine Art limited edition prints of the picture, each signed and numbered by the artist, is to be benefit Demelza Hospice Care for Children.

As Durand has said: 'almost all the young people that inspire me to paint them have something in common. I am convinced that I have met them before in a painting. When I consider the teenage behavior of the deities and saints in mythology or the Bible, not to mention heroes and heroines, the kids in my pictures are appropriate symbols of such protagonists.' How suitable therefore, for Durand to have represented the bravery of Daniel confronting death amongst the lions as a tribute to Demelza's dedication and sensitivity to the uniqueness of the physical, social, intellectual, emotional, cultural and spiritual needs of every child and their family.

In 2011 after his return to Italy and particularly Torre del Greco and Sperlonga we witness a new period in André Durand's artistic trajectory fully manifest, first in the pictures he painted in Museo Archeologico Nazionale di Sperlonga where Durand held an open studio for almost two years as artist in residence and later in Fondi.

At the invitation of doctor Marina Sapelli Ragni, Soprintendente per i Beni Archeologici della Regione Lazio and the director and personnel of the Museo Archeologico Nazionale di Sperlonga from 2010 to 2012 the artist began a body of work, including a series of tondi (round format paintings) on the subject of the Via Lucis. These pictures were finished in the Palazzo Caetani in 2013. The famous Grotto of Tiberius can be seen in the background of five of the six tondos.

One painting Brother Carlo saving the Head of Ulysses was painted for the exhibition Dialogues with the Antique - Dialoghi con l'Antico curated by the archaeologist and author Marina Sapelli Ragni at the Villa Adriana, Tivoli in 2011. Durand's vision of a monk who stoically rescues the severed head of Odysseus.

2012 also saw the publication of several books of Durand's photographs. Notably, Photographing Statues for a Year, photographs the artist took of the statues in the museum from every point of view and in every imaginable lighting conditions. The text was co-written by the museum's director, Marisa de'Spagnolis and published by L'Erma di Bretschneider, and is the only comprehensive archive of photographs of the museum's collection, including two dozen photographs of the celebrated Head of Ulysses that bring the statue (on special loan to the Scuderie del Quirinale, Augustus exhibition October–January 2014) to life.

== 2013: Poesie from the Gods to Jesus Christ - Paintings 2010-2013 ==
For the exhibition at the Caetani Palace in Fondi, Italy, Poesie from the Gods to Jesus Christ, a limited edition catalogue was published under the auspices of the Rotary and Rotaract clubs of Terracina and Fondi. The exhibition also offered a special opportunity to see Durand's official portrait of John Paul II (2004 second version) and the allegory of Giulia Gonzaga that has captivated all Fondi entitled Homage to Titian and Giulia Gonzaga.
