= Ezekiel 6 =

Book of Ezekiel, chapter 6

- ← chapter 5 chapter 7 →
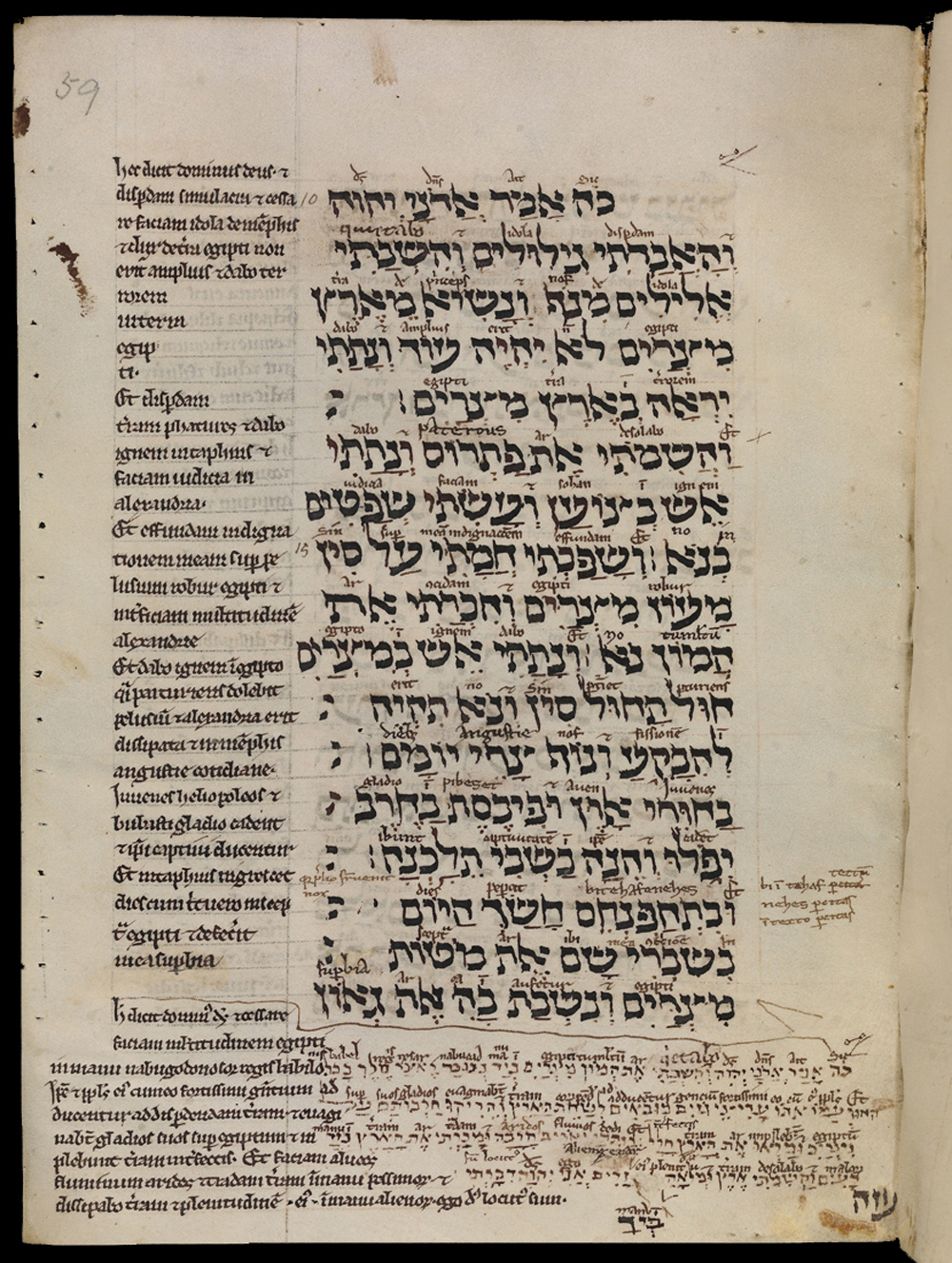
- Book of Ezekiel 30:13–18 in an English manuscript from the early 13th century, MS. Bodl. Or. 62, fol. 59a. A Latin translation appears in the margins with further interlineations above the Hebrew.
- Book: Book of Ezekiel
- Hebrew Bible part: Nevi'im
- Order in the Hebrew part: 7
- Category: Latter Prophets
- Christian Bible part: Old Testament
- Order in the Christian part: 26

Ezekiel 6 is the sixth chapter of the Book of Ezekiel in the Hebrew Bible or the Old Testament of the Christian Bible. This book contains the prophecies attributed to the prophet/priest Ezekiel, and is one of the Books of the Prophets. The high places in the mountains of Israel, "the seats of her idolatry", are the focus of Ezekiel's prophecies in this chapter.

== Text ==
The original text was written in the Hebrew language. This chapter is divided into 14 verses.

=== Textual witnesses ===
Some early manuscripts containing the text of this chapter in Hebrew are of the Masoretic Text tradition, which includes the Codex Cairensis (895), the Petersburg Codex of the Prophets (916), Aleppo Codex (10th century), Codex Leningradensis (1008).

There is also a translation into Koine Greek known as the Septuagint, made in the last few centuries BC. Extant ancient manuscripts of the Septuagint version include Codex Vaticanus (B; $\mathfrak{G}$^{B}; 4th century), Codex Alexandrinus (A; $\mathfrak{G}$^{A}; 5th century) and Codex Marchalianus (Q; $\mathfrak{G}$^{Q}; 6th century). (Note: Ezekiel is missing from Codex Sinaiticus.)

== Summary ==
- Ezekiel 6:1-7: A remnant shall be saved, but the high places, altars and sun-images will be utterly destroyed
- Ezekiel 6:8-10: The prophet is directed to lament their abominations and calamities, but the remnant will escape
- Ezekiel 6:11-14: Emphasizing again the prophecies in chapter 5.

== Verse 4 ==
"Then your altars shall be desolate,

your incense altars shall be broken,

and I will cast down your slain men before your idols." (NKJV)

- "Idols" (Hebrew: גִּלּוּלִ gillul; plural: גִּלּוּלִים gillulim): found 39 times in the Book of Ezekiel and in Leviticus 26:30. The term used is "an opprobrious or contemptuous epithet, applied to idols, though its precise meaning is doubtful".

== See also ==
- Diblah
- Israel
- Son of man
- Related Bible parts: Leviticus 26, Isaiah 5, Ezekiel 5

== Sources ==
- Bromiley, Geoffrey W. (1995). International Standard Bible Encyclopedia: vol. iv, Q-Z. Eerdmans. ISBN 9780802837844.
- Carley, Keith W. (1974). The Book of the Prophet Ezekiel. Cambridge Bible Commentaries on the New English Bible (illustrated ed.). Cambridge University Press. ISBN 9780521097550.
- Clements, Ronald E. (1996). Ezekiel. Westminster John Knox Press. ISBN 9780664252724.
- Coogan, Michael David (2007). Cooganv, Michael David; Brettler, Marc Zvi; Newsom, Carol Ann; Perkins, Pheme (eds.). The New Oxford Annotated Bible with the Apocryphal/Deuterocanonical Books: New Revised Standard Version, Issue 48 (Augmented 3rd ed.). Oxford University Press. ISBN 9780195288810.
- Galambush, J. (2007). "25. Ezekiel". In Barton, John; Muddiman, John (eds.). The Oxford Bible Commentary (first (paperback) ed.). Oxford University Press. pp. 533–562. ISBN 978-0199277186.
- Joyce, Paul M. (2009). Ezekiel: A Commentary. Continuum. ISBN 9780567483614.
- Ulrich, Eugene, ed. (2010). The Biblical Qumran Scrolls: Transcriptions and Textual Variants. Brill.
- Würthwein, Ernst (1995). The Text of the Old Testament. Translated by Rhodes, Erroll F. Grand Rapids, MI: Wm. B. Eerdmans. ISBN 0-8028-0788-7.
