= Ezekiel 8 =

Book of Ezekiel, chapter 8

- ← chapter 7 chapter 9 →
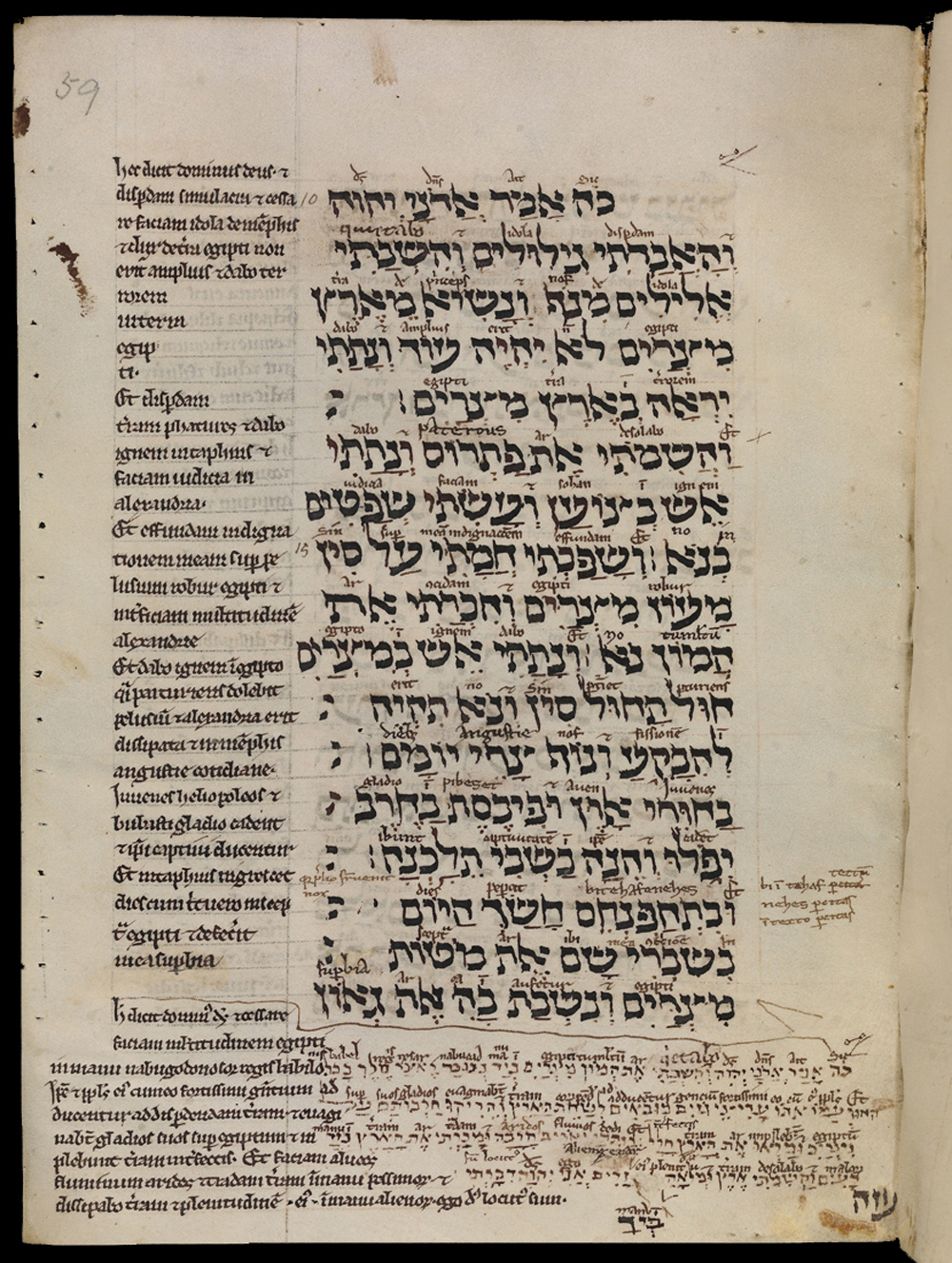
- Book of Ezekiel 30:13–18 in an English manuscript from the early 13th century, MS. Bodl. Or. 62, fol. 59a. A Latin translation appears in the margins with further interlineations above the Hebrew.
- Book: Book of Ezekiel
- Hebrew Bible part: Nevi'im
- Order in the Hebrew part: 7
- Category: Latter Prophets
- Christian Bible part: Old Testament
- Order in the Christian part: 26

Ezekiel 8 is the eighth chapter of the Book of Ezekiel in the Hebrew Bible or the Old Testament of the Christian Bible. This book contains the prophecies attributed to the prophet/priest Ezekiel, and is one of the Books of the Prophets. In this chapter, Ezekiel condemns the idolatry which he sees in the Jerusalem Temple. His vision of the defiled temple continues as far as Ezekiel 11:25.

== Text ==
The original text was written in the Hebrew language. This chapter is divided into 18 verses.

=== Surviving early manuscripts ===
Some early manuscripts containing the text of this chapter in Hebrew are of the Masoretic Text tradition, which includes the Codex Cairensis (895), the Petersburg Codex of the Prophets (916), Aleppo Codex (10th century), Codex Leningradensis (1008).

There is also a translation into Koine Greek known as the Septuagint, made in the last few centuries BC. Extant ancient manuscripts of the Septuagint version include Codex Vaticanus (B; $\mathfrak{G}$^{B}; 4th century), Codex Alexandrinus (A; $\mathfrak{G}$^{A}; 5th century) and Codex Marchalianus (Q; $\mathfrak{G}$^{Q}; 6th century). (Note: Ezekiel is missing from the extant Codex Sinaiticus.)

== Verse 1 ==
And it came to pass in the sixth year, in the sixth month, on the fifth day of the month,

as I sat in my house with the elders of Judah sitting before me,

that the hand of the Lord God fell upon me there.

- "In the sixth year, in the sixth month, on the fifth day of the month": According to the New Oxford Annotated Bible, this day falls on September 17, 592 BCE; this is also the result of calculations by German theologian Bernhard Lang.

Ezekiel is depicted sitting in his own house, with the elders of Judah seated before him. The same format occurs in Ezekiel 14:1 and 20:1; theologian Julie Galambush suggests that "apparently the community recognized Ezekiel's prophetic status and regularly sought YHWH's oracles through him".

== Verse 14 ==
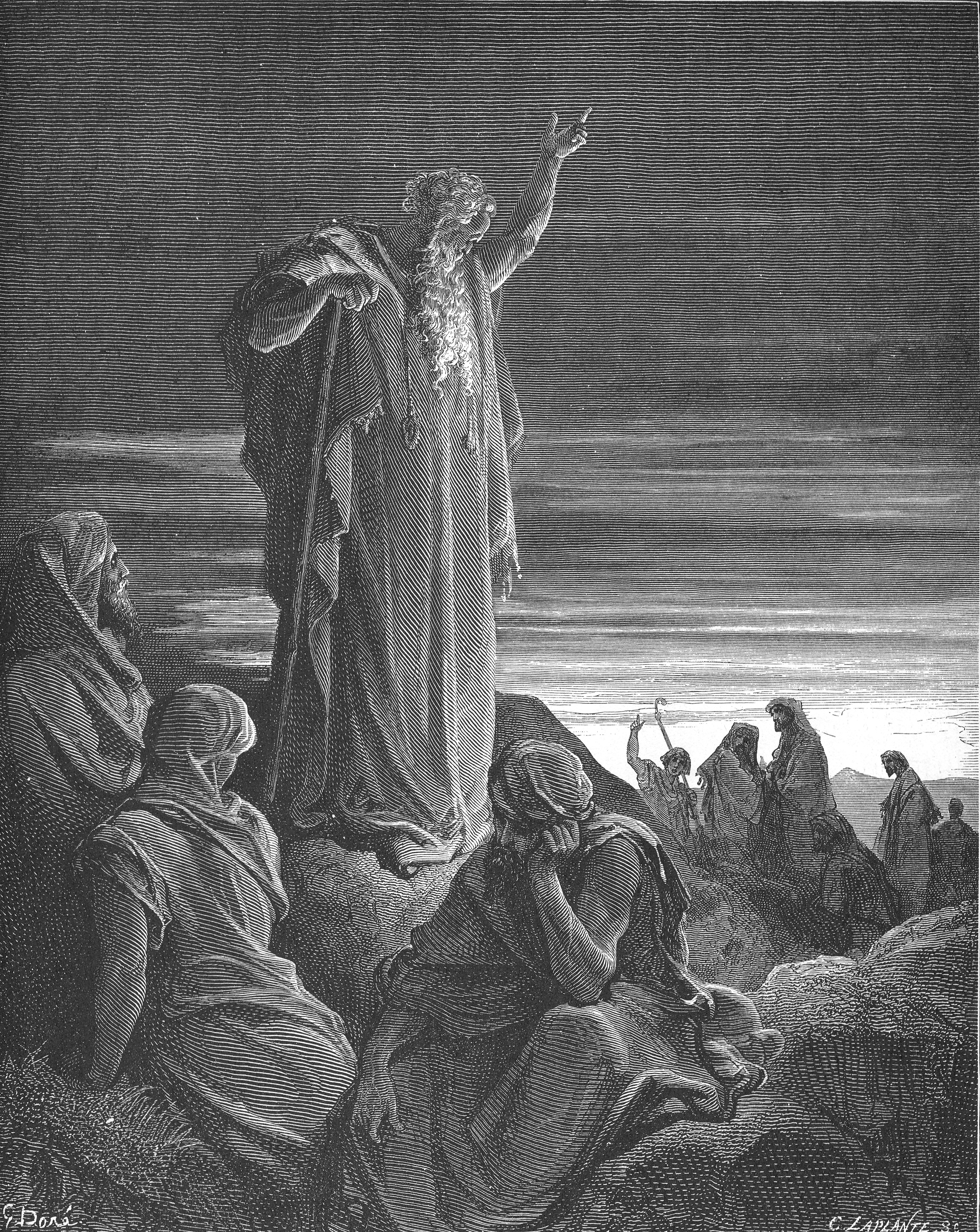
In Ezekiel 8:14, the prophet Ezekiel, shown here in this illustration from 1866 by Gustave Doré, witnesses women mourning the death of Tammuz outside the Second Temple.

So He brought me to the door of the north gate of the Lord’s house;
and to my dismay,

women were sitting there weeping for Tammuz. (NKJV)

"Weeping for Tammuz": an "ancient ritual of Sumerian origin," "counterpart of Sumerian Dumuzi, the fertility-god associated with shepherding and vegetation". The weeping is to commemorate the death of seasonal fertility, and the cult stresses for the mourning aspect of it. The Phoenicians called it "Adon" (or "Lord"), from where the Greek cult "Adonis" took root. The cult of Ishtar and Tammuz may have been introduced to the Kingdom of Judah during the reign of King Manasseh and the Old Testament contains numerous allusions to them. Ezekiel's testimony is the only direct mention of Tammuz in the Hebrew Bible, but the cult of Tammuz may also be alluded to in Isaiah 17:10–11:

"Because thou hast forgotten the God of thy salvation, and hast not been mindful of the rock of thy strength, therefore shalt thou plant pleasant plants, and shalt set it with strange slips: In the day shalt thou make thy plant to grow, and in the morning shalt thou make thy seed to flourish: but the harvest shall be a heap in the day of grief and of desperate sorrow."

This passage may be describing the miniature gardens that women would plant in honor of Tammuz during his festival. Isaiah 1:29–30, Isaiah 65:3, and Isaiah 66:17 all denounce sacrifices made "in the gardens", which may also be connected to the cult of Tammuz. Another possible allusion to Tammuz occurs in Daniel 11:37: "Neither shall he regard the God of his fathers, nor the desire of women, nor regard any god: for he shall magnify himself above all." The subject of this passage is Antiochus IV Epiphanes and some scholars have interpreted the reference to the "one desired by women" in this passage as an indication that Antiochus may have persecuted the cult of Tammuz. There is no external evidence to support this reading, however, and it is much more probable that this epithet is merely a jibe at Antiochus's notorious cruelty towards all the women who fell in love with him.

== Verse 16 ==
So He brought me into the inner court of the Lord’s house; and there, at the door of the temple of the Lord, between the porch and the altar, were about twenty-five men with their backs toward the temple of the Lord and their faces toward the east, and they were worshiping the sun toward the east. (NKJV)

- "Worshipping the sun": This practice in Israel is mentioned in 2 Kings 23:5,11 and also "evidenced by artifacts".

== See also ==
- Jaazaniah the son of Shaphan
- Son of man
- Tammuz
- Related Bible parts: Joel 2, Luke 11, 2 Corinthians 12

== Sources ==
- Breitenberger, Barbara (2007), Aphrodite and Eros: The Development of Greek Erotic Mythology, New York City, New York and London, England, ISBN 978-0-415-96823-2
- Bromiley, Geoffrey W. (1995). International Standard Bible Encyclopedia: vol. iv, Q-Z. Eerdmans. ISBN 9780802837844.
- Clements, Ronald E (1996). Ezekiel. Westminster John Knox Press. ISBN 9780664252724.
- Joyce, Paul M. (2009). Ezekiel: A Commentary. Continuum. ISBN 9780567483614.
- Kee, Howard Clark; Meyers, Eric M.; Rogerson, John; Levine, Amy-Jill; Saldarini, Anthony J. (2008). Chilton, Bruce (ed.). The Cambridge Companion to the Bible (2, revised ed.). Cambridge University Press. ISBN 9780521691406.
- Middlemas, Jill (2005), The Troubles of Templeless Judah, Oxford, England: Oxford University Press, ISBN 978-0199283866
- Pryke, Louise M. (2017), Ishtar, New York and London: Routledge, ISBN 978-1-138--86073-5
- Smith, Mark S. (2002), The Early History of God: Yahweh and the Other Deities in Ancient Israel (2nd ed.), Wm. B. Eerdmans Publishing Company, ISBN 9780802839725
- van der Toorn, Karel; Becking, Bob; Willem, Pieter (1999), Dictionary of Deities and Demons in the Bible (second ed.), Grand Rapids, Michigan: William B. Eerdman's Publishing Company, ISBN 978-0-8028-2491-2
- Warner, Marina (2016) [1976], Alone of All Her Sex: The Myth and Cult of the Virgin Mary, Oxford, England: Oxford University Press, ISBN 978-0-19-963994-6
- Würthwein, Ernst (1995). The Text of the Old Testament. Translated by Rhodes, Erroll F. Grand Rapids, MI: Wm. B. Eerdmans. ISBN 0-8028-0788-7.
