= Ezekiel 7 =

Book of Ezekiel, chapter 7

- ← chapter 6 chapter 8 →
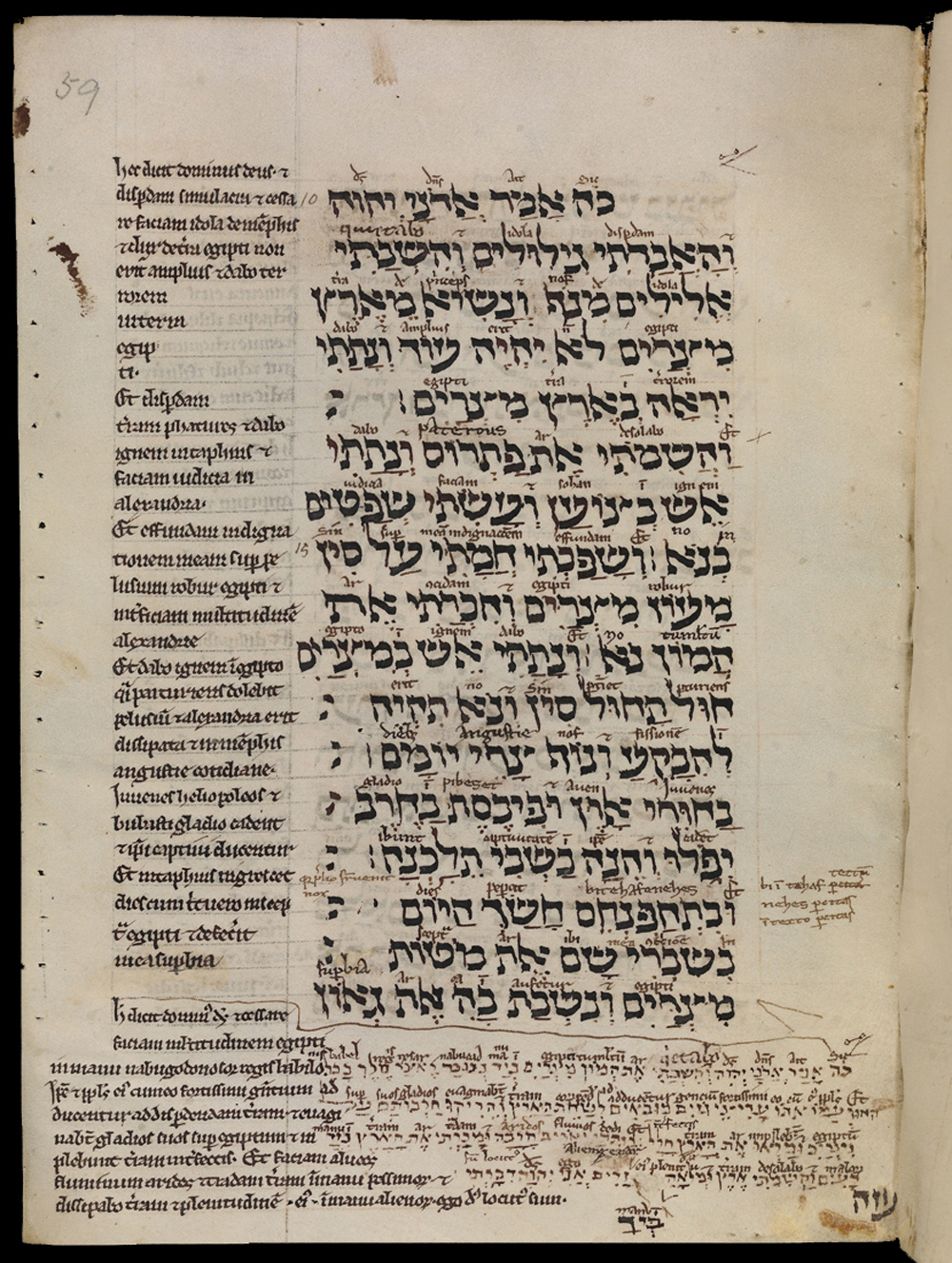
- Book of Ezekiel 30:13–18 in an English manuscript from the early 13th century, MS. Bodl. Or. 62, fol. 59a. A Latin translation appears in the margins with further interlineations above the Hebrew.
- Book: Book of Ezekiel
- Hebrew Bible part: Nevi'im
- Order in the Hebrew part: 7
- Category: Latter Prophets
- Christian Bible part: Old Testament
- Order in the Christian part: 26

Ezekiel 7 is the seventh chapter of the Book of Ezekiel in the Hebrew Bible or the Old Testament of the Christian Bible. This book contains the prophecies attributed to the prophet/priest Ezekiel, and is one of the Books of the Prophets. In this chapter, Ezekiel announces that "judgment on Israel is near".

== Text ==
The original text was written in the Hebrew language. This chapter is divided into 27 verses.

=== Textual witnesses ===
Some early manuscripts containing the text of this chapter in Hebrew are of the Masoretic Text tradition, which includes the Codex Cairensis (895), the Petersburg Codex of the Prophets (916), Aleppo Codex (10th century), and Codex Leningradensis (1008). Fragments containing parts of this chapter were found among the Dead Sea Scrolls, that is, 11Q4 (11QEzek; 50 BCE–50 CE) with extant verses 9–12.

There is also a translation into Koine Greek known as the Septuagint, made in the last few centuries BCE. Extant ancient manuscripts of the Septuagint version include Codex Vaticanus (B; $\mathfrak{G}$^{B}; 4th century), Codex Alexandrinus (A; $\mathfrak{G}$^{A}; 5th century) and Codex Marchalianus (Q; $\mathfrak{G}$^{Q}; 6th century). (Note: Ezekiel is missing from Codex Sinaiticus.)

== Structure ==
American biblical commentator Julie Galambush divides this chapter into three sections, verses 1–4, 5-9 and 10–27, "which seem to build on [the prophet] Amos's announcement of the day of YHWH (Amos 8:1-10), a day traditionally celebrating the Divine Warrior's conquest of his enemies, but which the prophets re-envisioned as a day of judgement against Israel". Each section announces Israel's doom and concludes with the recognition formula: "and ye (they) shall know that I am the LORD", in the latter parts of verses 4, 9 and 27.

== Verse 2 ==
Also, thou son of man, thus saith the Lord God unto the land of Israel;

An end, the end is come upon the four corners of the land.

The phrase "Son of man" (Hebrew: בן־אדם ḇen-’ā-ḏām) is used 93 times to address Ezekiel. The "land of Israel" refers to the Kingdom of Judah, as the ten tribes of northern Israel had already been carried captive. Theologian John Gill dates this prophecy to the sixth year of King Zedekiah (around 591 BC).

Hebrew Bible scholar Dr. Kyle Greenwood believes the term "four corners" to be an idiom for the four cardinal directions as seen in the four points of a compass. He mentions this expression is also found in Isaiah 11:12, Revelation 7:1 and Revelation 20:8.

== Verse 19 ==
They shall cast their silver in the streets, and their gold shall be removed: their silver and their gold shall not be able to deliver them in the day of the wrath of the Lord: they shall not satisfy their souls, neither fill their bowels: because it is the stumblingblock of their iniquity.

Verses 19-23 predict in veiled language the Babylonian capture and desecration of the Jerusalem temple.

- "The stumbling block of their iniquity": from Hebrew: מִכְשֹׁ֥ול עֲוֹנָ֖ם, miḵ-šō-wl ‘ă-wō-nām, is a phrase unique to the prophet Ezekiel (Ezekiel 14:3, 4, 7; 18:30; 44:12).

== Verse 25 ==
Destruction comes; they will seek peace, but there shall be none.

Destruction: literally "shuddering", also translated as "anguish".

== Verse 27 ==
The king will mourn,

The prince will be clothed with desolation,

And the hands of the common people will tremble.

I will do to them according to their way,

And according to what they deserve I will judge them;

Then they shall know that I am the Lord!

The king and the prince are the same person: Zedekiah. The reference to the king is missing in the Septuagint and, according to the Jerusalem Bible, this may be a later addition, as reference to the king is exceptional in Ezekiel.

- "I will do unto them after their way" (KJV): thus, Israel is "treated precisely as she deserves."
- "And they shall know that I am the Lord" (KJV): this becomes a recurring theme for Ezekiel, revealing that "the prophet identifies his words as a manifestation of the active presence of God."

== Uses ==
=== Music ===
"Ezekiel 7 and the Permanent Efficacy of Grace" is a song title in the album "The Life of the World to Come" inspired by this chapter that was released by the American band The Mountain Goats in 2009.

== See also ==
- Son of man
- Related Bible parts: Amos 5, Amos 8, 1 Thessalonians 5, 1 Peter 4

== Sources ==
- Bromiley, Geoffrey W. (1995). International Standard Bible Encyclopedia: vol. iv, Q-Z. Eerdmans. ISBN 9780802837844.
- Clements, Ronald E. (1996). Ezekiel. Westminster John Knox Press. ISBN 9780664252724.
- Galambush, J. (2007). "25. Ezekiel". In Barton, John; Muddiman, John (eds.). The Oxford Bible Commentary (first (paperback) ed.). Oxford University Press. pp. 533–562. ISBN 978-0199277186.
- Joyce, Paul M. (2009). Ezekiel: A Commentary. Continuum. ISBN 9780567483614.
- Ulrich, Eugene, ed. (2010). The Biblical Qumran Scrolls: Transcriptions and Textual Variants. Brill.
- Würthwein, Ernst (1995). The Text of the Old Testament. Translated by Rhodes, Erroll F. Grand Rapids, MI: Wm. B. Eerdmans. ISBN 0-8028-0788-7.
