= Ezekiel 15 =

Book of Ezekiel, chapter 15

- ← chapter 14 chapter 16 →
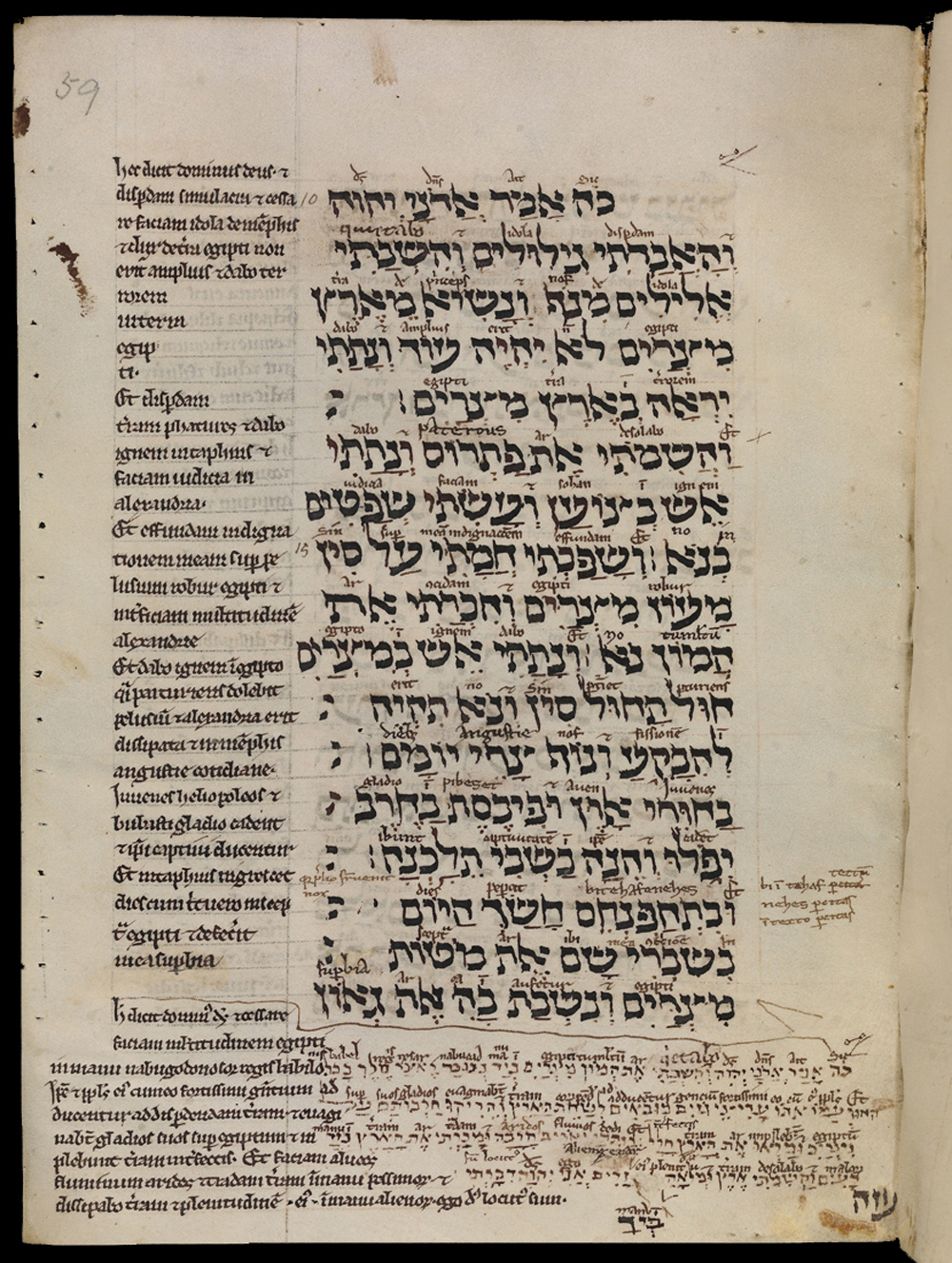
- Book of Ezekiel 30:13–18 in an English manuscript from the early 13th century, MS. Bodl. Or. 62, fol. 59a. A Latin translation appears in the margins with further interlineations above the Hebrew.
- Book: Book of Ezekiel
- Hebrew Bible part: Nevi'im
- Order in the Hebrew part: 7
- Category: Latter Prophets
- Christian Bible part: Old Testament
- Order in the Christian part: 26

Ezekiel 15 is the fifteenth chapter of the Book of Ezekiel in the Hebrew Bible or the Old Testament of the Christian Bible. This book contains the prophecies attributed to the prophet/priest Ezekiel, and is one of the Books of the Prophets. This chapter records a parable about the fate of the "useless" grapevine as a symbol of the nation of Israel at that time. In the New King James Version, this chapter is sub-titled "The Outcast Vine"; according to commentator Andrew Davidson, it records "the uselessness of the wood of the vine".

== Text ==
The original text was written in the Hebrew language. This chapter, the shortest in Ezekiel, is divided into 8 verses.

=== Textual witnesses ===
Some early manuscripts containing the text of this chapter in Hebrew are of the Masoretic Text tradition, which includes the Codex Cairensis (895), the Petersburg Codex of the Prophets (916), Aleppo Codex (10th century), Codex Leningradensis (1008).

There is also a translation into Koine Greek known as the Septuagint, made in the last few centuries BC. Extant ancient manuscripts of the Septuagint version include Codex Vaticanus (B; $\mathfrak{G}$^{B}; 4th century), Codex Alexandrinus (A; $\mathfrak{G}$^{A}; 5th century) and Codex Marchalianus (Q; $\mathfrak{G}$^{Q}; 6th century). (Note: Ezekiel is missing from the extant Codex Sinaiticus.)

== Verse 2 ==
Son of man, what is the vine tree more than any tree,

or than a branch which is among the trees of the forest?

- "Son of man" (Hebrew: בן־אדם ḇen-’ā-ḏām): this phrase is used 93 times to address Ezekiel.

== Verse 6 ==
Therefore thus saith the Lord God;
As the vine tree among the trees of the forest,

which I have given to the fire for fuel,

so will I give the inhabitants of Jerusalem.

Application of the figure to Jerusalem.

- "Fuel" (Hebrew: אָכְלָה ’āḵ-lāh; 'ok-lah): the Hebrew word actually means "food" as in "food of wild beast", but also used as "food of fire", that is "to be consumed by fire." The wood of the vine is worthy only when it produces grapes, otherwise it is useless, so it is thrown to the fire (John 15:6).

== See also ==
- Jerusalem
- Vine
- Related Bible parts: Psalm 80, Isaiah 5, John 15

== Sources ==
- Bromiley, Geoffrey W. (1995). International Standard Bible Encyclopedia: vol. iv, Q-Z. Eerdmans. ISBN 9780802837844.
- Brown, Francis; Briggs, Charles A.; Driver, S. R. (1994). The Brown-Driver-Briggs Hebrew and English Lexicon (reprint ed.). Hendrickson Publishers. ISBN 978-1565632066.
- Clements, Ronald E (1996). Ezekiel. Westminster John Knox Press. ISBN 9780664252724.
- Gesenius, H. W. F. (1979). Gesenius' Hebrew and Chaldee Lexicon to the Old Testament Scriptures: Numerically Coded to Strong's Exhaustive Concordance, with an English Index. Translated by Tregelles, Samuel Prideaux (7th ed.). Baker Book House.
- Joyce, Paul M. (2009). Ezekiel: A Commentary. Continuum. ISBN 9780567483614.
- Würthwein, Ernst (1995). The Text of the Old Testament. Translated by Rhodes, Erroll F. Grand Rapids, MI: Wm. B. Eerdmans. ISBN 0-8028-0788-7.
