= Stations of the Resurrection =

Form of Christian devotion

The Stations of the Resurrection, also known by the Latin name Via Lucis (Way of Light), are a form of Christian devotion, encouraging meditation upon the Resurrection of Jesus Christ and some of the Resurrection appearances and other episodes recorded in the New Testament. The term may also be used as a name for a series of pictures or sculptures representing the various episodes, although these are nowhere near as common as those for the Stations of the Cross, depicting the stages of the Passion of Jesus. The concept was devised in 1988.

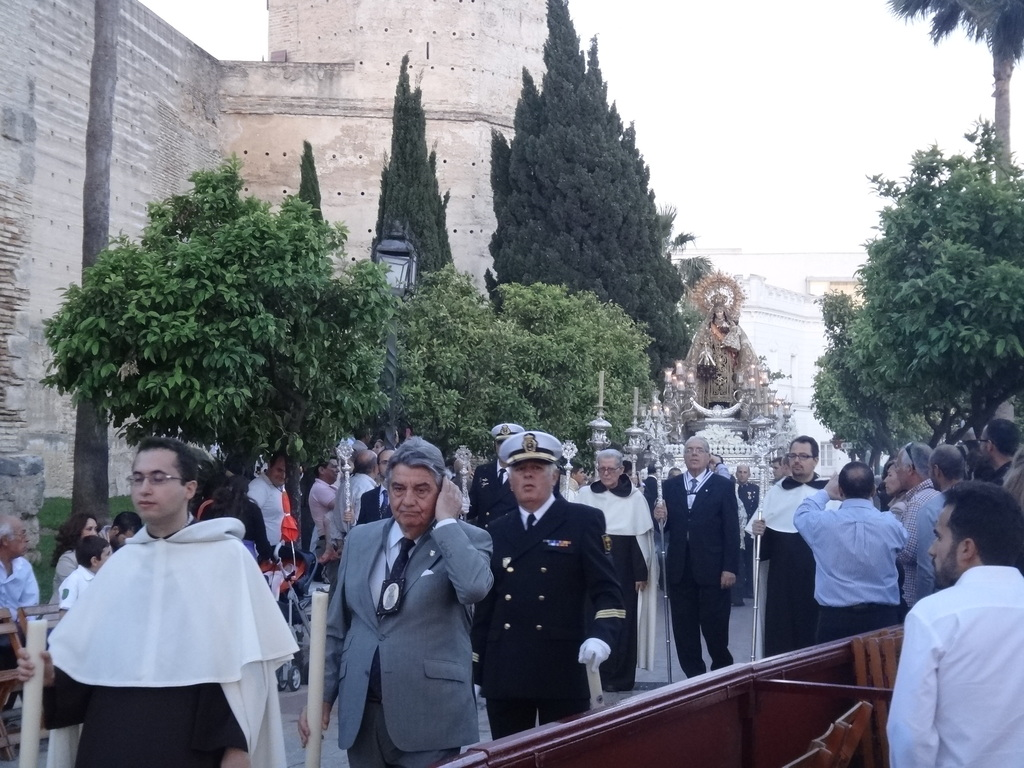
Via Lucis

The Stations of the Resurrection complement the Stations of the Cross or Via Crucis (the term Via Lucis is intentionally reminiscent of this), a traditional Catholic devotion commemorating the Passion of Jesus. Unlike the traditional form of the Stations of the Cross—though in common with the revised form of that devotion introduced by Pope John Paul II on Good Friday 1991—all the Stations of the Resurrection are based on scripturally-recorded incidents contained in the four Gospels and the Acts of the Apostles.

As with the Stations of the Cross, the devotion takes no fixed form, but typically includes for each Station a reading from Scripture, a short meditation, contemplation, and a prayer. Where a series of pictures is used to aid the devotion, it takes the form of a procession, with movement from one Station to the next sometimes being accompanied by the singing of one or more verses of a hymn.

== History ==
In the traditional scheme of the Stations of the Cross, the final Station is the burial of Jesus. Though this constitutes a logical conclusion to the Via Crucis, it has been increasingly regarded as unsatisfactory as an end-point to meditation upon the Paschal mystery, which according to Christian doctrine culminates in, and is incomplete without, the Resurrection (see, for example, 1 Corinthians 15.17–20). For this reason a fifteenth Station, representing the Resurrection, is sometimes added to the Stations of the Cross. Even this practice has, however, been subject to criticism as insufficiently representing the two-fold dynamic of the Paschal mystery: the suffering and death of Jesus on the one hand, and on the other his Resurrection and glorification.

In the summer of 1988, Father Sabino Palumbieri, Professor of Anthropology at the Salesian University in Rome, proposed the creation of a new set of stations, centred upon the Resurrection and the events following from it, so as to emphasise the positive, hopeful aspect of the Christian story which, though not absent from the Stations of the Cross, is obscured by their emphasis upon suffering. The first major public celebration of this devotion was in 1990, after which it gained greater currency.

In December 2001, the Holy See promulgated a Directory on Popular Piety and the Liturgy, which commended the Via Lucis as follows:

A pious exercise called the Via Lucis has developed and spread to many regions in recent years. Following the model of the Via Crucis, the faithful process while meditating on the various appearances of Jesus – from his Resurrection to his Ascension – in which he showed his glory to the disciples who awaited the coming of the Holy Spirit (cf. John 14, 26; 16, 13-15; Lk 24, 49), strengthened their faith, brought to completion his teaching on the Kingdom and more closely defined the sacramental and hierarchical structure of the Church.

Through the Via Lucis, the faithful recall the central event of the faith – the resurrection of Christ – and their discipleship in virtue of Baptism, the paschal sacrament by which they have passed from the darkness of sin to the bright radiance of the light of grace (cf. Col 1, 13; Eph 5, 8).

For centuries the Via Crucis involved the faithful in the first moment of the Easter event, namely the Passion, and helped to fix its most important aspects in their consciousness. Analogously, the Via Lucis, when celebrated in fidelity to the Gospel text, can effectively convey a living understanding to the faithful of the second moment of the Paschal event, namely the Lord's Resurrection.

The Via Lucis is potentially an excellent pedagogy of the faith, since "per crucem ad lucem" [through the Cross (one comes) to the light]. Using the metaphor of a journey, the Via Lucis moves from the experience of suffering, which in God's plan is part of life, to the hope of arriving at man's true end: liberation, joy and peace which are essentially paschal values.

The Via Lucis is a potential stimulus for the restoration of a "culture of life" which is open to the hope and certitude offered by faith, in a society often characterized by a "culture of death", despair and nihilism.

== List of Stations ==
As of 2007 there is no universally-agreed list of Stations of the Resurrection, nor have any Church authorities sought to impose a definitive list, and as a result some churches have commissioned sets of sculptures for the Stations according to their own distinctive scheme which may not be followed elsewhere. (This is similar to the history of the Stations of the Cross, which attained their normative form only after many centuries of widely varying local practice.) As to the number of Stations, however, there is general agreement that in order to emphasise the complementarity between the Stations of the Cross and the Stations of the Resurrection there should be fourteen Stations of the Resurrection, as is traditionally the case with the Stations of the Cross.

In spite of continuing local variability, there appears nevertheless to be an increasing convergence upon the following as a recognised list of Stations of the Resurrection:

1. Jesus is raised from the dead
2. The finding of the empty tomb
3. Mary Magdalene meets the risen Jesus
4. Jesus appears on the road to Emmaus
5. Jesus is known in the breaking of bread
6. Jesus appears to the disciples in Jerusalem
7. Jesus gives the disciples his peace and the power to forgive sins
8. Jesus strengthens the faith of Thomas
9. Jesus appears by the Sea of Tiberias
10. Jesus forgives Peter and commands him to feed his sheep
11. Jesus commissions the disciples upon the mountain
12. The Ascension of Jesus
13. Mary and the disciples wait in prayer
14. The Holy Spirit descends at Pentecost

Other sources, however, including some recent ones, replace some of these Stations with others, such as:

- The earthquake
- The angel appears to the women
- Jesus meets the women
- Jesus meets his mother
- Mary Magdalene proclaims the Resurrection to the disciples
- Jesus and the beloved disciple
- Jesus appears to over five hundred at once
- Jesus appears to Saul

=== The stations in Dunaszentmiklós ===
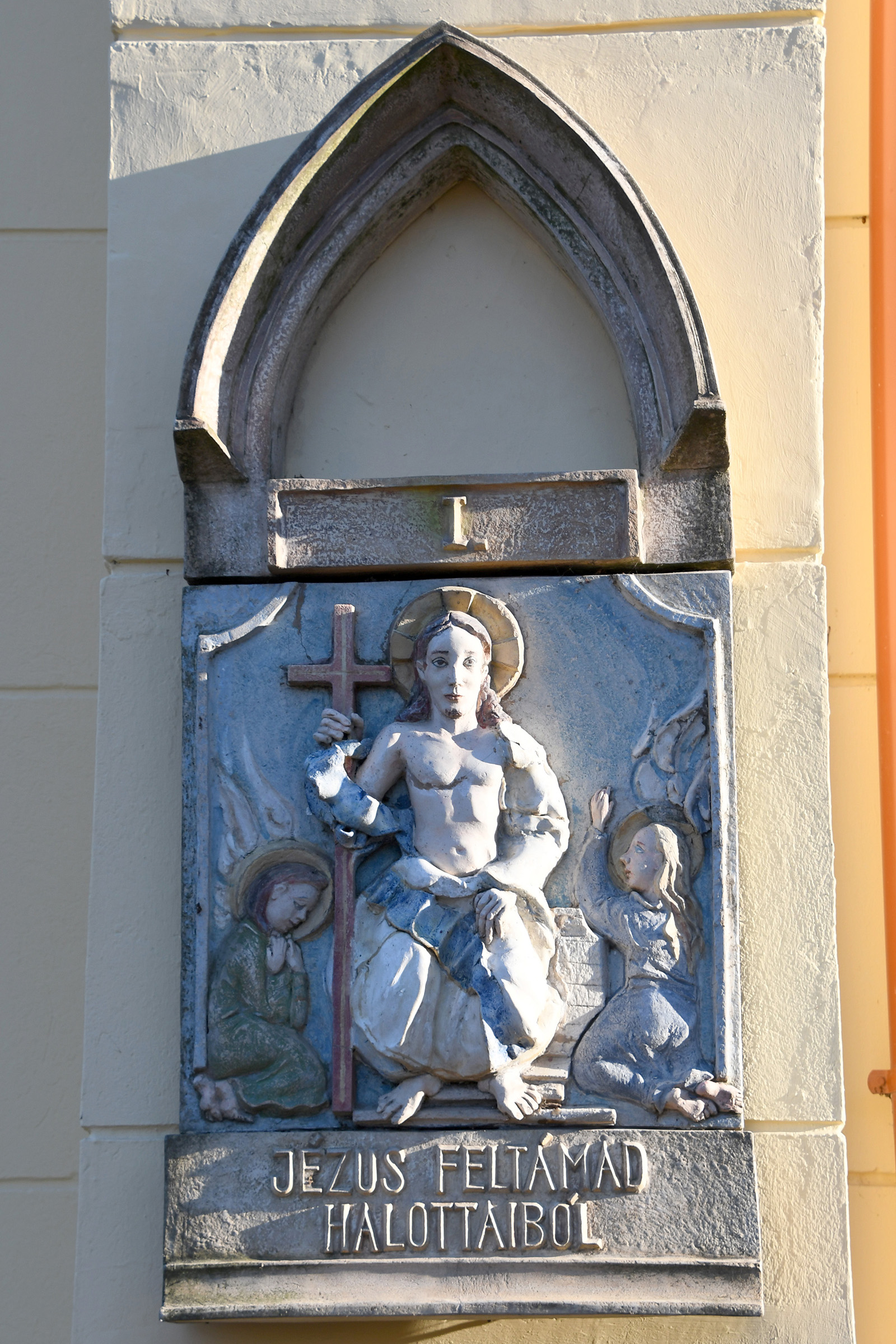
Jesus raised from the dead

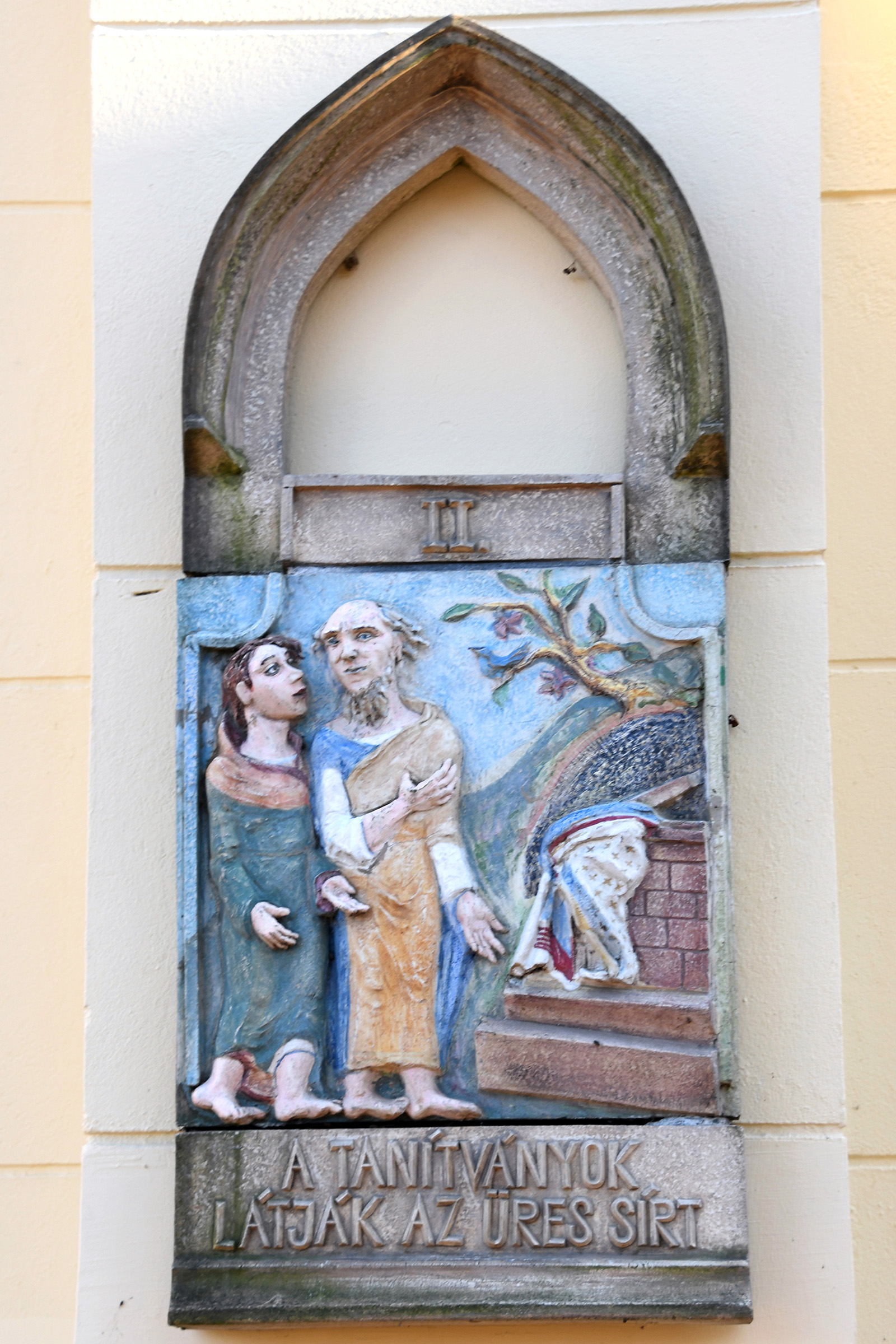
The empty tomb

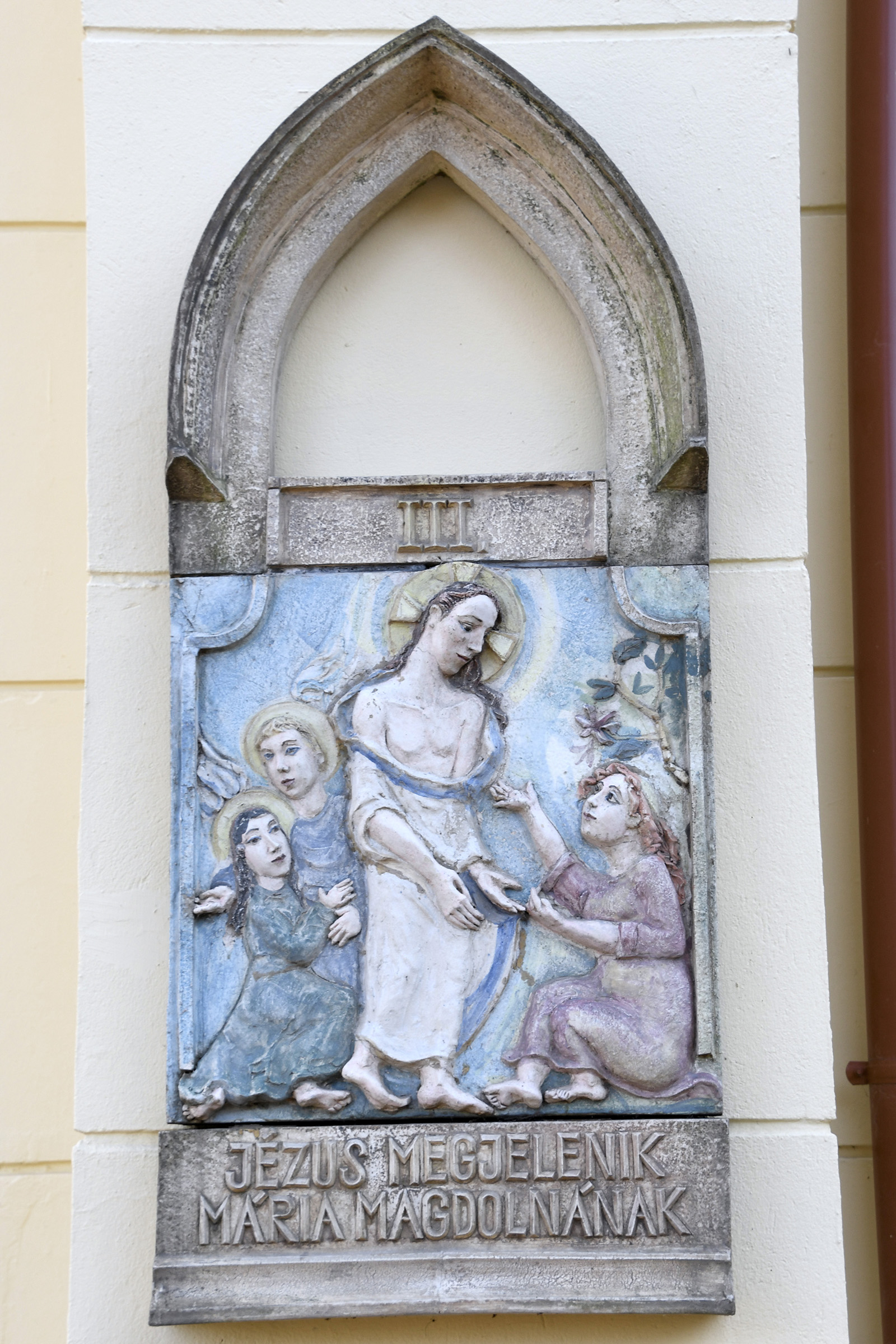
Mary Magdalene meets the risen Christ

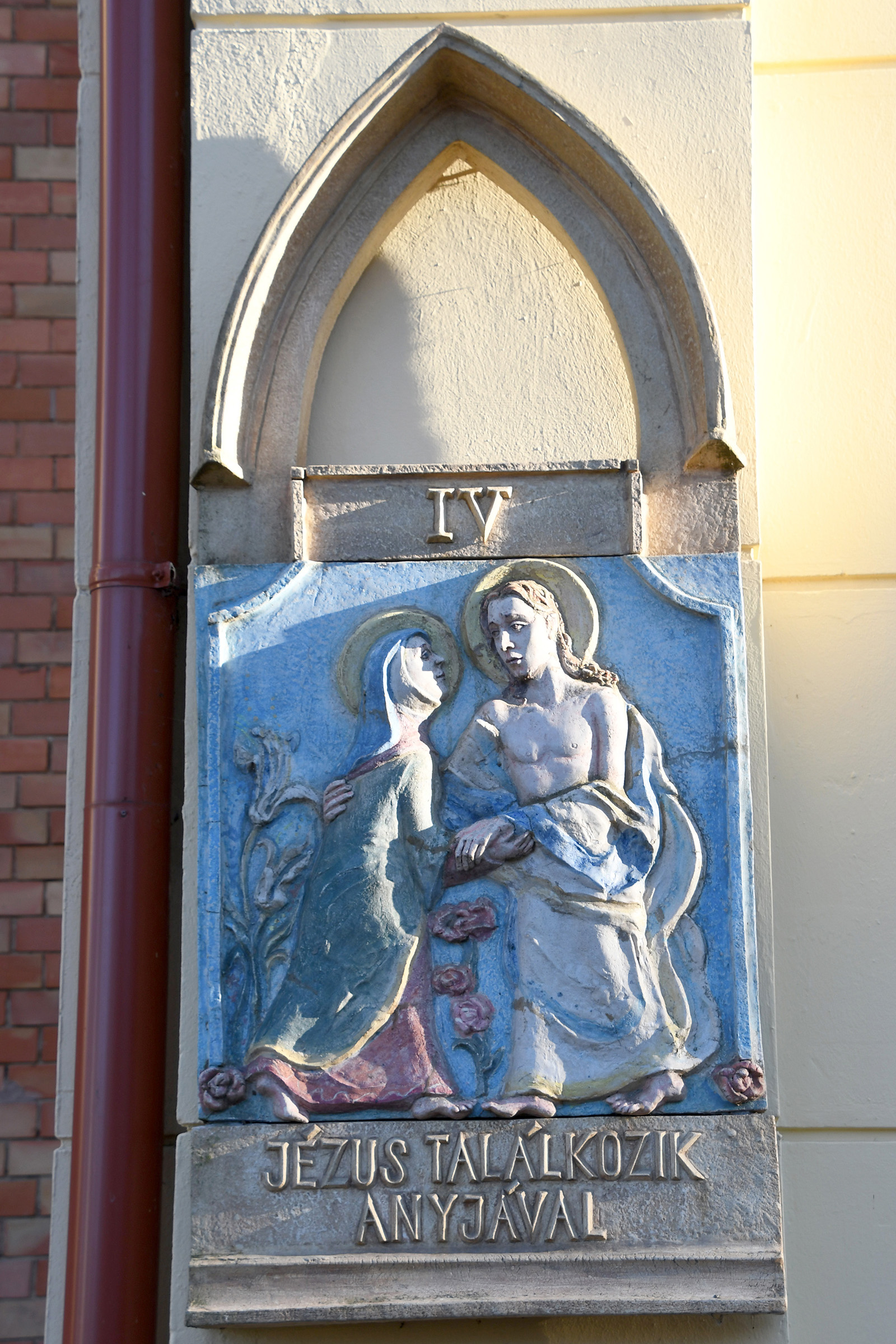
Jesus meets his mother

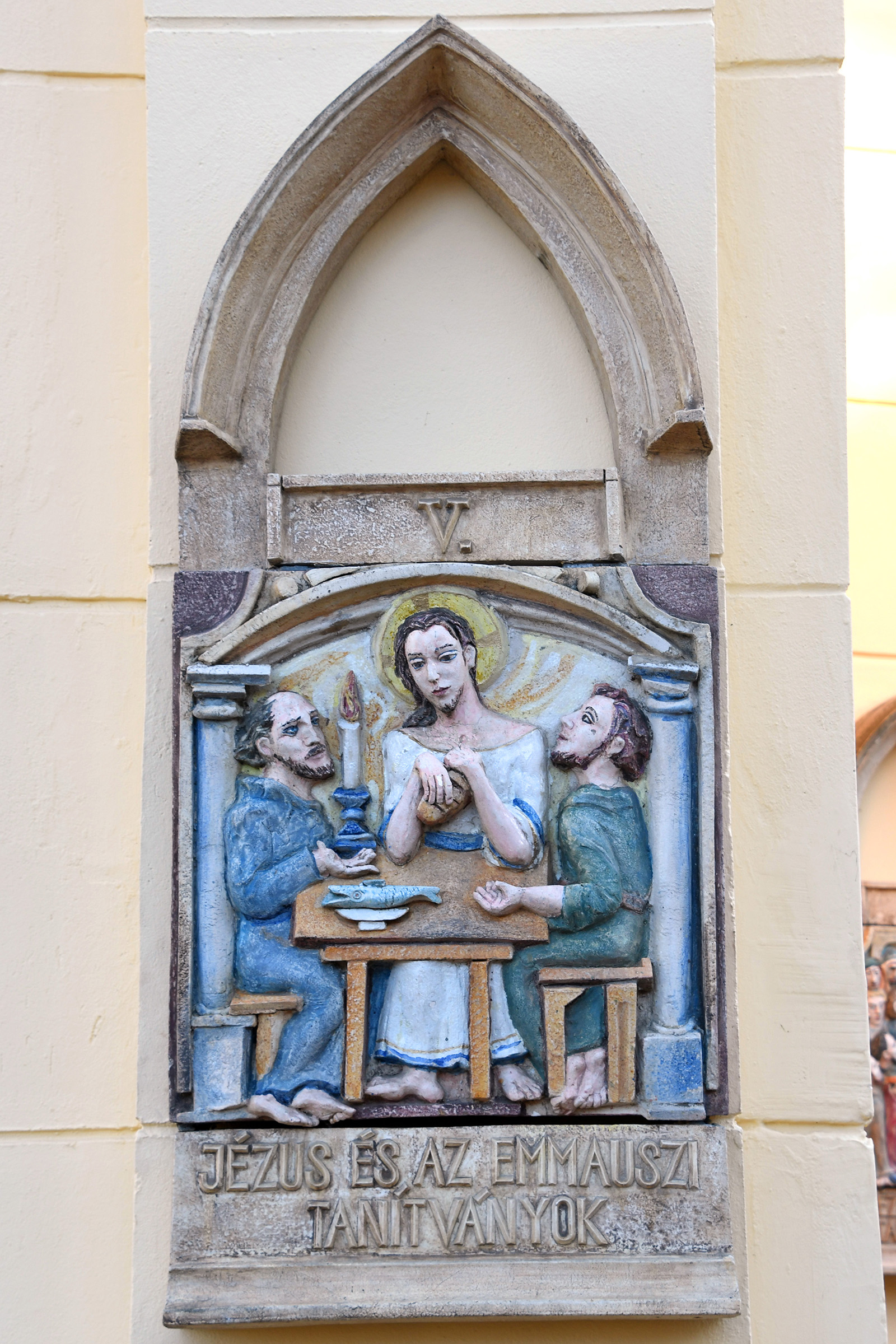
The breaking of bread on the road to Emmaus

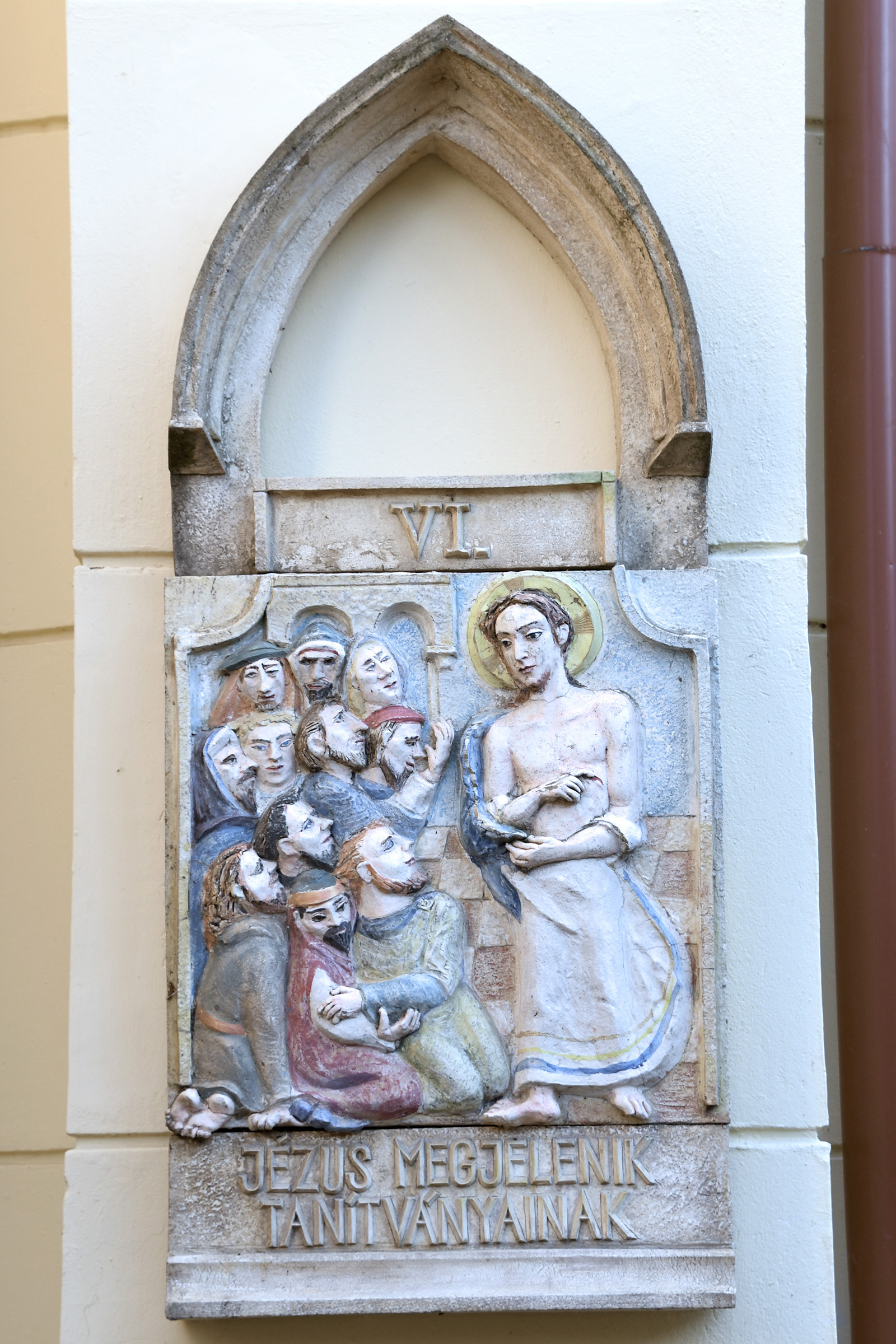
Jesus appears to the disciples

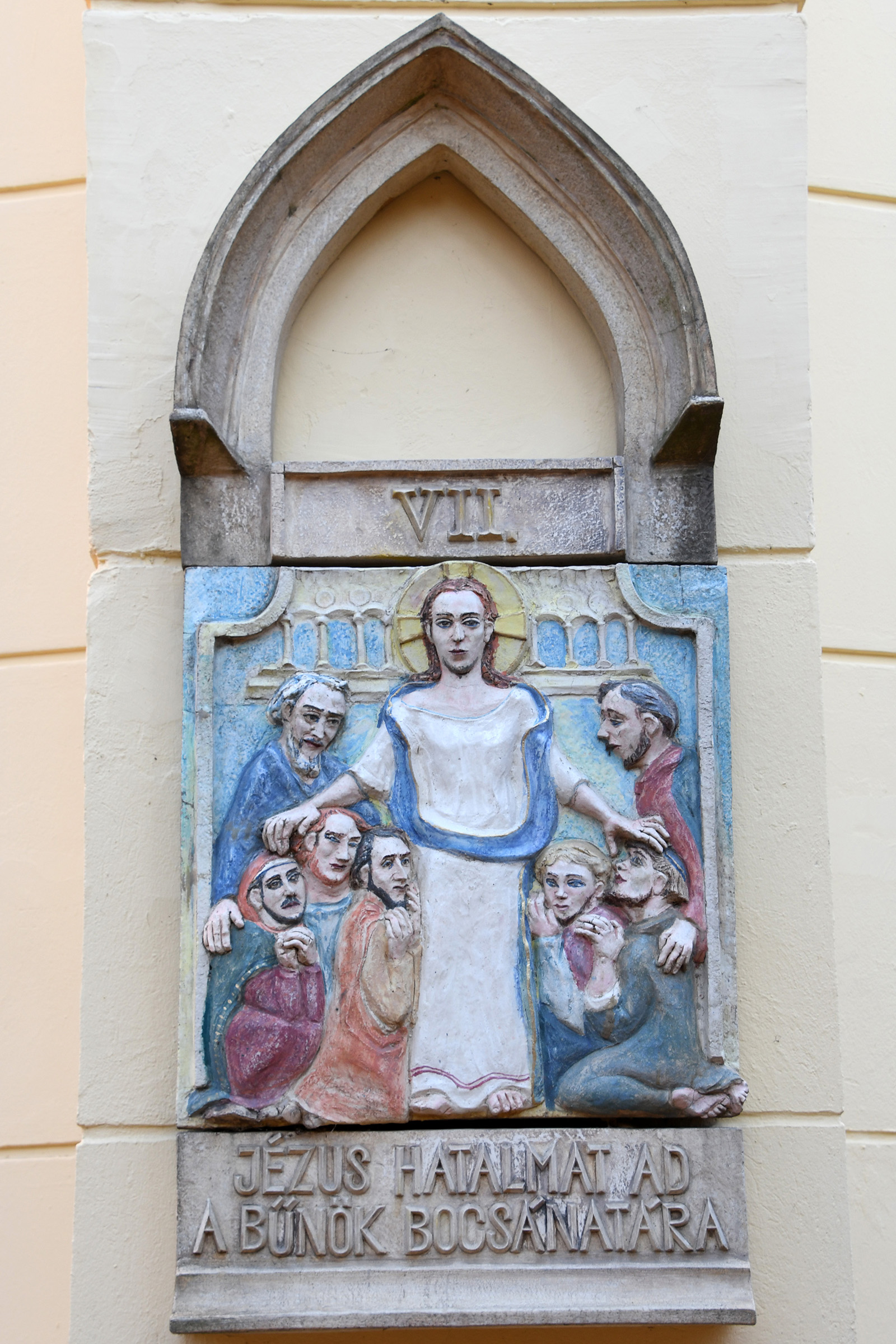
Jesus gives the disciples power to forgive sins

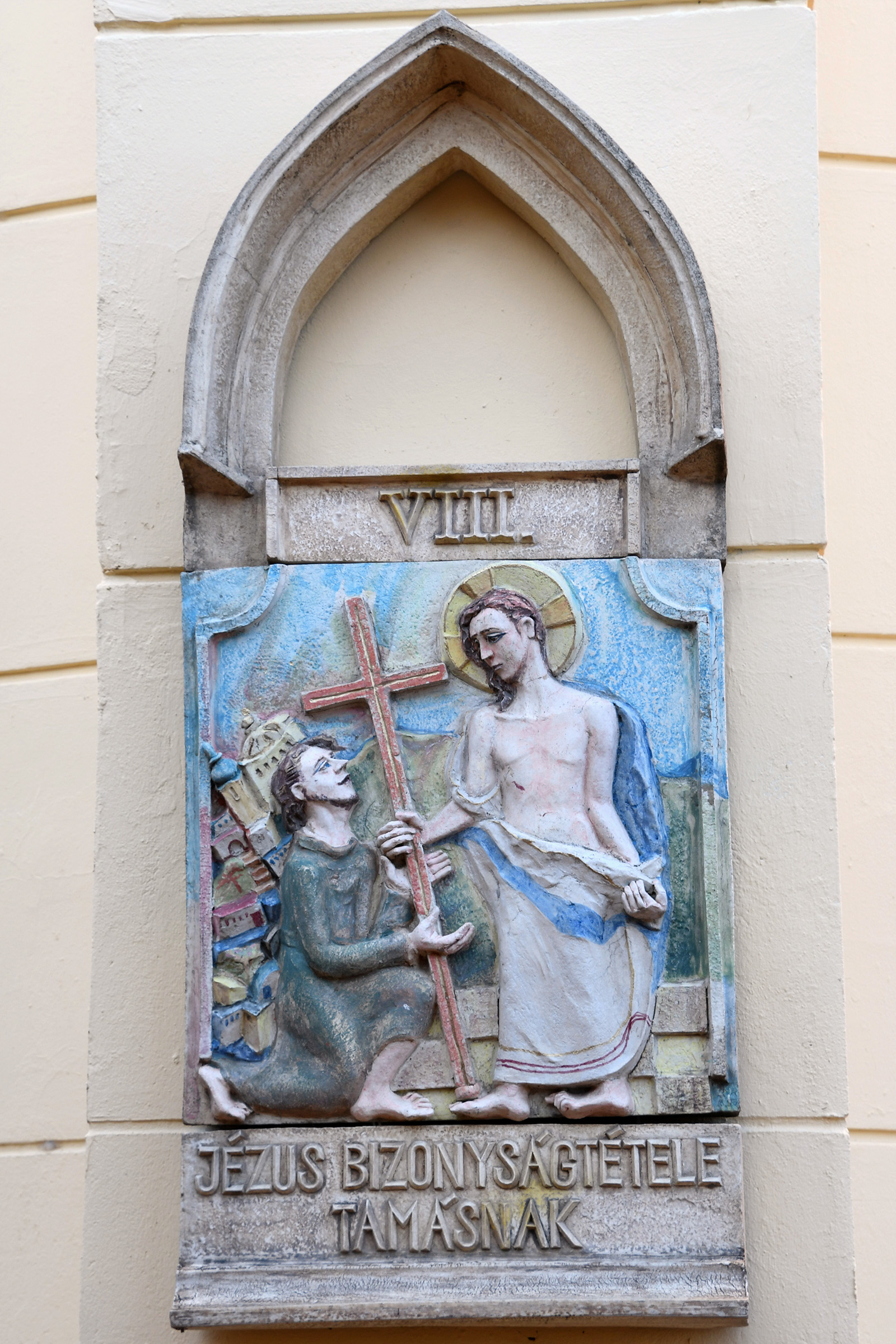
Jesus shows proof to Doubting Thomas

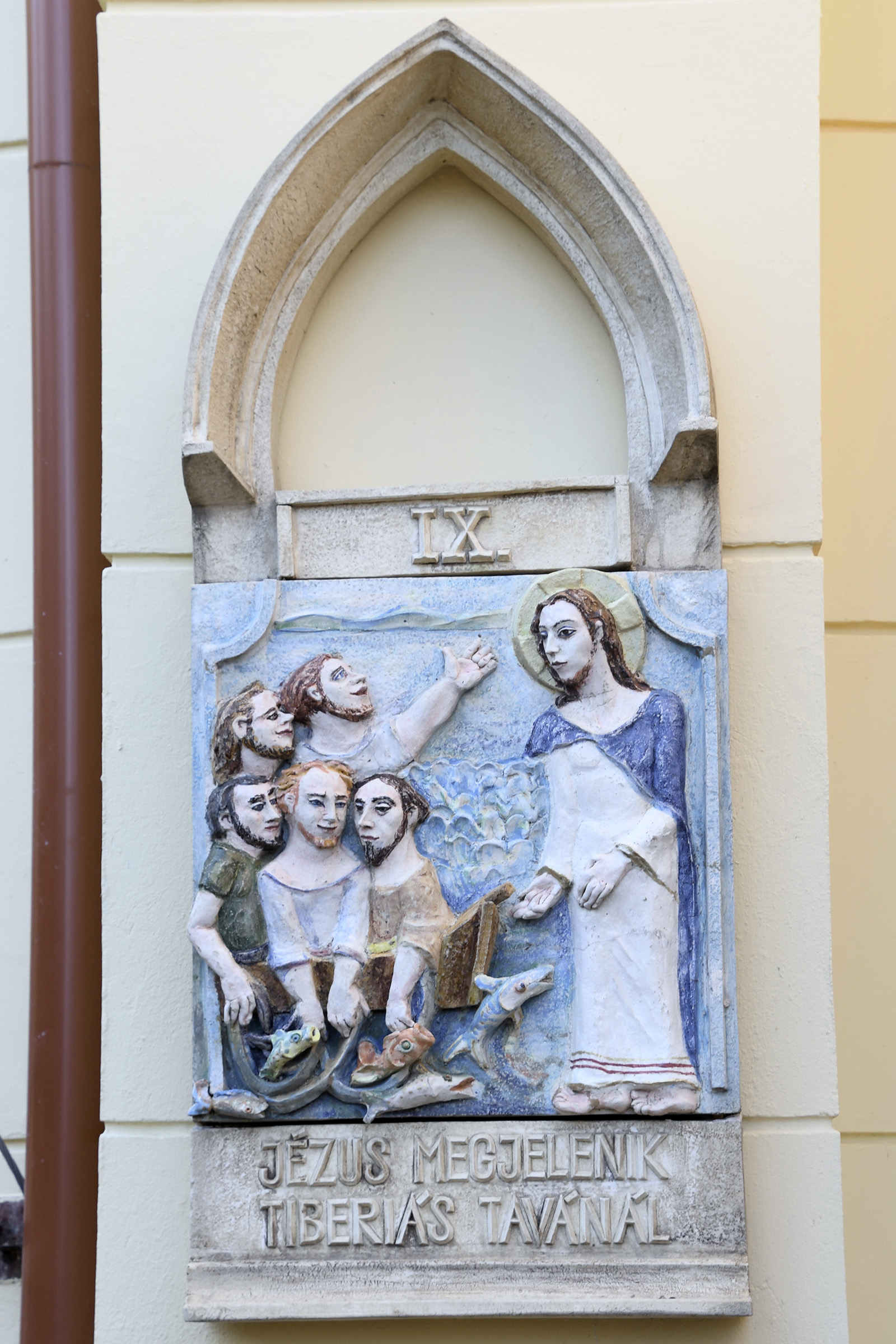
Jesus appears by Lake Tiberias

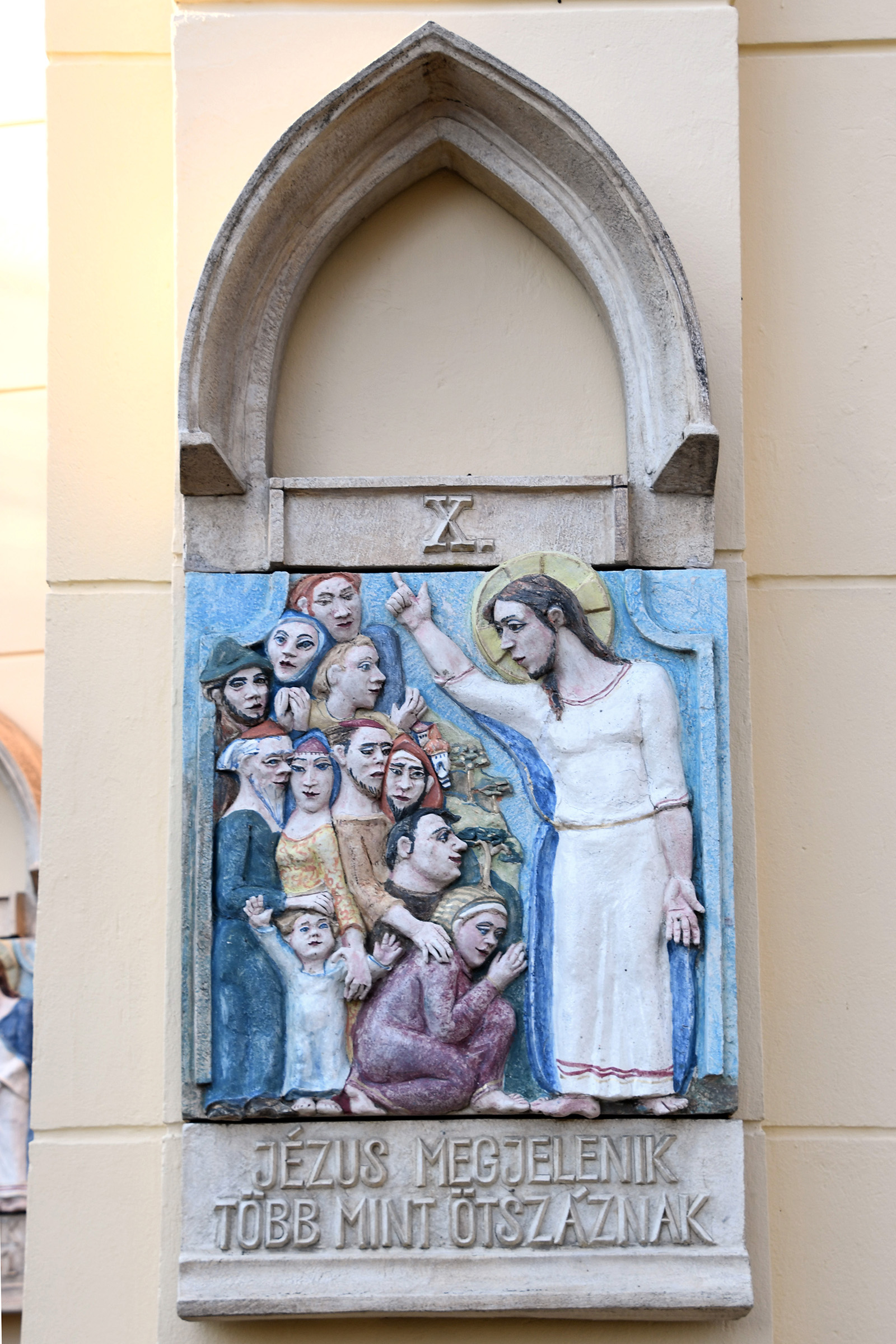
Jesus appears to the multitudes

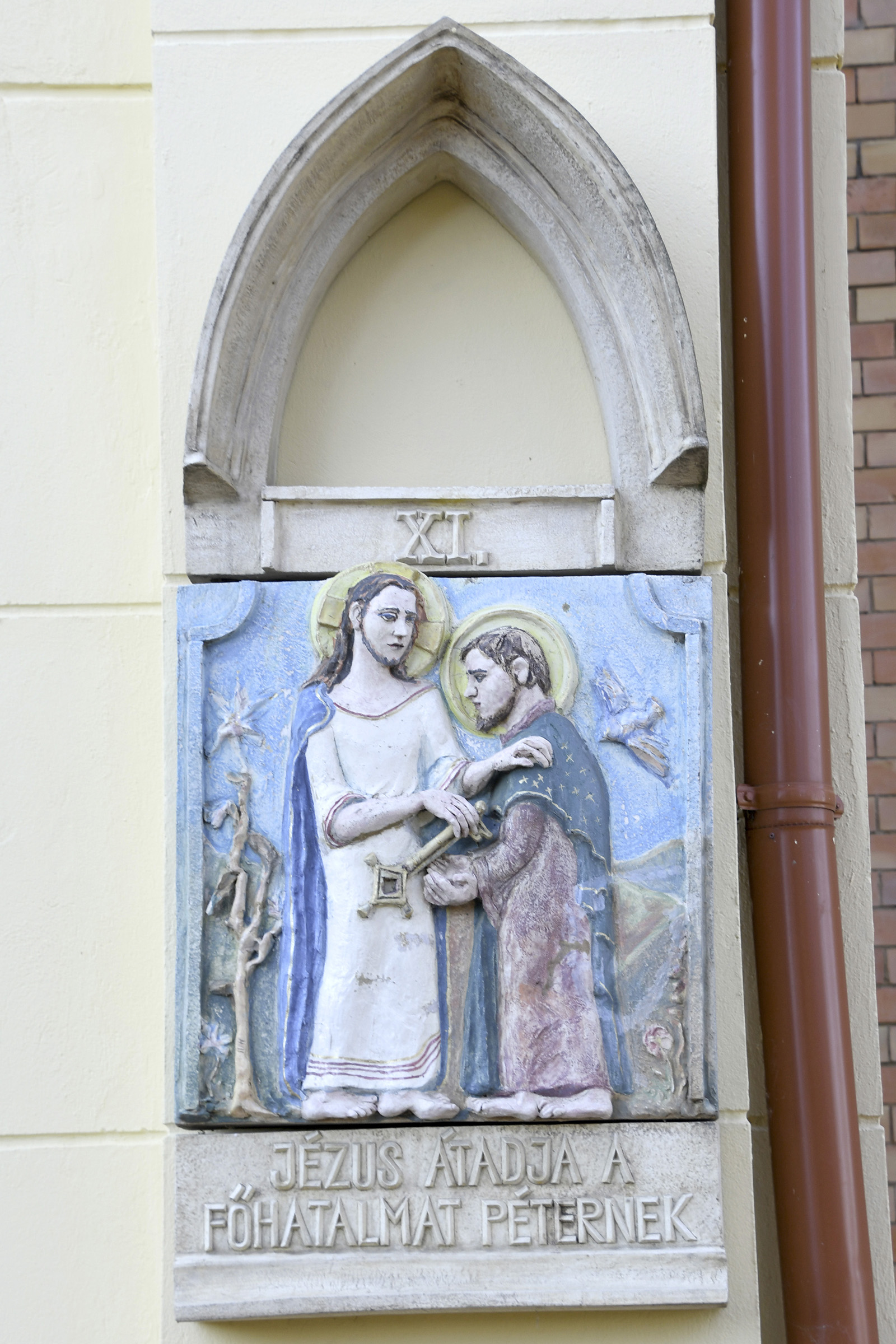
Jesus gives authority to Peter

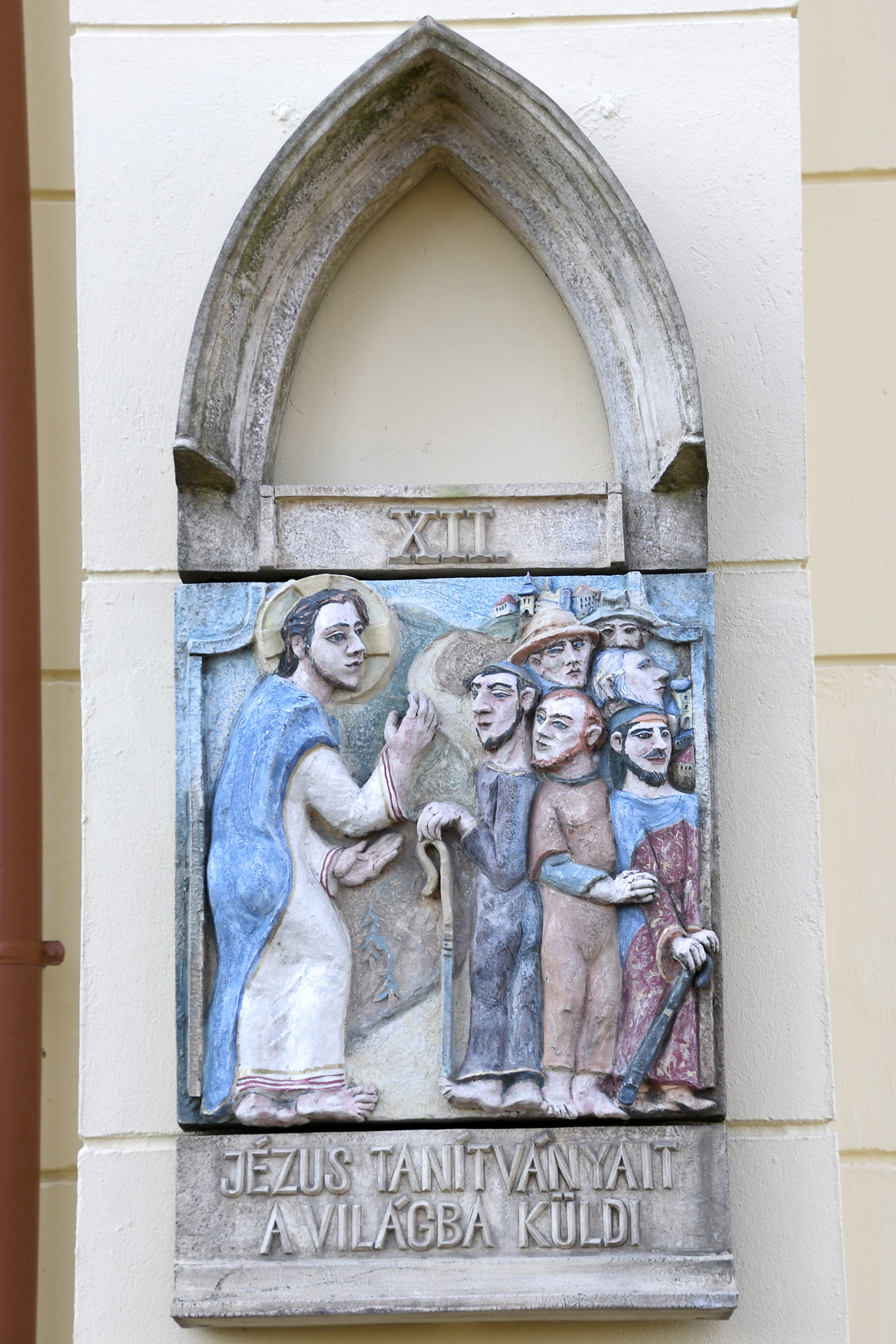
The Great Commission

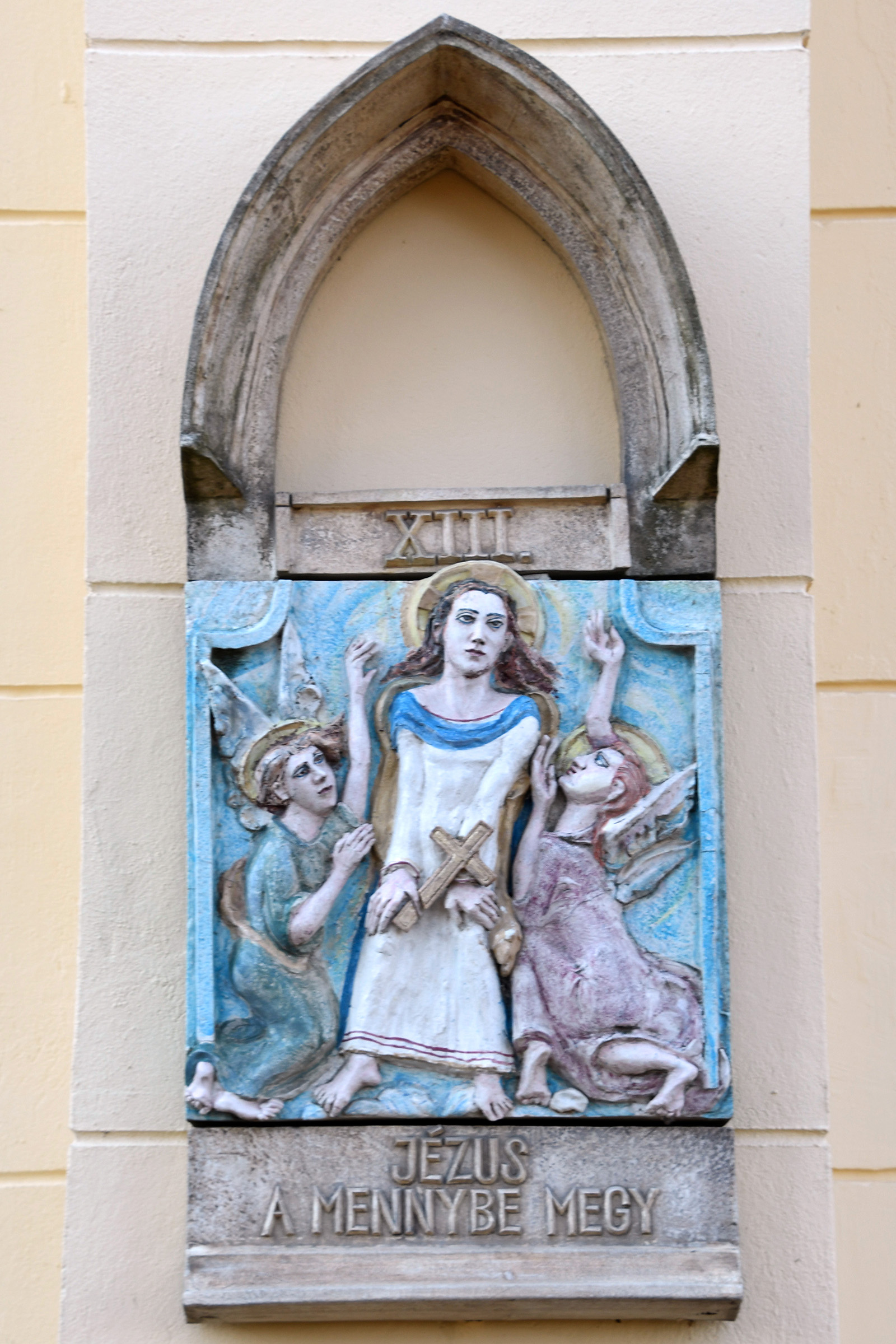
Ascension of Jesus

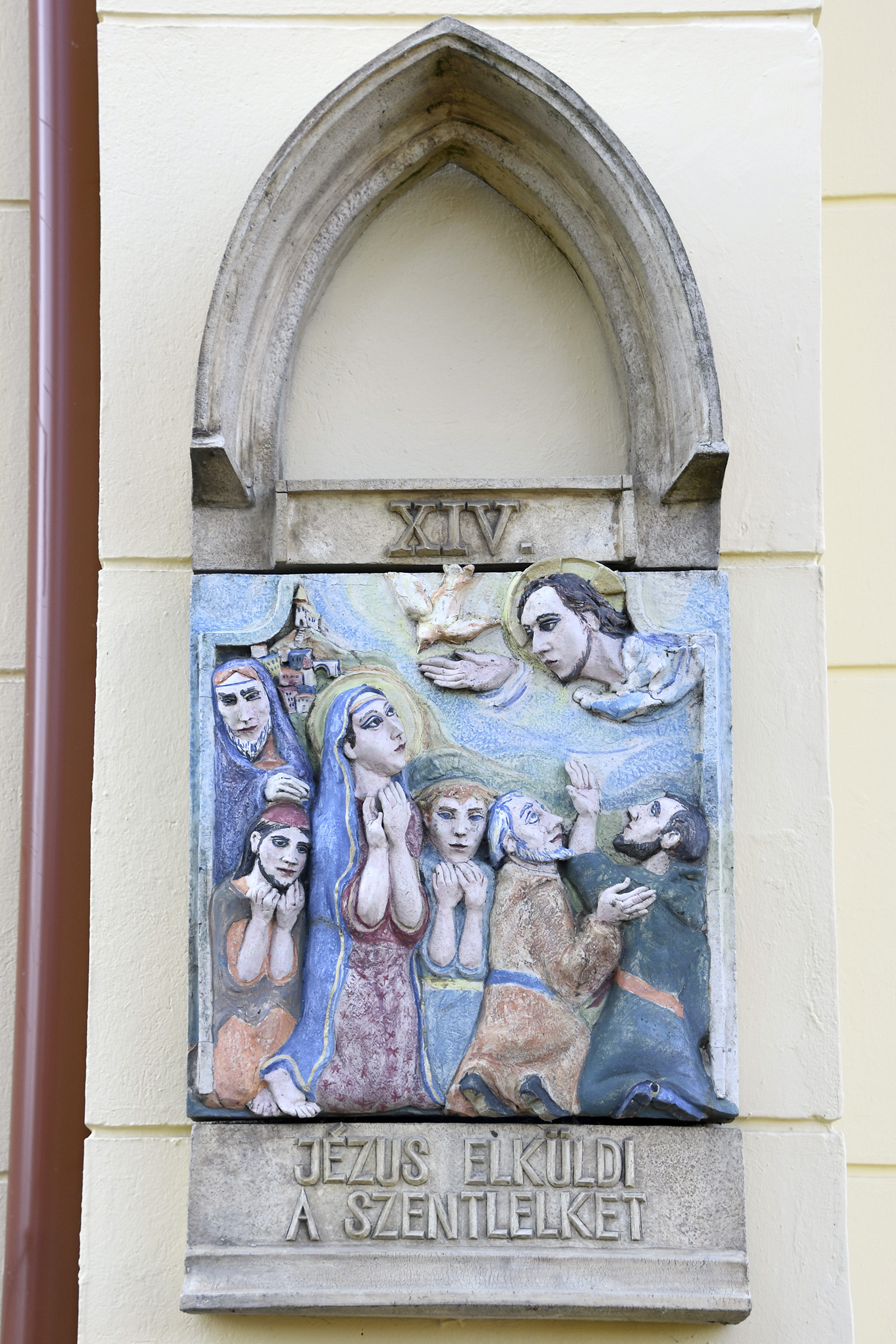
Pentecost
