= Ezekiel 5 =

Book of Ezekiel, chapter 5

- ← chapter 4 chapter 6 →
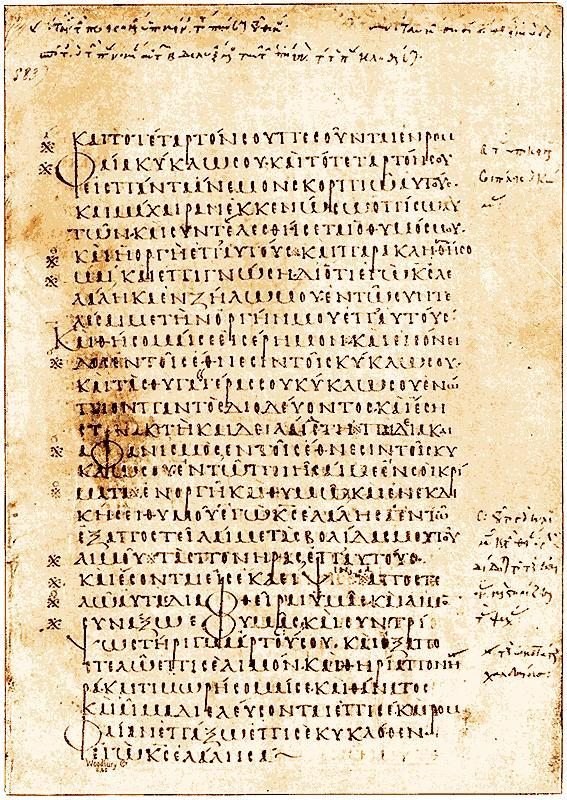
- A page containing Book of Ezekiel 5:12-17 in Codex Marchalianus (from 6th century CE).
- Book: Book of Ezekiel
- Hebrew Bible part: Nevi'im
- Order in the Hebrew part: 7
- Category: Latter Prophets
- Christian Bible part: Old Testament
- Order in the Christian part: 26

Ezekiel 5 is the fifth chapter of the Book of Ezekiel in the Hebrew Bible or the Old Testament of the Christian Bible. This book contains the prophecies attributed to the prophet/priest Ezekiel, and is one of the Prophetic Books. This chapter contains the prophecies using the division of the prophet's shaved hair as a sign (Ezekiel 5:1-4), showing God's judgment upon Jerusalem (verses 5–11), by pestilence, by famine, by the sword, and by dispersion (verses 12–17). The siege is described again in chapter 6.

== Text ==
The original text was written in the Hebrew language. This chapter is divided into 17 verses.

=== Textual witnesses ===
Some early manuscripts containing the text of this chapter in Hebrew are of the Masoretic Text, which includes the Codex Cairensis (895), the Petersburg Codex of the Prophets (916), Aleppo Codex (10th century), Codex Leningradensis (1008). Fragments containing parts of this chapter were found among the Dead Sea Scrolls including 1Q9 (1QEzek; Pre 68 CE) with the extant verse 1; and 11Q4 (11QEzek; 50 BCE–50 CE) with extant verses 11–17.

There is also a translation into Koine Greek known as the Septuagint, made in the last few centuries BC. Extant ancient manuscripts of the Septuagint version include Codex Vaticanus (B; $\mathfrak{G}$^{B}; 4th century), Codex Alexandrinus (A; $\mathfrak{G}$^{A}; 5th century) and Codex Marchalianus (Q; $\mathfrak{G}$^{Q}; 6th century). (Note: Ezekiel is missing from Codex Sinaiticus.)

== The outcome of the siege (5:1–4) ==
This section records the 'third acted prophecy of siege' to depict the fate of the people under siege. Isaiah has prophesied over a century earlier that 'Judah would be shaved by the razor of Assyria' (Isaiah 7:20). Ezekiel is to act out the prophecy, giving it a fresh meaning for its fulfilment in the immediate future.

=== Verse 1 ===
"And you, son of man, take a sharp sword, take it as a barber's razor, and pass it over your head and your beard; then take scales to weigh and divide the hair."

- "Son of man" (Hebrew: בן־אדם ḇen-'ā-ḏām): this phrase is used 93 times to address Ezekiel.
- "Razor": to depict "military defeat" (Isaiah 7:20).

Methodist commentator Joseph Benson notes that hair was "then accounted an ornament, and baldness a token of sorrow, therefore shaving denoted calamity or desolation". It was contrary to Leviticus 21:5 for a Jewish priest to cut his hair or shave his beard:

Speak to the priests, the sons of Aaron, and say to them: ... 'They shall not make any bald place on their heads, nor shall they shave the edges of their beards nor make any cuttings in their flesh'.

=== Verse 3 ===
"You shall also take a small number of them [his hair] and bind them in the edge of your garment."

This small number symbolises the remnant of the people of Judah who survived.

== The meaning of the siege signs (5:5–17) ==
Having described the complete disaster that would soon befall the besieged city, the identity of the city is finally revealed to be Jerusalem (verse 5). It is followed by the reason for the prophecies (verses 5–6a) and God's judgements for the city (verses 8ff).

== See also ==
- Jerusalem
- Son of man
- Related Bible parts: Ezekiel 3, Ezekiel 4, Ezekiel 6

== Sources ==
- Bromiley, Geoffrey W. (1995). International Standard Bible Encyclopedia: vol. iv, Q-Z. Eerdmans. ISBN 9780802837844.
- Carley, Keith W. (1974). The Book of the Prophet Ezekiel. Cambridge Bible Commentaries on the New English Bible (illustrated ed.). Cambridge University Press. ISBN 9780521097550.
- Clements, Ronald E. (1996). Ezekiel. Westminster John Knox Press. ISBN 9780664252724.
- Coogan, Michael David (2007). Cooganv, Michael David; Brettler, Marc Zvi; Newsom, Carol Ann; Perkins, Pheme (eds.). The New Oxford Annotated Bible with the Apocryphal/Deuterocanonical Books: New Revised Standard Version, Issue 48 (Augmented 3rd ed.). Oxford University Press. ISBN 9780195288810.
- Fitzmyer, Joseph A. (2008). A Guide to the Dead Sea Scrolls and Related Literature. Grand Rapids, MI: William B. Eerdmans Publishing Company. ISBN 9780802862419.
- Galambush, J. (2007). "25. Ezekiel". In Barton, John; Muddiman, John (eds.). The Oxford Bible Commentary (first (paperback) ed.). Oxford University Press. pp. 533–562. ISBN 978-0199277186.
- Joyce, Paul M. (2009). Ezekiel: A Commentary. Continuum. ISBN 9780567483614.
- Ulrich, Eugene, ed. (2010). The Biblical Qumran Scrolls: Transcriptions and Textual Variants. Brill.
- Würthwein, Ernst (1995). The Text of the Old Testament. Translated by Rhodes, Erroll F. Grand Rapids, MI: Wm. B. Eerdmans. ISBN 0-8028-0788-7.
