= Ezekiel 9 =

Book of Ezekiel, chapter 9

- ← chapter 8 chapter 10 →
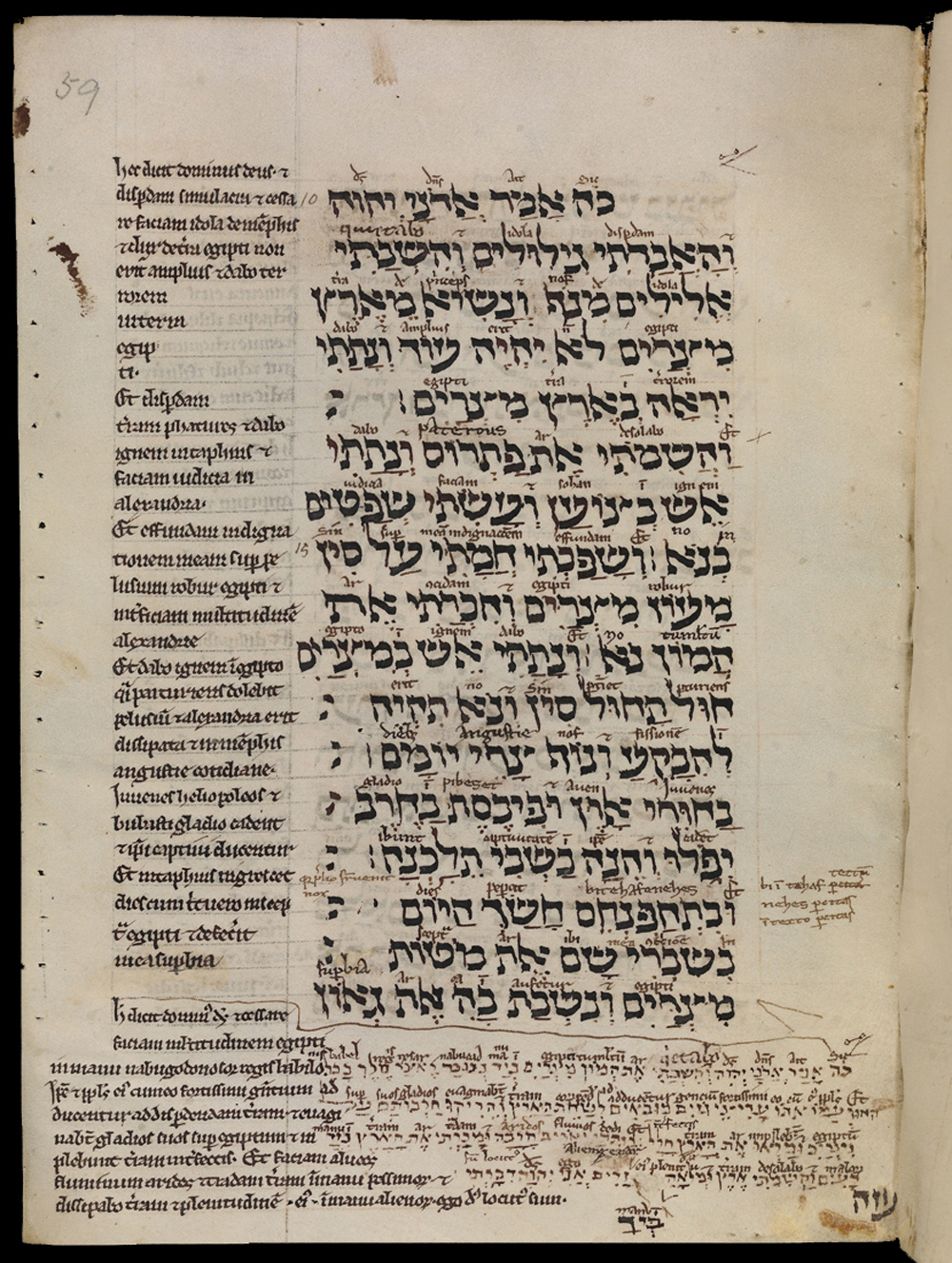
- Book of Ezekiel 30:13–18 in an English manuscript from the early 13th century, MS. Bodl. Or. 62, fol. 59a. A Latin translation appears in the margins with further interlineations above the Hebrew.
- Book: Book of Ezekiel
- Hebrew Bible part: Nevi'im
- Order in the Hebrew part: 7
- Category: Latter Prophets
- Christian Bible part: Old Testament
- Order in the Christian part: 26

Ezekiel 9 is the ninth chapter of the Book of Ezekiel in the Hebrew Bible or the Old Testament of the Christian Bible. This book contains the prophecies attributed to the prophet/priest Ezekiel, and is one of the Books of the Prophets. This chapter, sub-titled "The Wicked Are Slain" in the New King James Version, contains God's "judgment on the idolaters" who defiled the temple in Jerusalem. Ezekiel's vision of the defiled temple continues as far as Ezekiel 11:25.

== Text ==
The original text was written in the Hebrew language. This chapter is divided into 11 verses.

=== Textual witnesses ===
Some early manuscripts containing the text of this chapter in Hebrew are of the Masoretic Text tradition, which includes the Codex Cairensis (895), the Petersburg Codex of the Prophets (916), Aleppo Codex (10th century), Codex Leningradensis (1008).

There is also a translation into Koine Greek known as the Septuagint, made in the last few centuries BC. Extant ancient manuscripts of the Septuagint version include Codex Vaticanus (B; $\mathfrak{G}$^{B}; 4th century), Codex Alexandrinus (A; $\mathfrak{G}$^{A}; 5th century) and Codex Marchalianus (Q; $\mathfrak{G}$^{Q}; 6th century). (Note: Ezekiel is missing from the extant Codex Sinaiticus.)

== Verse 2 ==
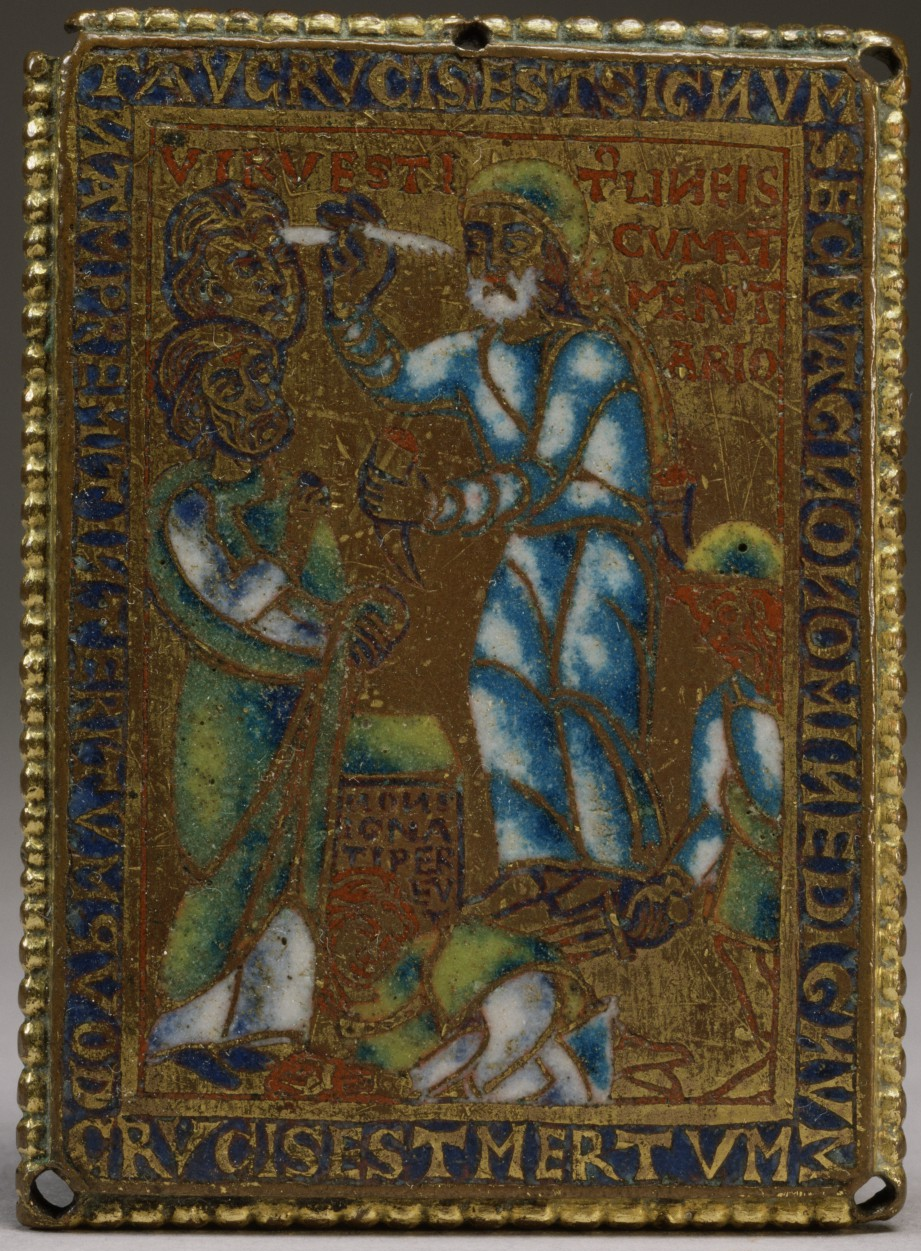
Ezekiel's Vision of the Sign "Tau" (Ezekiel 9:2-7). Champlevé enamel, copper gilt, from mid 12th century (Middle Ages).

Suddenly six men came from the direction of the upper gate, which faces north, each with his battle-ax in his hand. One man among them was clothed with linen and had a writer’s inkhorn at his side. They went in and stood beside the bronze altar.

This "one man among them", clothed in linen like the "man clothed in linen" in Daniel 10:5, was an additional, seventh, person. The high priest's garments are of linen, but these linen garments "mark the man’s divine sanctity and eminence, not [his] priestly rank".

== Verse 4 ==
Letter taw in Paleo-Hebrew alphabet.

And the Lord said unto him,
Go through the midst of the city, through the midst of Jerusalem,
and set a mark upon the foreheads of the men

that sigh and that cry for all the abominations

that be done in the midst thereof.

- "Mark" (Hebrew: תו tāw): interpreted as a "sign of exemption from judgment" (also in Ezekiel 9:6). The word "tāw" for "mark" is also for calling the last letter in Hebrew alphabet; in Paleo-Hebrew alphabet and Phoenician alphabet it was written "somewhat like the English X," (compare Revelation 7:3–4). The Benedictine writer Bernard de Montfaucon noted that some ancient Samaritan coins have the letter "thau" on them in the form of a cross, as did the coins of the Maccabees. Gesenius wrote that the Arabic equivalent of this word refers to "a sign in the form of a cross branded on the thigh or neck of horses and camels".

== Verse 6 ==
“Utterly slay old and young men, maidens and little children and women;

but do not come near anyone on whom is the mark;

and begin at My sanctuary.”
So they began with the elders who were before the temple. (NKJV)

- "On whom is the mark": gives a hint that some people will survive ("such as those with the special mark on their foreheads").
- "The elders": same as those in Ezekiel 8:16.
- "Mark": see notes on Ezekiel 9:4.

== Verse 11 ==
Just then, the man clothed with linen,

who had the inkhorn at his side, reported back and said,
“I have done as You commanded me.” (NKJV)

- "With linen" (Hebrew: הבדים ha-bad-dîm,): refers to "white linen garments."

== See also ==
- Ark of the Covenant
- Brazen Sea
- Cherub
- Inkhorn
- Israel
- Jerusalem
- Judah
- Mercy seat
- Shekinah
- Taw
- Related Bible parts: Hebrews 1, Revelation 2 Revelation 7, Revelation 9, Revelation 14, Revelation 22

== Sources ==
- Bromiley, Geoffrey W. (1995). International Standard Bible Encyclopedia: vol. iv, Q-Z. Eerdmans. ISBN 9780802837844.
- Clements, Ronald E (1996). Ezekiel. Westminster John Knox Press. ISBN 9780664252724.
- Joyce, Paul M. (2009). Ezekiel: A Commentary. Continuum. ISBN 9780567483614.
- Würthwein, Ernst (1995). The Text of the Old Testament. Translated by Rhodes, Erroll F. Grand Rapids, MI: Wm. B. Eerdmans. ISBN 0-8028-0788-7.
