= Miles Smith (historian) =

American historian and professor (born 1983)

- Born: December 1, 1983 (age 42)
- Title: Associate professor of history, Hillsdale College
- Spouse: Jamie Smith

Academic background
- Education: B.A., College of Charleston (2006); M.A., College of Charleston and the Citadel (2008); Ph.D., Texas Christian University (2013)
- Thesis: The Kentucky Colonel: Richard M. Johnson and the Rise of Western Democracy, 1780-1850 (2013)

Academic work
- Discipline: History
- Sub-discipline: Southern and Atlantic history, Anglicanism
- Institutions: Hillsdale College; Regent University
- Notable works: Religion & Republic (2024); That Blessed Liberty (2025)

Miles James Smith IV (born December 1, 1983) is an American historian. An associate professor of history at Hillsdale College, he specializes in early 19th-century American history and religion. He is the author of Religion & Republic (2024) and co-author of That Blessed Liberty (2025).

== Early life and education ==
Smith was born in 1983 and is a native of Salisbury, North Carolina. He received his undergraduate degree in history from the College of Charleston, an M.A. in history from the College of Charleston and the Citadel and his Ph.D. in history from Texas Christian University, where he wrote a dissertation on Richard Mentor Johnson.

== Career ==
Smith taught at Hillsdale as a visiting assistant professor starting in 2014 to fill a vacancy during Bradley J. Birzer's sabbatical. He was an assistant professor of history at Regent University from 2016 to 2019. Smith returned to Hillsdale to fill another sabbatical vacancy in 2021.

== Books ==
Smith published Religion & Republic: Christian America from the Founding to the Civil War, featuring a foreword by Kevin DeYoung, in 2024. Smith wrote the book in the context of the publication of several works about Christian nationalism, including those defending it and seeking to appropriate the term as well as those using the term critically. He argued that these analyses have not employed a uniform definition that has resulted in the term becoming "essentially meaningless". He argued that the American founding and the pre-Civil War Early Republic era were characterized neither by an identity as a "Christian nation" nor an aggressive secularizing disestablishment but by what he calls "Christian institutionalism," a concept in which there was no preference toward any one Protestant church at the federal level but that Protestant Christianity remained woven deeply into civic, political and educational institutions. The book examines the role of Thomas Jefferson in debates about disestablishment, then examines the presence of institutional affirmations of Christianity in legislation, judicial affairs, sabbatarian policy, U.S. diplomacy, U.S. policy toward Native Americans, and education. Religion & Republic was generally well-received by reviewers and critics, many of whom highlighted Smith's approach in finding middle ground in the Christian nationalism debate. The book was a finalist for the Ciceronian Society's 2025 Herbert J. Storing Book Prize.

In 2025, Smith and co-author Adam Carrington of Ashland University published That Blessed Liberty: Episcopal Bishops and the Development of the American Republic 1789-1860 with a foreword by Mark Tooley. Starting from the view that American Anglicans look too much to "Old World" sources on Anglican faith and practice, Smith and Carrington said they aimed to recover the Episcopal Church's expression of Anglican identity within the American constitutional settlement. To that end, the book consists of 10 biographical sketches of early American Episcopal bishops: Philander Chase, George Washington Doane, John Henry Hobart, John Henry Hopkins, Jackson Kemper, Charles Pettit McIlvaine, William Meade, James Hervey Otey, John Stark Ravenscroft and William White. The book was favorably reviewed.

== Personal life ==
Smith is a member of Holy Trinity Parish (Anglican Church in North America) in Hillsdale, Michigan, where he has served on the vestry. He is also a member of the ecclesiastical court of the Anglican Diocese of the Living Word. He is married to Jamie Smith.

== Select bibliography ==
=== Books ===
- Smith, Miles (2024). Religion & Republic: Christian America from the Founding to the Civil War. Landrum, South Carolina: Davenant Press. ISBN 978-1949716313.
- Smith, Miles; Carrington, Adam (2025). That Blessed Liberty: Episcopal Bishops and the Development of the American Republic 1789-1860. South Bend, Indiana: Prolego Press. ISBN 978-1735923086.
- Smith, Miles (2026). Valiant & Pious: The Idea of the Christian Soldier in America 1776-1918. Landrum, South Carolina: Davenant Press. ISBN 9781949716887.

=== Articles and chapters ===
- Smith, Miles (2013). "From Savannah to Vienna: William Henry Stiles, the Revolutions of 1848, and Southern Conceptions of Order". American Nineteenth Century History. 14 (1): 27–51. doi:10.1080/14664658.2012.756603. ISSN 1466-4658.
- Smith, Miles (2016). "'No Bar to Christian Communion': Slavery and the Rise of Elite Presbyterianism in South Carolina, 1800-1860". In Littlejohn, W. Bradford (ed.). For Law and for Liberty: Essays on the Trans-Atlantic Legacy of Protestant Political Thought. Landrum, South Carolina: Davenant Press. ISBN 978-0692703151.
- Smith, Miles (2017). "'The Necessary Result of Piety': Slavery and Religious Establishments in South Carolina Presbyterianism, 1800–1840". Religions. doi:10.3390/rel8090180.
- Smith, Miles (2019). "Disestablishment in South Carolina". In Esbeck, Carl H.; Den Hartog, Jonathan J. (eds.). Disestablishment and Religious Dissent: Church-State Relations in the New American States, 1776-1833. Columbia, Missouri: University of Missouri Press. ISBN 9780826274366.
- Smith, Miles (2020). "The Promise and Peril of Disestablishment: Baptist and Reformed Political Theology in the New Republic". Ad Fontes.
