= Religion & Republic =

2024 non-fiction book by Miles Smith

Religion & Republic: Christian America from the Founding to the Civil War
- Author: Miles Smith
- Language: English
- Subject: American history
- Publisher: Davenant Press
- Publication date: May 23, 2024
- Media type: Print
- Pages: 350
- ISBN: 978-1949716313

Religion & Republic: Christian America from the Founding to the Civil War is an American history book published in 2024. Written by Hillsdale College historian Miles Smith, the book argues that the early republic and westward expansion eras of U.S. history were characterized neither by Christian nationalism nor state secularism but by an environment in which Protestantism was integrated into U.S. law, diplomacy and education in a way that did not establish any particular denomination but that enshrined Protestantism as normative for American life. Published amid 21st-century debates about Christian nationalism in the United States, the book was generally well-received by reviewers. The volume includes a foreword by Presbyterian minister Kevin DeYoung.

== Background ==
Smith wrote the book in the context of the publication of several works about Christian nationalism, including those defending it and seeking to appropriate the term (Andrew Torba and Andrew Isker's Christian Nationalism and Stephen Wolfe's The Case for Christian Nationalism) as well as those using the term critically (Pamela Cooper-White's The Psychology of Christian Nationalism, Andrew Seidel's The Founding Myth, Samuel L. Perry's The Flag and the Cross, David P. Gushee's Defending Democracy from Its Christian Enemies and Katherine Stewart's The Power Worshippers, among others). Smith argued that these works have not employed a uniform definition of the term. "For some, 'Christian Nationalism' refers to the movement by Trumpist Revivalists to take over so-called 'evangelicalism.' For others, any conservative Christian socio-political commitment is 'Christian Nationalism'," he writes in the book's preface. "Because of this confusion, I fear the term has become essentially meaningless, even for those who wish to own it in good faith, and so I feel it should be set aside by both historians and ministers alike." (xvii (Note: Page numbers in parentheses refer to the 2024 paperback edition of Religion & Republic.)) According to Joel Iliff in the Journal of Church and State, Smith's work "seeks to defuse" conflicts between Christian nationalism proponents and their antagonists, of whom Iliff says many are "so-called exvangelicals who had previously been a part of the [George W.] Bush coalition." Reviewer Michael Lucchese says that Smith "consciously positions himself against both the 'revivalist folk Christianity' fueling the new right-wing nationalism and the 'en masse progressive deconstruction' inspiring the emerging evangelical Left."

== Synopsis ==
Smith argues that the American founding and the pre-Civil War Early Republic era were characterized neither by an identity as a "Christian nation" nor an aggressive secularizing disestablishment but by what he calls "Christian institutionalism": "Early Republic Protestants wanted to maintain Christian principles in their nation's various social and political institutions without sacralizing those principles or subordinating the American republic to a church." (xxv) According to Smith, the Constitution's Establishment Clause did not "remove institutional Christianity from civic, state educational, or political spheres," (1) nor did it effect the disestablishment of state churches at the state level (10). Smith also argues that this institutional Christianity is somewhat invisible to historians because it was assumed by the people of its time. "[M]ost politicians, Protestant intellectuals, and ministers did not believe that Protestant Christianity needed a state church or churches to maintain its institutional position in the American civil, political, and social order," he says. "[I]n 1788 few Americans thought they lived in anything less than Protestant-influenced society wherein religion remained institutionally entrenched." (2, 25)

Smith first engages with the role of Thomas Jefferson, who, along with James Madison and their Baptist allies in Virginia represented an extreme version of Early Republic disestablishment. Jefferson's views on religion have dominated the historiography of the founding, Smith writes. (47) He argues that the success of Virginia's church-state regime "obscured to later historians and clerics" the "continuing commitment" of Anglicans such as George Washington and Presbyterians to a close relationship between church and state institutions. (29) Smith also argues that Virginia's "particularly aggressive" approach to disestablishment was an anomaly during this period and prompted Jefferson's political opponents to use it as a rhetorical cudgel against him and the Democratic-Republicans. (31, 33) Jefferson's views prompted even some of his ideological allies, such as Patrick Henry, to resist his approach to church and state policy. (41) As a result, Jefferson's views and policy preferences were not representative of the Early Republic approach to institutional Christianity. (54–55)

In subsequent chapters, Smith then examines the presence of institutional affirmations of Christianity in legislation, judicial affairs, sabbatarian policy, U.S. diplomacy, U.S. policy toward Native Americans, and education. He writes that Early Republic legislators conceived differently of the First Amendment than modern Americans do and thus maintained state-level religious tests, with New York effectively barring Roman Catholics and Jews from public office. (64) Smith focuses on the Northwest Ordinance (which declared religion "necessary to good government and the happiness of mankind") and the constitutions in the states that were formed from the Northwest Territory. For example, the constitution of Ohio legally favored Christianity and the state criminalized blasphemy for three decades after statehood (14, 66–68) Vermont law forced Sabbath observance starting in 1797 and other New England states passed strict Sabbath laws. (71–73) State policy toward slavery was also strongly influenced by religion, Smith writes. "Northern legislators across the free states politicized Protestant expressions of divine sovereignty in the defense of the antislavery cause as much as southern lawmakers used Protestant theology to defend slavery; the question of Protestantism's place in state law was not if it existed, but what form it took." (84, emphasis in original) Most states generally maintained blue laws, and Smith's chapter on sabbath laws examines a national debate over banning Sunday delivery of U.S. mail between figures like Lyman Beecher, Theodore Frelinghuysen and William McCreery (who supported the ban) and Richard Mentor Johnson and John Leland (who opposed it). The debate over Sunday mail delivery showed that "Congress and the United States were already Christian and already reverenced the Sabbath," Smith writes. According to opponents of a ban, such a policy would represent "a denominational establishment" favoring strict-sabbatarian Presbyterians and Reformed congregationalists. (137)

Meanwhile, federal judges (especially those, like Chief Justice John Marshall, appointed by Federalist presidents) affirmed the role of Protestant Christianity in American politics and law. (88, 93) The U.S. Supreme Court rejected Jeffersonian Spencer Roane's proposal for stripping churches of their ability to own property, finding in the unanimous 1815 Terrett v. Taylor decision that disestablishment did not mean require the "abolition of all religious corporations". "State legislatures, therefore, could only remove exclusive principles from churches, but could not remove privileges given to churches from the state or from natural law," Smith summarizes. (99–101) Courts also upheld state laws on blasphemy, according to Smith "because Christian citizens retained a natural right to punish blasphemy, but they needed institutions to do so in an orderly fashion." (105–106)

During the Early Republic period, Smith argues that American diplomacy represented the United States as a Protestant order and that Protestantism was embedded in diplomatic activities. (150) Diplomatic officers viewed the United States as a providential actor—God's instrument for ordering and saving the world. (152) U.S. treaties with Protestant European states (the Netherlands, Sweden and Prussia) included provisions on freedom of conscience not present in treaties with Catholic France and Spain. (155–56) John Quincy Adams, a future president who was a preeminent diplomat of his day, "saw public morality and religion—particularly Christianity—as vital to the maintenance of republican virtue," Smith writes. (161) He views the 1797 Treaty of Tripoli, which included a clause stating that the U.S. government was not founded in Christianity (a claim that undergirds claims of a secularist U.S. founding), as flimsy evidence for American rejection of a Christian order. (163–65) Smith also argues that the thinly staffed U.S. diplomatic system in the Early Republic relied on Protestant missionaries as de facto agents of U.S. diplomacy. (172) As westward expansion threatened treaties the United States had made with Native Americans, Protestant missionaries were also among the most ardent defenders of Native American land claims while supporting Native American assimilation. (184) The conflict over Indian removal represented a conflict between two religious expressions within the United States: revivalist evangelical frontierspeople (inheritors of the more secular Jeffersonian tradition) seeking more land for settlement and magisterial Protestant leaders who supported the Christianized Indian tribes like the Cherokee and fretted about "uncivilized" frontier settlers. (191–94)

Smith argues that public educational institutions in the Early Republic were generally institutionally Christian: including Christian studies in the curriculum, maintaining chapel services, hiring staff chaplains and appointing ordained ministers as university officials. These institutions included the future University of Delaware, the University of Georgia, Miami University of Ohio, the University of Michigan, the University of North Carolina at Chapel Hill, Ohio University, the future University of South Carolina and the University of Wisconsin–Madison. Only Jefferson's University of Virginia "made any pretense to being meaningfully non-sectarian," he writes. (214) "Publicly funded universities in the United States imbued their students with the belief that Christianity was necessary for the success of the American republic and that it was synonymous with civilization." (223) Smith concludes that between the founding and the Civil War:

Christians in the United States saw their country as deeply committed to the maintenance of Christian institutionalism in state legislatures, the courts, Sabbath laws, diplomacy, missionary enterprises, and relationships with Native Americans, and in state colleges and universities. This commitment to Christian institutions transcended questions of state churches and establishment or disestablishment. (243)

== Reception ==
Religion & Republic was generally well-received by reviewers and critics. In Themelios, Brady Greaves calls Religion & Republic "a well-sourced argument in favor of viewing the early American republic as a fundamentally Protestant nation."

Several reviewers highlighted Smith's approach in handling the two sides of the Christian nationalism debate. In National Review, Bradley J. Birzer praised Smith for "choos[ing] a middle path" between Jeffersonian secularism and the evangelicalism of the Great Awakenings in his historiography and ending up "being far more innovative and insightful than those who have claimed either Enlightenment or Evangelicalism." Likewise, Philip Bunn in Religious Studies Review praises Smith's evenhanded tone and says that neither side's "culture war" combatants would find an ally in Smith. In Providence magazine, Jeffrey Cimmino says Smith "found a narrow but vital channel . . . [b]etween the Scylla of a totally sacralized state and the Charybdis of total separation between church and state."

Bunn also praises Smith for avoiding heavily trodden historical ground, such as the personal religious beliefs of the Founding Fathers, and instead focusing on legislative text, judicial opinions, speeches, sermons and other public expressions of Early Republican views about Christianity in civic life. For example, Bunn highlights Smith's treatment of the Sunday mail delivery debate, noting Smith's contention that the argument against the "hardline sabbatarians" was made with "explicitly Christian rebuttals: to enforce New England Sabbath laws against federal employees would be, in effect, to establish a Calvinist consensus at the federal level." Bunn also describes Smith's discussion of the Indian removal controversies as "casting new light" on the period:

Smith makes the case that those advocating for removal, isolation, and segmentation between the populations are inheritors of the more secular impulses of the democratic republicans. Those who supported missionary service to the Natives provided a translation of the Bible into Native languages and, more generally, sought some sort of integration between Natives and white Americans were inheritors of the more religiously soaked Federalist tradition. . . . Smith's history complicates the story while importantly avoiding lionizing either party.

Joel Iliff notes that Smith's argument parallels one made by David Sehat in the 2011 volume The Myth of American Religious Freedom and chides Smith for not engaging with or even citing Sehat. Greaves also critically notes Smith's polemical tone toward evangelicalism in the preface. However, Michael Lucchese says this polemic comes from Smith's analysis that early American religion was more rooted in "historic Anglican, Lutheran, and Calvinist expressions of the faith than the more charismatic or biblicist approaches common in nondenominational churches and evangelical seminaries today." Greaves also observes the book's abundance of typographical errors.

Religion & Republic was a finalist for the Ciceronian Society's 2025 Herbert J. Storing Book Prize.

== See also ==
- American civil religion
