= Textual variants in the Book of Deuteronomy =

Differences in Book of Deuteronomy manuscripts

Textual variants in the Book of Deuteronomy concerns textual variants in the Hebrew Bible found in the Book of Deuteronomy.

== Legend ==
Purported inter-relationship between significant ancient Old Testament manuscripts (some identified by their siglum).

Frequently used sigla (symbols and abbreviations) of Hebrew Bible manuscripts and editions include:

א: Codex Sinaiticus
A: Codex Alexandrinus
B: Codex Vaticanus (Roman Septuagint)
C: Codex Ephraemi Rescriptus
ABP: Apostolic Bible Polyglot
AC: Aleppo Codex
BHS: Biblia Hebraica Stuttgartensia
Brenton: Brenton's Septuagint Translation 1879
LC: Leningrad Codex
LXX: Septuagint (list)
LXX^{Rahlfs}: Rahlfs' Septuagint 1935
LXX^{Swete}: Swete's Septuagint 1930
K: ketiv
Kennicott^{x}: Kennicott's Vetus Test. Hebraicum
MAM: Miqra according to the Masorah
m.: Mishna
MT or 𝕸: Masoretic Text
MT^{Ginsburg}: C.D. Ginsburg's Masoretic Text
OL or: Old Latin / Vetus Latina (list)
Q: qere
xQx: Dead Sea Scrolls (list)
S: Peshitta
SP: Samaritan Pentateuch
Tg: Targum
Tg^{Be}: Targum Berlin Orientalis 1213
Tg^{J}: Targum Jonathan
Tg^{O}: Targum Onqelos
Tg^{N}: Targum Neofiti
Tg^{PJ}: Targum Pseudo-Jonathan
Vg: Vulgate (list)
Vg^{Clement}: Clementine Vulgate 1592
Vg^{Colunga&Turrado}: A. Colunga & L. Turrado's Vulgata 1946
Vg^{neo}: Nova Vulgata 1979
WLC: Westminster Leningrad Codex

== List ==
This list provides examples of known textual variants, and contains the following parameters: Hebrew texts written right to left, the Hebrew text romanised left to right, an approximate English translation, and which Hebrew manuscripts or critical editions of the Hebrew Bible this textual variant can be found in. Greek (Septuagint) and Latin (Vulgate) texts are written left to right, and not romanised. Sometimes additional translation or interpretation notes are added, with references to similar verses elsewhere, or in-depth articles on the topic in question.

=== Deuteronomy 5 ===
Deuteronomy 5 in Brenton's Septuagint translation (1879)

Deuteronomy 5:6, see also I am the Lord thy God

אָֽנֹכִי֙ יְהוָ֣ה אֱלֹהֶ֔יךָ, ’ā-nō-ḵî Yah-weh ’ĕ-lō-he-ḵā,, 'I Yahweh your god' – WLC
Ἐγώ Κύριος ὁ θεός σου, 'I Lord the god of yours' – LXX^{Swete} – LXX^{Rahlfs}
εγώ ειμι κύριος ο θεός σου, 'I am Lord the god of yours' – Brenton ABP
Ego Dominus Deus tuus, 'I Lord your God' – Vg^{Colunga&Turrado}

Compare Exodus 20:2.

Deuteronomy 5:7, see also Thou shalt have no other gods before me

לֹ֣א יִהְיֶ֥ה־לְךָ֛֩ אֱלֹהִ֥֨ים אֲחֵרִ֖֜ים עַל־פָּנָֽ֗יַ׃, lō yih-yeh- lə-ḵā ’ĕ-lō-hîm ’ă-ḥê-rîm ‘al- pā-nā-ya., 'You shall not have other/further gods over/against/above/beside me' – WLC SP
לוא יִהְיֶ֥ה לְךָ֛֩ אלוהים אֲחֵרִ֖֜ים עַל־פָּנָֽ֗יַ, l-v-a yih-yeh- lə-ḵā l-v-h-m ’ă-ḥê-rîm ‘al- pā-nā-ya, 'You shall not have other/further gods over/against/above/beside me' – 4QDeut^{n} (4QDeut^{j})
Οὐκ ἔσονταί σοι θεοὶ ἕτεροι πρὸ προσώπου μου., 'There shall not be other gods to you before my face.' – LXX^{Swete} LXX^{Rahlfs} Brenton ABP
Non habebis deos alienos in conspectu meo., '[You] shall have no alien/foreign/strange gods in my sight/presence/proximity.' – Vg^{Colunga&Turrado}

Compare Exodus 20:3.

Deuteronomy 5:11, see also Thou shalt not take the name of the Lord thy God in vain

λήψη, 'shall take' – ABP Brenton (classical Greek spelling)
λήμψῃ, 'shall take' – LXX^{Swete} LXX^{Rahlfs} (Koine Greek spelling)

Compare Exodus 20:7.

Deuteronomy 5:11, see also Thou shalt not take the name of the Lord thy God in vain

לֹ֤א יְנַקֶּה֙ יְהוָ֔ה, lō yə-naq-qeh Yah-weh, 'Yahweh will not acquit / leave unpunished / hold guiltless' – WLC
μὴ καθαρίσῃ Κύριος, '[the] Lord shall not cleanse' – LXX^{Swete} LXX^{Rahlfs}. κᾰθᾰρός ("clean, pure") is the origin of the terms catharsis and Catharism.
μὴ καθαρίσῃ Κύριος ὁ Θεός σου, '[the] Lord your God shall not cleanse' – Brenton
μὴ καθαρίσει Κύριος ο θεός σου, '[the] Lord your god shall not cleanse' – ABP
non erit impunitus, '[he] will not be unpunished' – Vg^{Colunga&Turrado}. impunitus is the root of the term impunity.

Compare Exodus 20:7.

Deuteronomy 5:14, see also Remember the sabbath day, to keep it holy

וְגֵרְךָ֖֙ אֲשֶׁ֥֣ר בִּשְׁעָרֶֽ֔יךָ ׃, wə-ḡê-rə-ḵā ’ă-šer biš-‘ā-re-ḵā,, 'your stranger/sojourner who [is] within your gates' – WLC
καὶ (ὁ) προσήλυτος ὁ παροικῶν ἐν σοί., 'and the proselyte/convert the [one] sojourning among you.' – LXX^{Swete} LXX^{Rahlfs} Brenton (no 'ὁ') ABP
et peregrinus qui est intra portas tuas., 'and [the] traveller who is within your gates.' – Vg^{Colunga&Turrado}

Compare Exodus 20:10.

Deuteronomy 5:15, see also Remember the sabbath day, to keep it holy

בְּאֶ֣רֶץ מִצְרַ֔֗יִם, bə-’e-reṣ miṣ-ra-yim,, 'in the land of Egypt,' – WLC
ἐν γῇ Αἰγύπτῳ,, 'in [the] land of Egypt,' – LXX^{Swete} LXX^{Rahlfs} Brenton ABP
in Ægypto,, 'in Egypt,' – Vg^{Colunga&Turrado}

Compare Exodus 20:11 (an entirely different sentence in all witnesses, which supports Sabbath observance by reference to the Genesis creation narrative rather than the Exodus).

Deuteronomy 5:15, see also Remember the sabbath day, to keep it holy

καὶ ἁγιάζειν αὐτήν., 'and to sanctify it.' – LXX^{Swete} LXX^{Rahlfs} Brenton ABP
omitted – WLC Vg^{Colunga&Turrado}

Compare Exodus 20:11: וַֽיְקַדְּשֵֽׁהוּ׃, way-qad-də-šê-hū. s, 'and (he) consecrated it.' καὶ ηγίασε αὐτήν., 'and [he] sanctified it.' et sanctificavit eum., 'and [he] sanctified it.'.

Deuteronomy 5:16, see also Honour thy father and thy mother

לְמַ֣עַן ׀ יַאֲרִיכֻ֣ן יָמֶ֗יךָ, lə-ma-‘an ya-’ă-rî-ḵun yā-me-ḵā, 'that your days/times may be long [plural]' – WLC
μακροχρόνιοι ἦτε, 'long times may [you] be [plural]' – LXX^{Swete}
μακροχρόνιος γένη, '[a] long time may [you] happen [singular]' – LXX^{Rahlfs} Brenton ABP
longo vivas tempore, '(during a) long time may [you] live [singular]' – Vg^{Colunga&Turrado}

Compare Exodus 20:12.

Deuteronomy 5:16, see also Honour thy father and thy mother

וּלְמַ֙עַן֙ יִ֣יטַב לָ֔ךְ, ū-lə-ma-‘an yî-ṭaḇ lāḵ, 'that it may be [singular] well with you' – WLC
ίνα ευ σοι γένηται, 'in order that good [things] should happen [plural] to you' – LXX^{Swete} LXX^{Rahlfs} Brenton ABP (mentioned before καὶ ἵνα μακροχρόνιοι ἦτε / καὶ ἵνα μακροχρόνιοι ἦτε)
et bene sit tibi, 'and [it] may be [singular] well with/for you' – Vg^{Colunga&Turrado}

Compare Exodus 20:12 (where this phrase is omitted in Hebrew and Latin witnesses, but identical in Greek witnesses).

Deuteronomy 5:17–19, see also Thou shalt not kill, Thou shalt not commit adultery and Thou shalt not steal

לֹ֥֖א תִּֿרְצָֽח׃ ס וְלֹ֖֣א תִּֿנְאָֽ֑ף׃ סוְלֹ֖֣א תִּֿגְנֹֽ֔ב׃ ס, lō trə-ṣāḥ. s wə-lō tnə-’āp̄. s wə-lō tḡə-nōḇ. s, '[You] shall not murder. And [you] shall not commit adultery. And [you] shall not steal.' – WLC
Οὐ μοιχεύσεις. Οὐ φονεύσεις. Οὐ κλέψεις., '[You] shall not commit adultery. [You] shall not murder. [You] shall not steal.' – LXX^{Swete} LXX^{Rahlfs}
Οὐ φονεύσεις. Οὐ μοιχεύσεις. Οὐ κλέψεις., '[You] shall not murder. [You] shall not commit adultery. [You] shall not steal.' – Brenton ABP
Non occides, neque moechaberis, furtumque non facies:, '[You] shall not kill/slay, nor shall [you] commit adultery, and theft [you] shall not commit:' – Vg^{Colunga&Turrado}

Compare Exodus 20:13–15.

Deuteronomy 5:21, see also Thou shalt not covet

ούτε παντός κτήνους αυτού, 'nor any of his cattle/beasts [of burden]' – LXX^{Swete} LXX^{Rahlfs} Brenton ABP
omitted – WLC Vg^{Colunga&Turrado}

Compare Exodus 20:17.

Deuteronomy 5:21, see also Thou shalt not covet

כֹ֖ל, ḵōl, 'all/everything/anything' – WLC
πάντα, 'all or any/every [thing]' – Brenton ABP
universa, 'all [things] (combined) or [the] whole [of things]' – Vg^{Colunga&Turrado}
omitted – LXX^{Swete} LXX^{Rahlfs}

Compare Exodus 20:17.

=== Deuteronomy 22 ===
Deuteronomy 22:25

הַנַּעַר, han-na-‘ar, 'a boy or a young man' – K
הַֽנַּעֲרָה֙, han-na-‘ar-rāh, 'a girl/damsel or a young woman' – Q SP
την παίδα, 'a child/boy/girl' – LXX^{Swete} ABP Brenton

Deuteronomy 22:25

וּמֵ֗ת הָאִ֛ישׁ, ū-mêṯ hā-’îš, 'then the man shall die' – MT
αποκτενείτε τον άνθρωπον, 'you shall kill the man' – ABP
ἀποκτενεῖτε, 'you shall kill' – LXX^{Swete} Brenton

Deuteronomy 22:26

־[ולנער] (וְלַֽנַּעֲרָה֙) לֹא־תַעֲשֶׂ֣ה דָבָ֔ר, [wə·lan·na·‘ar] (wə·lan·na·‘ă·rāh) lō- ṯa-‘ă-śeh ḏā-ḇār,, '(But [to] the young woman) you shall not do anything;' – WLC
τη δε νεάνιδι ου ποιήσετε ουδέν, 'but to the young woman you shall not do anything,' – ABP
omitted – LXX^{Swete} Brenton

Deuteronomy 22:26

אֵ֥ין [לַנַּעַר כ] (לַֽנַּעֲרָ֖ה ק) חֵ֣טְא מָ֑וֶת כִּ֡י כַּאֲשֶׁר֩ כִּ֡י, ’ên [lan·na·‘ar] (lan·na·‘ă·rāh) ḥêṭ mā·weṯ; kî, '[there is] not [to] (the young woman) a sin [worthy] of death. For' – WLC
ουκ έστι τη νεάνιδι αμάρτημα θανάτου. ότι ως, 'there is not to the young woman a sin [worthy] of death. For as' – ABP
καὶ τῇ νεάνιδι οὐκ ἔστιν ἁμάρτημα θανάτου. ὡς, 'and to the young woman there is no sin [worthy] of death. As' – LXX^{Swete} Brenton

Deuteronomy 22:28, see also Rape in the Hebrew Bible § Deuteronomy 22:28–29

כִּֽי־יִמְצָ֣א אִ֗ישׁ, kî- yim-ṣā ’îš,, 'If a man finds' – WLC
Ἐὰν δέ τις εὕρῃ, 'And if anyone finds' – LXX^{Swete} ABP Brenton

Deuteronomy 22:28, see also Rape in the Hebrew Bible § Deuteronomy 22:28–29

וּתְפָשָׂ֖הּ, ū-ṯə-p̄ā-śāh, 'and he seizes her' – WLC
και βιασάμενος αυτήν, 'and using force on her' – ABP
καὶ βιασάμενος, 'and using force or and [if] he should force [her]' – LXX^{Swete} Brenton

Deuteronomy 22:28, see also Rape in the Hebrew Bible § Deuteronomy 22:28–29

וְנִמְצָֽאוּ׃, wə-nim-ṣā-’ū., 'and [they] are found,' – WLC
καὶ εὑρεθῇ·, 'and [he] should be found' – LXX^{Swete} ABP Brenton

Deuteronomy 22:29, see also Rape in the Hebrew Bible § Deuteronomy 22:28–29

חֲמִשִּׁ֣ים כָּ֑סֶף, ḥă-miš-šîm kā-sep̄;, 'fifty of silver' – WLC
πεντήκοντα δίδραχμα αργυρίου, 'fifty double-drachmas of silver or fifty silver didrachms' – LXX^{Swete} ABP Brenton

Deuteronomy 22:29, see also Rape in the Hebrew Bible § Deuteronomy 22:28–29

לֹא־יוּכַ֥ל, lō- yū-ḵal, 'he shall not be permitted' – WLC
οὐ δυνήσεται, 'he will not be able' – LXX^{Swete} ABP Brenton

Deuteronomy 22:29, see also Rape in the Hebrew Bible § Deuteronomy 22:28–29

כָּל־יָמָֽיו׃ ס, kāl- yā-māw. s, 'all his days' – WLC
τὸν ἅπαντα χρόνον, 'at any time' – LXX^{Swete} ABP Brenton

Deuteronomy 22:30

λήψεται, 'shall take' – ABP Brenton (classical Greek spelling)
λήμψεται, 'shall take' – LXX^{Swete} (Koine Greek spelling)

Compare Songs 2:6.

Deuteronomy 22:30

συγκάλυμμα, 'skirt or marriage veil' – ABP Brenton
συνκάλυμμα, 'skirt' – LXX^{Swete}

=== Deuteronomy 28 ===
Deuteronomy 28:30, see also Rape in the Hebrew Bible § Deuteronomy 28

יִשְׁכָּבֶ֔נָּה, yiš-kā-ḇen-nāh,, 'will rape her' – Q
יִשְׁגָּלֶנָּה – K
ישכב – SP
ἕξει αὐτήν·, 'shall have/hold her' – LXX^{Swete} ABP Brenton

Deuteronomy 28:30, see also Rape in the Hebrew Bible § Deuteronomy 28

עמה, ‘am-māh, 'people' – SP
omitted – MT

== See also ==
- List of Hebrew Bible manuscripts

== Bibliography ==
- Biblos.com & Helps Ministries (2011–2018). "Interlinear Bible (Westminster Leningrad Codex – English)". Biblehub.com.
- Brenton, Lancelot Charles Lee (1851). "Brenton's Septuagint Translation". Biblehub.com.
- Brenton, Lancelot Charles Lee (1879). The Septuagint version of the OT, with an English translation (PDF). London: Samuel Bagster. p. 1156.
- Rahlfs, Alfred (1935). "Δευτερονόμιον (Deuteronomy Rahlfs)". Alfred Rahlfs' edition of the Septuagint (in Greek). Greek Wikisource.
- Scholz, Susanne (2021). Sacred Witness. Rape in the Hebrew Bible. Fortress Press. ISBN 9781506482033. (E-book edition)
- Swete, Henry Barclay (1930). "Swete's Septuagint". Biblehub.com.
- Emanuel Tov, The Text-Critical Use of the Septuagint in Biblical Research (TCU), 1981 (1st edition), 1997 (2nd edition), 2015 (3rd edition).
- Emanuel Tov, Textual Criticism of the Hebrew Bible (TCHB), 1992 (1st edition), 2001 (2nd edition), 2012 (3rd edition).
- Emanuel Tov, Textual Criticism of the Hebrew Bible, Qumran, Septuagint: Collected Writings, Volume 3 (2015).
- Tov, Emanuel (1999). "38. The Septuagint Additions ('Miscellanies') in 1 Kings 2 (3 Reigns 2)". The Greek and Hebrew Bible: Collected Essays on the Septuagint. Vetus Testamentum Supplements. Vol. 72. Leiden: Brill.
- van de Giessen, J. P. (2003). "Index Bijbelverzen". bijbelaantekeningen.nl (in Dutch).
- Van der Pool, Charles (1996). "Apostolic Bible Polyglot (ABP)". Biblehub.com.
