= That Blessed Liberty =

2025 book on Episcopal bishops and theology

That Blessed Liberty: Episcopal Bishops and the Development of the American Republic 1789-1860
- Authors: Miles Smith IV and Adam Carrington
- Language: English
- Subject: Religious history
- Publisher: Prolego Press
- Publication date: September 19, 2025
- Media type: Print
- Pages: 179
- ISBN: 978-1735923086

That Blessed Liberty: Episcopal Bishops and the Development of the American Republic 1789-1860 is an American history book published in 2025. It is a study of 10 Episcopal bishops from the early decades of the American republic and how they contributed to the development of Anglicanism in the United States. Written by historians Miles Smith IV of Hillsdale College and Adam Carrington of Ashland University, the book includes a foreword by Mark Tooley. It was favorably reviewed upon its release.

== Synopsis ==
Starting from the view that American Anglicans look too much to "Old World" sources on Anglican faith and practice, Smith and Carrington seek to recover the Episcopal Church's unique expression of Anglican identity within the American constitutional settlement. To that end, the book consists of 10 biographical sketches of early American Episcopal bishops: Philander Chase, George Washington Doane, John Henry Hobart, John Henry Hopkins, Jackson Kemper, Charles Pettit McIlvaine, William Meade, James Hervey Otey, John Stark Ravenscroft and William White.

Smith and Carrington examine how these bishops shaped the Protestant Episcopal Church in a post-Revolution context in which Anglicanism had fallen out of favor amid anti-English sentiment. As the first presiding bishop, White led several early changes to help Anglicanism recover in the United States, including: disestablishment while maintaining the historic episcopate; institutionalizing participation by the laity in an analogue to U.S. political federalism; and creating a structure through the General Convention to unite disparate dioceses. Additional strategies pursued by other included evolving the Book of Common Prayer for a republican environment, launching missionary movements to marginalized groups (such as Native Americans) and pursuing social reform.

Smith and Carrington argue that despite some disagreements among the bishops over churchmanship (in particular, between high churchmen and evangelicals) there was a fundamental unity among early Episcopal bishops rooted in the Anglican formularies (the Thirty-nine Articles, the Book of Common Prayer, The Books of Homilies and the Ordinal) and that they had a shared conception of their faith as part of the magisterial Reformed tradition but not necessarily Calvinist. This theological emphasis placed the bishops at odds with American frontier revivalism during the Second Great Awakening and also with Roman Catholicism in the era before the Tractarian movement gained influence within Anglicanism.

== Reception ==
According to Michael Lucchese in the Acton Institute's Religion & Liberty Online, Smith and Carrington's work demonstrates how the bishops they examined "endowed our regime with a certain conservative wisdom that sustained it through turbulent early years. The distinctly Anglican contribution to the life of the American Republic is a vision of ordered liberty we desperately must recover today." Lucchese said that That Blessed Liberty is beneficial to "churchmen of all denominations" by providing a clearer understanding of "what it means to be faithful in a distinctly republican context. This is a vital contribution to the history of American religion, and its authors deserve much praise for their pious efforts."

In The North American Anglican, James Clark praised Smith and Carrington for illuminating "the broad consensus of the early Protestant Episcopal Church", adding that "what this book adeptly illustrates is that such unity among American Anglicans was not simply possible, but for many years a reality, and therefore it is something we can reasonably aspire to ourselves. Here, as in many other respects, history lights our path forward, and Smith and Carrington have done good work in reacquainting us with this particular lantern." However, Clark commented that Smith and Carrington "never spell out" what beliefs are characteristic of their supposed tendency of Anglicanism toward "exoticism" and "anti-American traditionalism". "In short, it is not clear how, precisely, American-sourced Anglican identity ought to differ from or contrast with English-sourced Anglican identity, in the eyes of the authors," Clark wrote.
