= Pamela Cooper (disambiguation) =

Pamela Cooper may refer to:

- Pamela Cooper (1910–2006), British courtier, campaigner for refugees, and humanitarian
- Pamela Cooper, fictional character in The Inbetweeners
- Pamela Rebecca Cooper, fictional character in Dallas

== See also ==
- Pamela Cooper-White, theologian
