= Rape in the Hebrew Bible =

The Hebrew Bible contains a number of references to rape and other forms of sexual violence, both in the Law of Moses, its historical narratives and its prophetic poetry.

== History of scholarship ==
Until well into the 20th century, academic consensus did not view the Hebrew Bible as containing acts of rape, that is, sexual actions performed without the consent of a participant, apart from the rape of Tamar in 2 Samuel 13. Some narratives such as those of Samson and Delilah (Judges 16) and Shechem and Dinah (Genesis 34) were even interpreted to be love stories (e.g. about elopement) rather than rape stories. An example of a rare exception to this is a claim by Thomas Paine, who asserted in The Age of Reason (1795) that Numbers 31 portrayed Moses as ordering the Israelites to kill all Midianites except the virgin girls, whom they could keep for what Paine termed "debauchery": "Among the detestable villains that in any period of the world would have disgraced the name of man, it is impossible to find a greater than Moses, if this account be true. Here is an order to butcher the boys, to massacre the mothers, and debauch the daughters." In An Apology for the Bible (1796), Richard Watson, the Bishop of Llandaff, sought to refute Paine's arguments: "I see nothing in this proceeding, but good policy, combined with mercy. ... The women-children were not reserved for the purposes of debauchery, but of slavery." In any case, Paine was not so much focused on sexual violence in particular; this example was part of his general critique of Christian ethics. Johannes Pedersen's work Israel, Its Life and Culture (1926, 1940), commonly cited by scholars for information about Israelite sexual mores, never mentioned rape, only "forbidden degrees of relationship". Several Bible passages, which were later widely recognised as "rape texts", were referred to by Pedersen as "inappropriate marriage arrangements".

It was not until the late 1970s, with the emergence of the anti-rape movement due to second-wave feminism, that feminist scholars reached the consensus that some texts in the Hebrew Bible referred to rape, such as the Levite's concubine and the Benjamites seizing the virgins of Jabesh-Gilead and Shiloh as gang rapes (Judges 19–21). However, they also initially disagreed whether some narratives such as Dinah (Genesis 34) and Hagar depicted sexual violence or not. Some of the most notable works in this formative era in the study of biblical rape literature were:

- Phyllis Trible's Texts of Terror: literary-feminist readings of Biblical narratives (1984), the first feminist scholarly publication which posited that Hagar (Genesis 16; 21), Tamar (2 Samuel 13) and the Levite's concubine (Judges 19) were rape narratives.
- J. Cheryl Exum's Fragmented Women: Feminist (Sub)versions of Biblical Narratives (1993) on the wife-sister stories (Genesis 12; 20; 26), Dinah (Genesis 34), Samson and Delilah (Judges 16), the Levite's concubine (Judges 19), and Bathsheba and David (2 Samuel 11) as rape stories.
- Renita J. Weems' Battered Love: Marriage, Sex, and Violence in the Hebrew Prophets (1995) on sexual violence in marriage metaphors in Hosea, Jeremiah, and Ezekiel.
- Jonathan Kirsch's The Harlot by the Side of the Road: Forbidden Tales of the Bible (1997) on Lot's daughters (Genesis 19), Dinah (Genesis 34), and Tamar (2 Samuel 13) as three rape stories.

With regards to the Hebrew Bible's attitude to rape, particularly the sex laws in Deuteronomy chapters 20 to 22 with respect to the beautiful captive woman, two schools of thought have emerged. In one camp are scholars such as Richard Elliott Friedman and Shawna Dolansky, who concerning "Women's Status" in The Bible Now (2011) wrote: "What should not be in doubt is the biblical view of rape: it is horrid. It is decried in the Bible's stories. It is not tolerated in the Bible's laws." In the other camp are scholars such as Harold C. Washington, who in "'Lest he die in the battle and another man take her': Violence and the construction of gender in the laws of Deuteronomy 20–22" (1998) concluded: "The laws do not interdict sexual violence; rather they stipulate the terms under which a man may commit rape."

== Terminology ==
Scholars such as Susanne Scholz (2021) have pointed out that meanings of words in the Hebrew Bible are contextual, and Bible translators or commentators often misinterpret terms, miss important nuances, or use euphemisms for sexual violence. Even in modern English, the verb 'to rape' does not necessarily always refer to sexual violence, but could be used metaphorically to describe being subjected to a deeply unpleasant yet non-sexual experience. Similarly, a Hebrew verb such as עָנָה anah usually means 'to rape, to force/violate sexually', but in some non-sexual contexts is best translated as 'to oppress', 'to weaken', and so on. On the other hand, normally non-sexual words may sometimes describe something sexual; a verb such as עָשַׁק 'āšaq usually means 'to crush, to destroy, to oppress', but in one particular Bible verse (Isaiah 23:12) may actually mean 'to rape' in connection with the term 'virgin daughter', as the latter has a special sexual meaning. Biblical Hebrew is also full of euphemisms and sexual slang that may be difficult for modern readers to understand. 'To lie with', 'to know', 'to come to', and 'to uncover the nakedness of' are such examples which, in particular contexts, mean 'to have sex'. Such phrases do not necessarily imply that this sex is forced by one person upon another, and could actually describe consensual sex, but especially if the context of the narrative adds forms of coercion (such as violence and intimidation) upon someone, or claims that this serves as a 'punishment', then 'to rape' becomes a plausible translation. Likewise, nouns such as 'skirts', 'nakedness' and 'shame' may be euphemisms for 'women's genitals'.

=== Verbs that could mean 'to rape' or 'to have sex' ===
- עִנָה 'inâ = (explicit) to rape, to force [sexually], to defile, to violate, to ravish, to mistreat, to afflict, to humble/humiliate, to oppress, to subject/submit/subdue, to weaken; probably means 'to rape' in Judges 20:5 (Note: 'During the night the men of Gibeah came after me and surrounded the house, intending to kill me. They raped my concubine, and she died.' (Judges 20:5 NIV)) and 2 Samuel 13:14. (Note: 'But he refused to listen to her, and since he was stronger than she, he raped her.' (2 Samuel 13:14 NIV))
- עָשַׁק 'āšaq = to crush, to destroy, to oppress, (+ virgin) to rape? (Isaiah 23:12)
- בּוֹא bô' = to come (on) to, to come upon, (euphemism) to have sex with, to enter/insert, to bring, to go, to go down (the sun)
  - sometimes combined with אֵל el = in, into. Examples: 2 Samuel 16:21–22.
- גָּלָה gālâ = to uncover (nakedness), to strip (clothes), (implicit) to rape
- נָבֵל nāḇēl (pi'el) = (explicit) to sexually violate (e.g. in Genesis 34:7, Judges 19–21, 2 Samuel 13:12, and 3 Nahum 6), to make vile, to disgrace, to treat contemptuously, to make foolish
- פִּתָה piṯâ, = to entice, to seduce, to persuade, to deceive, to fool, to flatter? (Proverbs 20:19), to prevail? (Ezekiel 14:9), to (al)lure? (Hosea 2:14), (in pi'el (adds force)) to coax/force sexually? (Judges 14:15, Judges 16:5, Hosea 2:14)
  - sometimes combined with חָזַק ḥāzaq = to be strong(er), to become strong/powerful, to prevail/overpower, to seize/catch, to hold/retain, to strengthen/harden (oneself, someone else, or an object e.g. Pharaoh's heart in Exodus 4–14), to repair/fortify (a defensive structure, 2 Kings 12, 2 Chronicles 11;24;26, Nehemiah), to be courageous, to encourage/persuade. Scholars debate whether the combination of פָּתָה pātâ and חָזַק ḥāzaq, for example in Jeremiah 20:7, should be understood as rape or not.
- רָאָה rā'â = to see (exposed genitals), (implicit) to rape
- שָׁגַל šāgal = (vulgar) to ravish, to rape, to violate, (euphemistic translation) to lie with (Deuteronomy 28:30, Isaiah 13:16, Jeremiah 3:2, Zechariah 14:2)
- שָׁכַב šāḵaḇ = to lie (down), to sleep, (euphemism) to lie/sleep with, (+ force) to rape.
- סוּר sur = to remove/strip (clothes or other objects), to take/put away, to behead/decapitate, to separate, to turn aside (or: to decline), to withdraw/retract, to depart/leave
- טָמֵא ṭāmê' = (passive) to become unclean, to be pronounced unclean, (active, passive or reflexive) to defile (someone, oneself) / to be defiled, (implicit) to have illicit sex with someone / to be subjected to illicit sex by someone (by seduction or rape)
- תָּפַשׂ tāp̄aś = to take, to catch, to capture, to grab/grasp, to seize, to lay hold, to arrest, to occupy, to profane, to handle/wield/play (an object)
- צָחַק ṣāḥaq = (positive) to laugh, to jest/mock, to sport, to caress / make love / have sex (Genesis 26:8), to play
- יָדַע yāda' = to know, (euphemism) to have sex(ual relations) with, (euphemism) (+ force) to rape
  - sometimes combined with מִשְׁכָּב miškāḇ ("bed", colloquially "lying (down)") = (literally) to know in bed, (older Bible translations) to know intimately/carnally / to know by lying with, (modern Bible translations) to have sex(ual relations) with (e.g. Numbers 31:18, where the phrase 'women children who have not known a man in bed' is sometimes translated simply as 'virgin girls')
- זָנָה zānâ = (pejorative) to act as a harlot/whore, to play a/the harlot/whore, to go a whoring, to commit fornication, to commit whoredom, to be unfaithful/adulterous

=== Nouns for genitals ===
- בָּ֫טֶן bāṭen = womb, abdomen
- עֶרְוָה 'erwâ = nakedness, bare flesh, genitals
- חֶרְפָּה ḥerpâ = shame, vagina
- מַ֫עַר ma'ar = nakedness, genitals
- פּוֹת pōṯ = (only in Isaiah 3:17, vulgar) cunt, (euphemistic translation) private parts, (fore)head/scalp, (only in 1 Kings 7:50) door socket
- שֹׁ֛בֶל šōḇel = skirt (also euphemism for women's genitals)

=== Nouns for humiliation ===
- נְבָלָה nəḇālâ = rape, disgraceful act/thing, folly, villainy, foolishness
- קָלוֹן qālôn = disgrace, dishonour, shame (also euphemism for women's genitals)
- רֹ֫אּי ro'î = (pejorative) gazingstock, spectacle, appearance

== Examples ==
=== Genesis ===
==== Genesis 9 ====
In Genesis 9:22, just after the Genesis flood narrative, it is written that Ham, a son of Noah, "saw" his father's "nakedness", a phrase which elsewhere in the Hebrew Bible can mean "had sex with". Some interpretations conclude that Ham had sex with Noah, perhaps even "sodomised" him in his sleep. The same explanations are found in three Greek translations of the Bible, which replace the word "see" in verse 22 with another word denoting homosexual relations. Because of what happened, Noah put a curse on Ham's son Canaan and his descendents, the Canaanites.

==== Genesis 16 ====
Phyllis Trible (1984) was the first scholar to suggest that the story of Hagar in Genesis 16:1–4 was a rape narrative, a conclusion later supported by some feminist biblical researchers such as J. Cheryl Exum and Suzanne Scholz, but rejected by others. Some have even considered the possibility that verse 16:6 is saying that Sarah "raped" Hagar as well, since the verb used, עִנָה inah in the pi'el, is sometimes used elsewhere in the Hebrew Bible to mean "to rape", "to mistreat" or "to oppress" (amongst other things), depending on the context. Trible rejected that idea, reasoning that it simply meant 'oppression'; womanist theologian Delores S. Williams (1993) accepted it as the sexual violation of her physical integrity; Scholz concluded that "the story does not provide a clear answer".

==== Genesis 19 ====
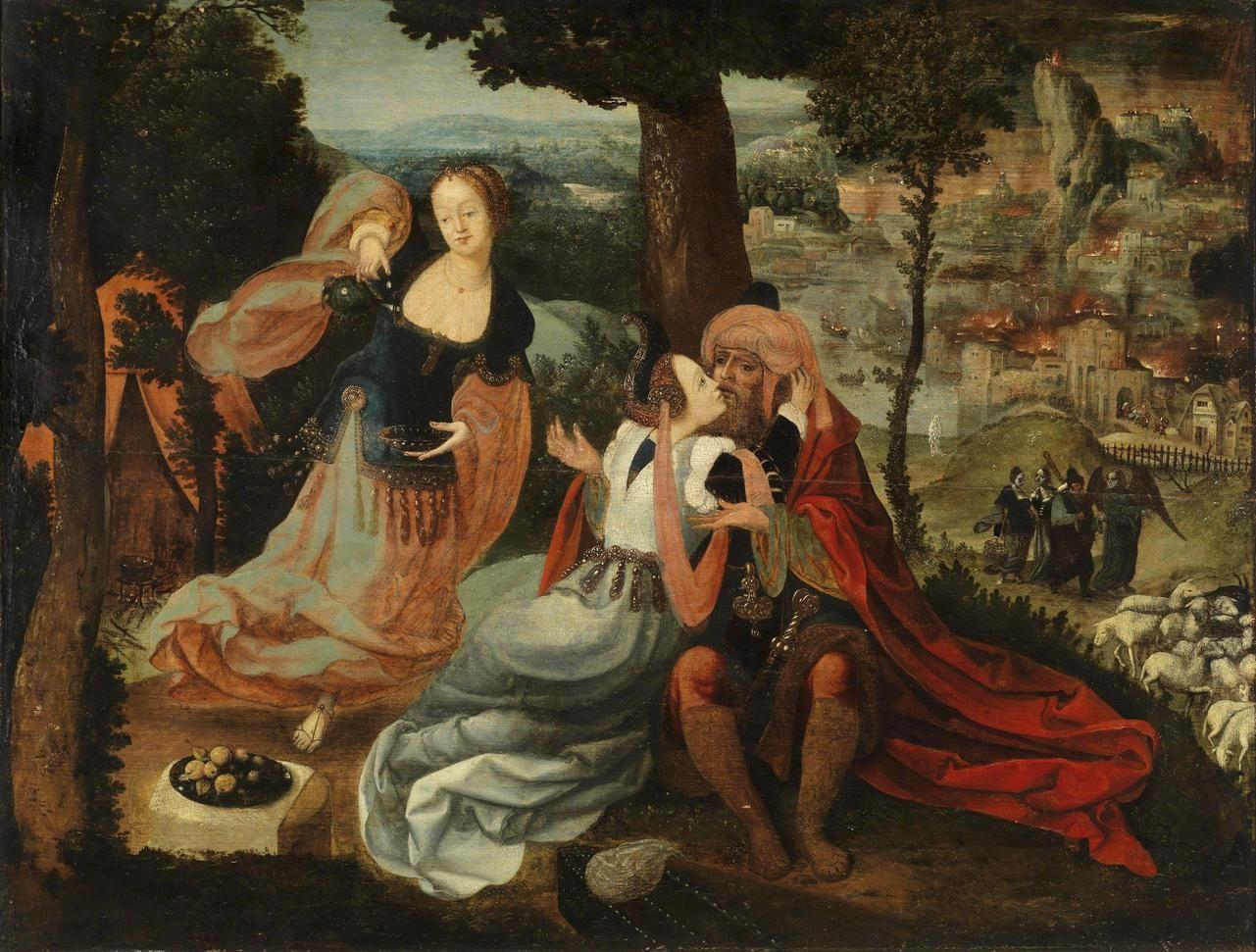
Jan Wellens de Cock, Lot and his daughters

Genesis 19 features an attempted gang rape. Two angels arrive in Sodom, and Lot shows them hospitality. However, the men of the city gathered around Lot's house and demanded that he give them the two guests so that they could rape them. In response to this, Lot offers the mob his two virgin daughters instead. The mob refuses Lot's offer, but the angels strike them with blindness, God eventually destroys the city, and Lot and his family escape.

Genesis 19 goes on to relate how Lot's daughters get him drunk and have sex with him. As a result, the eponymous ancestors of Moab and Ammon, recurring enemies of Israel, were born. A number of commentators describe their actions as rape. Esther Fuchs (2003) suggests that the text presents Lot's daughters as the "initiators and perpetrators of the incestuous 'rape'."

Gerda Lerner (1986) has suggested that because the Hebrew Bible takes for granted Lot's right to offer his daughters for rape, we can assume that it reflected a historical reality of a father's power over them.

==== Genesis 34 ====
In Genesis 34, Shechem had sex with Dinah, but how this text is to be exactly translated and understood is the subject of scholarly controversy. Most modern scholars claim that it describes rape, and many modern translations render it as 'raped' (or with similar verbiage of sexual forcing), while some earlier commentators also proposed elopement.

Genesis 34:2–3
| Leningrad Codex (1008) | King James Version (1611) | New International Version (1978) | Susanne Scholz (2014) |
|---|---|---|---|
| וַיַּ֨רְא אֹתָ֜הּ שְׁכֶ֧ם בֶּן־חֲמֹ֛ור הַֽחִוִּ֖י נְשִׂ֣יא הָאָ֑רֶץ וַיִּקַּ֥ח אֹתָ֛הּ וַיִּשְׁכַּ֥ב אֹתָ֖הּ וַיְעַנֶּֽהָ׃ | And when Shechem the son of Hamor the Hivite prince of the country saw her he took her and lay with her and defiled her. | When Shechem son of Hamor the Hivite, the ruler of that area, saw her, he took her and raped her. | When Shechem son of Hamor the Hivite, prince of the region, saw her, he took her, and he laid her, and he raped her. |
| וַתִּדְבַּ֣ק נַפְשֹׁ֔ו בְּדִינָ֖ה בַּֽת־יַעֲקֹ֑ב וַיֶּֽאֱהַב֙ אֶת־הַֽנַּעֲרָ֔ וַיְדַבֵּ֖ר עַל־לֵ֥ב הַֽנַּעֲרָֽ׃ | And his soul clave unto Dinah the daughter of Jacob, and he loved the damsel, and spake kindly unto the damsel. | His heart was drawn to Dinah daughter of Jacob; he loved the young woman and spoke tenderly to her. | And he stayed with/kept Dinah, the daughter of Jacob, and he lusted after the young woman, and he tried to quiet the young woman. |

===== Linguistic analysis =====
Mary Anna Bader (2006) notes the division between verses 2 and 3, and writes that "It is strange and upsetting for the modern reader to find the verbs 'love' and 'dishonor' together, having the same man as their subject and the same woman as their object." Later, she writes that "The narrator gives the reader no information about Dinah's thoughts or feelings or her reactions to what has taken place. Shechem is not only the focalizor but also the primary actor ... The narrator leaves no room for doubt that Shechem is the center of these verses. Dinah is the object (or indirect object) of Shechem's actions and desires." Frank M. Yamada (2008) argues that the abrupt transition between Genesis 34:2 and 34:3 was a storytelling technique due to the fact that the narrative focused on the men, a pattern which he perceives in other rape narratives as well, also arguing that the men's responses are depicted in a mixed light. "The rape of Dinah is narrated in a way that suggests there are social forces at work, which complicate the initial seal violation and will make problematic the resulting male responses. ... The abrupt transition from rape to marriage, however, creates a tension in the reader's mind ... the unresolved issue of punishment anticipates the response of Simeon and Levi."

Contrary to Bader and Yamada, however, Scholz (2021) asserted that, despite being a passive object, Dinah rather than Shechem is central in the narrative, and the verbs in verse 3 are widely mistranslated. דָּבַק dabaq, frequently translated as 'to love (someone)', is never translated like that elsewhere in the Hebrew Bible, but as 'to cling to (someone)' (Ruth 1:14 NRSV), 'to keep close to (someone)' (Ruth 2:23 NRSV), 'to remain close to (someone)' (Psalm 101:3 A. A. Anderson), 'to retain (the inheritance)' (Numbers 36:7,9 NRSV), or 'to keep something (possession)' according to Wilhelm Gesenius. Scholz concluded: "'to love' is entirely inadequate. A better translation emphasizes spatial closeness: 'Shechem stayed with Dinah' or 'Shechem kept Dinah', in the sense of not allowing her to leave." In the given context, the middle verb אָהַב aheb is better translated as 'to lust after (someone)' or 'to desire (someone)' rather than 'to love (someone)', as this feeling is sexual rather than romantic and entirely one-sided from a controlling subject to a sexually forced object. The third verb is part of a phrase, וַיְדַבֵּ֖ר עַל־לֵ֥ב הַֽנַּעֲרָֽ׃ way-ḏab-bêr 'al-lêḇ han-na-'ă-rā, literally meaning "and he spoke to the young woman's heart". While many translations render this as "he spoke tenderly to her" (NRSV), Scholz followed Georg Fischer (1984), who noted the same phrase in the Hebrew Bible always appears when "the situation is wrong, difficult, or danger is in the air", (Note: Namely, in Genesis 34:3; 50:21; Judges 19:3; 1 Samuel 1:13; 2 Samuel 19:8; Isaiah 40:2; Hosea 2:16; Ruth 2;13; and 2 Chronicles 30:22; 32:6, according to Georg Fischer (1984).) and should be understood as "to try to talk against a negative opinion" or "to change a person's mind". Therefore, Scholz argued that Shechem tried to calm down Dinah after the rape and to change her negative opinion by talking to her, and rendered the last part of verse 3 as "He tried to quiet down the young woman."

===== Historical-ethical analysis =====
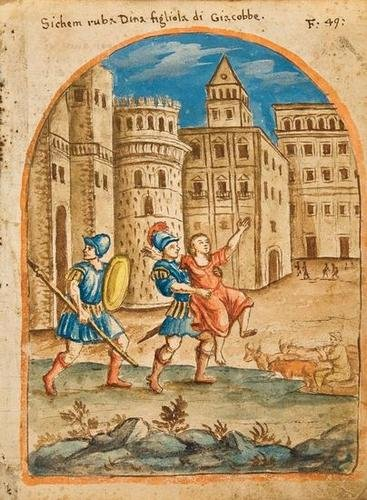
Shechem seizes Dinah. Italian artist, 17th century.

Shechem's rape of Dinah in Genesis 34 is described in the text itself as "a thing that should not be done." Susanne Scholz (2000) writes that "The brothers' revenge, however, also demonstrates their conflicting views about women. On the one hand they defend their sister. On the other hand they do not hesitate to capture other women as if these women were their booty. The connection of the rape and the resulting revenge clarifies that no easy solutions are available to stop rapists and rape-prone behavior. In this regard Genesis 34 invites contemporary readers to address the prevalence of rape through the metaphoric language of a story." In a different work, Scholz (2010) writes that "During its extensive history of interpretation, Jewish and Christian interpreters mainly ignored Dinah. ... in many interpretations, the fraternal killing is the criminal moment, and in more recent years scholars have argued explicitly against the possibility that Shechem rapes Dinah. They maintain that Shechem's love and marriage proposal do not match the "scientifically documented behavior of a rapist". Scholz (2000) argued that Dinah's silence does not mean she consented: "The literary analysis showed, however, that despite this silence Dinah is present throughout the story. Indeed, everything happens because of her. Informed by feminist scholarship, the reading does not even require her explicit comments."

Rabbi and scholar Burton Visotzky (2010) stated that the story describes a marry-your-rapist rule:

It was a society in which the victim's shame had to be accounted for, and marriage did erase the shame attendant upon the loss of virginity. But this is shame of an empathically male construction and stunningly lacking in sympathy for the woman victim. There is little face to be gained from the dubious honor of marrying your rapist. At least Dinah's brothers agree with this last point, if not with how I arrived there. ... I do not believe rape was an issue for them. Shame and control were their buttons. Rape is one of ours.

Sandra E. Rapoport (2011) argues that "The Bible text is sympathetic to Shechem in the verses following his rape of Dinah, at the same time that it does not flinch from condemning the lawless predatory behavior towards her. One midrash even attributes Shechem's three languages of love in verse 3 to God's love for the Children of Israel." She also put forth that "Shechem's character is complex. He is not easily characterized as unqualifiedly evil. It is this complexity that creates unbearable tension for the reader and raises the justifiably strong emotions of outrage, anger, and possible compassion." Therefore, Rapoport regards Genesis 34 as condemning rape strongly, writing, "The brothers' revenge killings of Shechem and Hamor, while they might remind modern readers of frontier justice and vigilantism, are an understandable measure-for-measure act in the context of the ancient Near East."

==== Genesis 39 ====
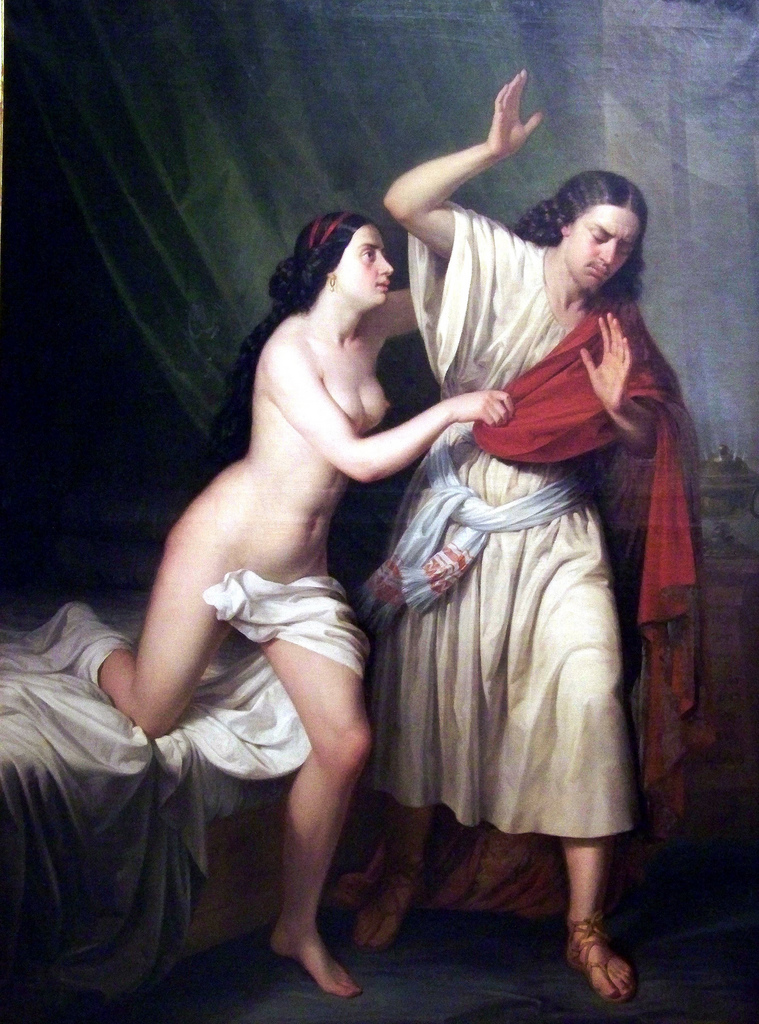
José y la mujer de Putifar, oil on canvas by Esquivel (1854)

A rare Biblical instance of sexual harassment and assault perpetrated against a man by a woman may be found in Genesis 39. In this chapter, the enslaved Joseph is repeatedly propositioned by the wife of his master Potiphar. Joseph refuses to have sex with her ("although she spoke to Joseph day after day, he would not consent" (Genesis. 39:10)), as he has no marital right to do so and it would be a sin against Yahweh (Genesis 39:6–10). Potiphar's wife eventually demands that he come to bed with her and grabs at his clothing (Genesis 39:12). Joseph escapes, leaving the article of clothing with her (different translations describe the article of clothing as, for example, Joseph's "garment", "robe", "coat", or even simply "clothes"). Potiphar's wife then tells first her servants, and then her husband, that Joseph had attacked her (Genesis 39:13–18). Joseph is sent to prison (Genesis 39:19–20), where he remains until his God-given ability to interpret dreams leads the Pharaoh to ask for his help (Genesis 41:14).

Scholars such as Meir Sternberg (1985) characterise the woman's repetitive behaviour towards Joseph as sexual assault. Feminist scholar, Judith McKinlay (1995), noted that Potiphar's wife is treated as an object in his master's possession (Gen 39:8–9), and the reason Joseph refuses is not because he does not want to have sex with her, but because it would violate his master's trust and be a sin against Yahweh. It could be argued that the woman is trying to assert herself as a subject who makes her own choices instead of remaining an object owned by her husband, and invites Joseph to join her in this action which the narrative frames as a 'sin'. Simultaneously, however, she abuses her position of power as the slave master's wife to proposition Joseph, and to punish him for refusal. Susan Tower Hollis (1989) suggests that the narrative of Potiphar's wife 'is in line with certain ancient folk-tales, where a "woman makes vain overtures to a man and then accuses him of attempting to force her", with the man "unjustly punished for his alleged attempt to seduce the woman."

Reformed theologian, Tremper Longman III, refers to the Ten Commandments for the reason behind Joseph's rejection of the advances from Potiphar's wife: "Adultery would also be sin against God. Adultery did not become sinful with the publication of the Ten Commandments (Exod 20:14; Deut 5:18). The Ten Commandments simply formalize God's will for his people at the point when the people of God become a nation state." In his chapter on Genesis 2 (named "The Nature of Marriage and the Gift of Sex"), Longman writes that "sex is God's gift to married couples"; Joseph's actions therefore demonstrated respect for Potiphar's marriage, although they were ultimately motivated by obedience to the creator God, Yahweh.

Joseph's experience – harassment / assault, false accusations and imprisonment before eventually being released, promoted and honoured – is commonly seen as a 'type' of Christ (see Typology (theology)) and, for Longman III, it demonstrates the major theme of (the rest of) Joseph's story: "God can bring salvation even using evil acts of those who want to harm God's people".

=== Numbers 31 ===
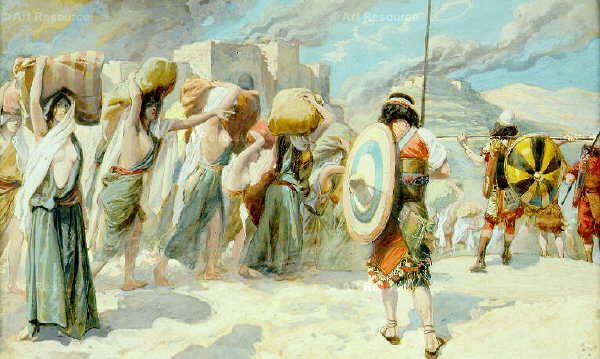
The Women of Midian Led Captive by the Hebrews, James Tissot c. 1900 Midianite women, children and livestock taken captive by Israelite soldiers after all Midianite men had been killed and their towns burnt.

Moses, Eleazar the priest and all the leaders of the community went to meet them outside the camp. Moses was angry with the officers of the army—the commanders of thousands and commanders of hundreds—who returned from the battle. "Have you allowed all the women to live?" he asked them. "They were the ones who followed Balaam's advice and enticed the Israelites to be unfaithful to [Yahweh] in the Peor incident, so that a plague struck [Yahweh]'s people. Now kill all the boys. And kill every woman who has slept with a man, but save for yourselves every girl who has never slept with a man."

— Numbers 31:13–18 (NIV)

This has been interpreted as a passage making rape "a normative practice in war". Rabbi and scholar Shaye J. D. Cohen (1999) argued that "the implications of Numbers 31:17–18 are unambiguous ... we may be sure that for yourselves means that the warriors may 'use' their virgin captives sexually", adding that Shimon bar Yochai understood the passage 'correctly'. On the other hand, he noted that other rabbinical commentaries such as B. and Y. Qiddushin and Yevamot claimed "that for yourselves meant 'as servants'. Later apologists, both Jewish and Christian, adopted the latter interpretation." In addition, the Israelite soldiers were immediately commanded to purify themselves and their spoils, including the captives, in Numbers 31:19 so they could be reminded of how "disruptive" death was.

=== Deuteronomy ===
==== Deuteronomy 20 ====
Deuteronomy 20:14 indicates that all women and child captives become enslaved property:

As for the women, the children, the livestock and everything else in the city, you may take these as plunder for yourselves. And you may use the plunder [Yahweh] your God gives you from your enemies.

— Deuteronomy 20:14 (NIV)

In their human rights study of wartime sexual violence, Kennedy‐Pipe & Stanley (2000) referred to Deuteronomy 20:14 when stating: "The advocacy of rape in war was prevalent throughout ancient Near East history and is evident in the Hebrew Bible: women are frequently depicted as mere objects of male possession and control. Biblical references clearly illustrate this point in relation to the treatment of women in wartime, where they were regarded as 'spoils of war'."

==== Deuteronomy 21 ====
Deuteronomy 21:10–14 states:

When you go to war against your enemies and [Yahweh] your God delivers them into your hands and you take captives, if you notice among the captives a beautiful woman and are attracted to her, you may take her as your wife. Bring her into your home and have her shave her head, trim her nails and put aside the clothes she was wearing when captured. After she has lived in your house and mourned her father and mother for a full month, then you may go to her and be her husband and she shall be your wife. If you are not pleased with her, let her go wherever she wishes. You must not sell her or treat her as a slave, since you have dishonored her.

— Deuteronomy 21:10–14 (NIV)

This passage is grouped with laws concerning sons and inheritance, suggesting that the passage's main concern is with the regulation of marriage in such a way as to transform the woman taken captive in war into an acceptable Israelite wife, in order to beget legitimate Israelite children. Caryn Reeder (2017) notes, "The month-long delay before the finalization of the marriage would thus act in part as a primitive pregnancy test."

The idea that the captive woman will be raped is, according to Reeder, supported by the fact that in passages like Isaiah 13:16 and Zechariah 14:2, sieges lead to women being "ravished". M. I. Rey (2016) notes that the passage "conveniently provides a divorce clause to dispose of her (when she is no longer sexually gratifying) without providing her food or shelter or returning her to her family ... In this way, the foreign captive is divorced not for objectionable actions like other (Israelite/Hebrew) wives but for reasons beyond her control."

David Resnick (2004) praises the passage for its nobility, calling it "evidently the first legislation in human history to protect women prisoners of war" and "the best of universalist Biblical humanism as it seeks to manage a worst case scenario: controlling how a conquering male must act towards a desired, conquered, female other." He argues that after the defeat of her nation in war, marrying the victors "may be the best way for a woman to advance her own interests in a calamitous political and social situation." According to Kawashima (2011), by treating her as a wife, rather than as a slave, the law seeks to compensate for the soldier's having "violated her" by his failure to procure her father's approval, which was precluded by the state of war.

==== Deuteronomy 22 ====
Scholz (2021) stated that the texts of Deuteronomy 22:25–29 "are widely recognized as rape legislation", while Deuteronomy 22:22–24 as well as Deuteronomy 21:10–14 "are more contested and are not usually characterized as rape laws". The NIV renders them as follows:

22. If a man is found sleeping with another man's wife, both the man who slept with her and the woman must die. You must purge the evil from Israel.
23. If a man happens to meet in a town a virgin pledged to be married and he sleeps with her,
24. you shall take both of them to the gate of that town and stone them to death—the young woman because she was in a town and did not scream for help, and the man because he violated another man's wife. You must purge the evil from among you.
25. But if out in the country a man happens to meet a young woman pledged to be married and rapes her, only the man who has done this shall die.
26. Do nothing to the woman; she has committed no sin deserving death. This case is like that of someone who attacks and murders a neighbor,
27. for the man found the young woman out in the country, and though the betrothed woman screamed, there was no one to rescue her.
28. If a man happens to meet a virgin who is not pledged to be married and rapes her and they are discovered,
29. he shall pay her father fifty shekels of silver. He must marry the young woman, for he has violated her. He can never divorce her as long as he lives.

— Deuteronomy 22:22–29 (NIV)

Cheryl Anderson, in her book Ancient Laws and Contemporary Controversies: The Need for Inclusive Bible Interpretation (2009), said that:

Clearly, these laws do not take into account the female's perspective. After a rape, [the victim] would undoubtedly see herself as the injured party and would probably find marriage to her rapist to be distasteful, to say the least. Arguably, there are cultural and historical reasons why such a law made sense at the time. ... Just the same, the law communicates the message that faith tradition does not (and should not) consider the possibility that women might have different yet valid perspectives.

Verse 22:22 does not specifically address the wife's complicity, and therefore Adele Berlin's interpretation (2008) is that even if she was raped, the law dictates she must be put to death since she has been defiled by the extramarital encounter. However, according to the Cambridge Bible for Schools and Colleges (1882–1925), the crime committed was consensual adultery, and therefore both parties were guilty.

Yamada opined that Deuteronomy 22:23–24, which commands punishment for the engaged virgin woman if the act takes place in the city, was not about rape, but adultery, because the engaged woman was already considered to be the reserved property of her future husband. He also argued that the Deuteronomic laws treat women as the property of men, and that "the Deuteronomic laws ... do not address the crime of rape as sexual violence against a woman as such", but as an economic crime against her father or (future) husband. Because it was the father's prerogative to marry his daughter off to a man of his choice, payment of a dowry of fifty shekels of silver to the deflowered woman's father is mentioned in Deuteronomy 22:28–29 as a restitution for her unplanned loss of virginity. Yamada pointed out that there was no death penalty for either party in this latter scenario, but a marry-your-rapist provision, which he compared to Shechem's offer of marriage including a bride price after raping Dinah in Genesis 34:12.

Regarding 22:25–27, Craig S. Keener (1996) considered it a rape scenario, comparing it to the Laws of Eshnunna §26. (Note: Laws of Eshnunna §26: "If a man gives bride-money for a(nother) man's daughter, but another man seizes her forcibly without asking permission of her father and her mother and deprives her of her virginity, it is a capital offence and he shall die.") He noted that "if no one else was present as a witness of her innocence but she was clearly violated, biblical law assumes [the woman's] innocence without requiring witnesses (22:27); she does not bear the burden of proof to argue that she did not consent. ... If the couple definitely had intercourse, the man was guilty either way, but if the woman might have been innocent, her innocence must be assumed." Davidson (2011) added, "Thus the Mosaic law protects the sexual purity of a betrothed woman (and protects the one to whom she is betrothed), and prescribing the severest penalty to the man who dares to sexually violate her."

Robert S. Kawashima noted (2011) that regardless of whether the rape of a girl occurs in the country or the city, these verses imply that she "can be guilty of a crime, but not, technically speaking, a victim of a crime, for which reason her noncomplicity does not add to the perpetrator's guilt."

===== Verses 28 and 29 =====
Deuteronomy 22:28–29 has been a rather controversial part of this chapter, with some modern scholars arguing that it is a marry-your-rapist law. Bible translations interpret the passage differently, with many modern editions translating the term שָׁכַב šākab as "to rape", where older translations usually preferred "to lie with". Similarly, most modern translations render תָּפַשׂ tāphaś as "to seize", whereas older translations generally preferred "to lay hold on". Finally, עָנָה anah/inah is almost universally translated as "to humble" in older English translations, but almost always as "to violate" in modern translations. The Good News Translation even rendered the passage as "he forced her to have intercourse with him", and God's Word Translation made it "he raped her". Irrespective of whether or not the woman had given consent to the sexual act, or will give consent to marriage, the man is required to marry her by paying her parents a dowry to settle the matter.

Theologian John Gill (1746–63) observed that a different verb is used in 22:28 (תָּפַשׂ tāphaś) than in 22:25 (חָזַק ḥāzaq, chazaq) for "to lay hold on". He thought the former was more 'enticing' and 'loving' (comparing it to Exodus 22:16, which he deemed consensual) and the latter more 'forceful' and 'violent'; he concluded that verse 25 described rape and verse 28 consensual sex. Similarly, theologian Charles Ellicott (1897) interpreted Deuteronomy 22:28–29 as a law concerning the offense of premarital intercourse through 'seduction', also comparing it to Exodus 22:16–17 which mentions that the woman's father can turn down this offer of marriage. However, even though almost all scholars agree that Exodus 22:16–17 describes a consensual situation, it does not specify that the man "violated" the woman, whereas Deuteronomy 22:29 does. The Hebrew word used here for "violated" is עָנָה anah or inah, which (depending on the context) can mean "to rape, to force [sexually], to defile, to violate, to ravish, to mistreat, to afflict, to humble/humiliate, to oppress, to subject/submit/subdue, to weaken". Especially when a Hebrew verb is in the pi'el (intensifying) form, this adds force, and in Deuteronomy 22:29 עִנָּ֔הּ 'in-nāh is in the pi'el. In several other cases in the Hebrew Bible where this word is used to describe a man and a woman interacting, for example Judges 20:5 and 2 Samuel 13:14, it is usually describing a man forcing a woman to have sex against her will (that is, rape).

Richard M. Davidson (2011) regarded Deuteronomy 22:28–29 as a law concerning statutory rape. He argued that the laws do support the role of women in the situation, writing, "even though the woman apparently consents to engage in sexual intercourse with the man in these situations, the man nonetheless has 'afflicted/humbled/violated her'. The Edenic divine design that a woman's purity be respected and protected has been violated. ... Even though the woman may have acquiesced to her seducer, nonetheless according to the law, the dowry is 'equal to the bride wealth for virgins' (Exodus 22:16): she is treated financially as a virgin would be! Such treatment upholds the value of a woman against a man taking unfair advantage of her, and at the same time discourages sexual abuse." Valerie Tarico (2015) was critical of Deuteronomy 22:28–29, saying that "The punishments for rape have to do not with compassion or trauma to the woman herself but with honor, tribal purity, and a sense that a used woman is damaged goods."

==== Deuteronomy 28 ====
Deuteronomy 28:15–64 contains "curses for disobedience"; things that will happen, according to verse 15, "if you do not obey Yahweh your God and do not carefully follow all his commands and decrees I am giving you today, all these curses will come on you and overtake you." In particular, Deuteronomy 28:30 states: "You will be pledged to be married to a woman, but another will take her and rape her. You will build a house, but you will not live in it. You will plant a vineyard, but you will not even begin to enjoy its fruit." (New International Version). The word used is יִשְׁכָּבֶ֔נָּה yiškāḇennāh, derived from the verb שָׁכַב šāgal, meaning 'to ravish, to rape, to violate', or euphemistically translated 'to lie with'. Some scholars think that Esarhaddon's Succession Treaty (written around 675 BCE) served as a literary model for these curses in Deuteronomy 28, as well as content in Deuteronomy 13, due to strong textual similarities. Steymans (2013) concluded that this text was therefore probably written between the death of Esarhaddon in 672 BCE and the probable adoption of the Book of Deuteronomy by king Josiah in 622 BCE. Deuteronomy 28:30 corresponds to Esarhaddon's Succession Treaty (SAA 2 6) 11.425-426 (§41), in which the accursed man's fiancée would also be raped, and his house and vineyard would also be lost.

=== Judges ===
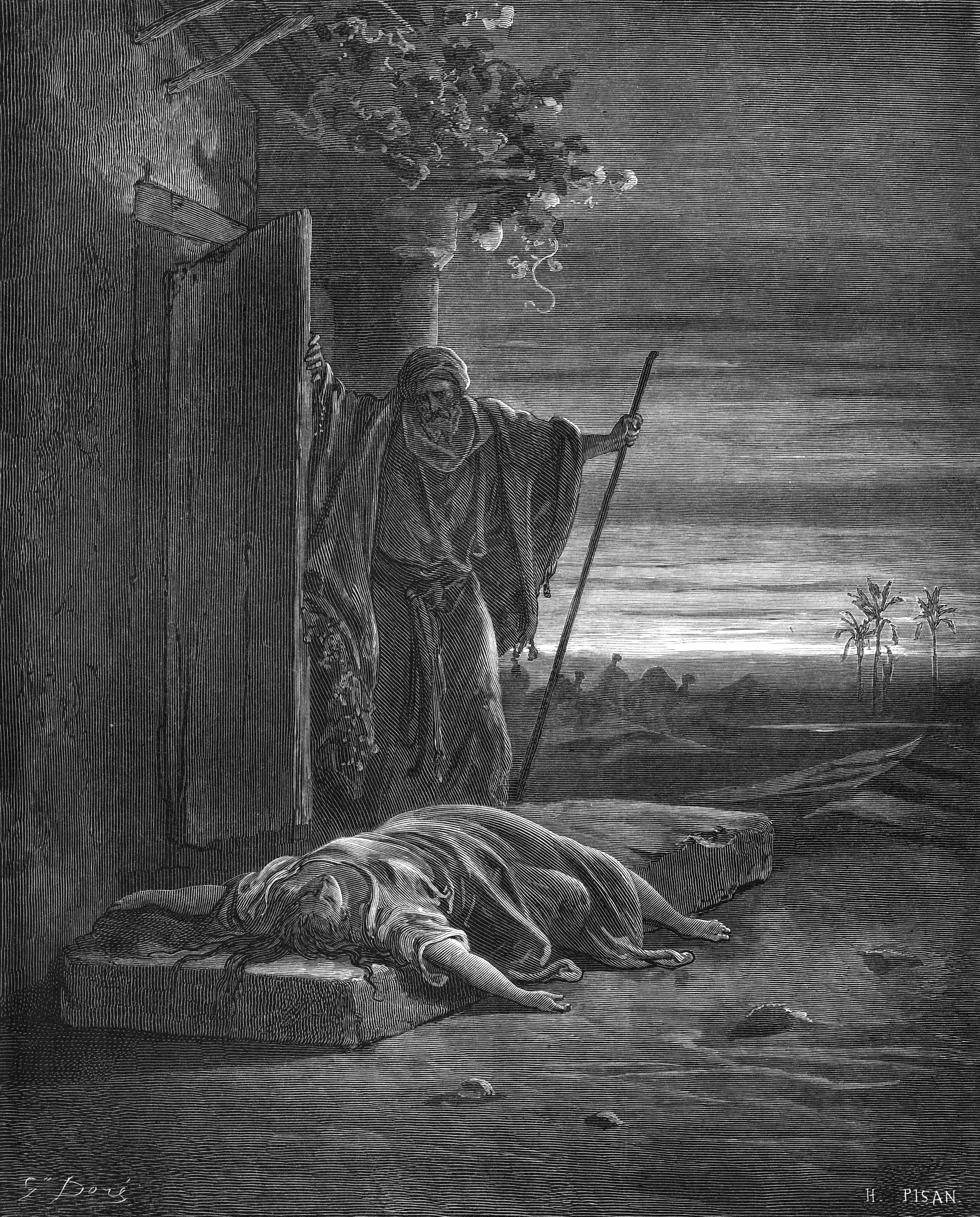
The Levite finds his gang-raped concubine dead on his doorstep. Art by Gustave Doré (1880).

Trible devotes a chapter in Texts of Terror to the rape of the concubine in the Book of Judges, titled "An Unnamed Woman: The Extravagance of Violence". About the rape of the concubine itself, she wrote, "The crime itself receives few words. If the storyteller advocates neither pornography or sensationalism, he also cares little about the women's fate. The brevity of this section on female rape contrasts sharply with the lengthy reports on male carousing and male deliberations that precede it. Such elaborate attention to men intensifies the terror perpetrated upon the woman." After noting that differences in the Greek and Hebrew versions of the Bible make it unclear whether or not the concubine was dead the following morning ("the narrator protects his protagonist through ambiguity"), Trible writes that "Neither the other characters nor the narrator recognizes her humanity. She is property, object, tool, and literary device. ... In the end, she is no more than the oxen that Saul will later cut in pieces and send throughout all the territory of Israel as a call to war."

Scholz notes the linguistic ambiguity of the passage and the variety of interpretations that stem from it. She wrote that:

since this narrative is not a 'historical' or 'accurate' report about actual events, the answers to these questions reveal more about a reader's assumptions regarding gender, androcentrism, and sociopolitical practices than can be known about ancient Israelite life based on Judges 19. ... Predictably, interpreters deal differently with the meaning of the story, depending on their hermeneutical interests.

Yamada believes that the language used to describe the plight of the concubine make the reader sympathize with her, especially during the rape and its aftermath. "Thus, the narrator's elaborate description of the woman's attempt to return to the old man's house highlights for the reader the devastating effects of the preceding night's events, emphasizing her desolate state. The woman's raped and exhausted body becomes a symbol of the wrong that is committed when 'every man did what was right in his own eyes'. The image of this woman struggling to the door demands a response from the participants in the story."

=== 2 Samuel ===
==== 2 Samuel 11 ====
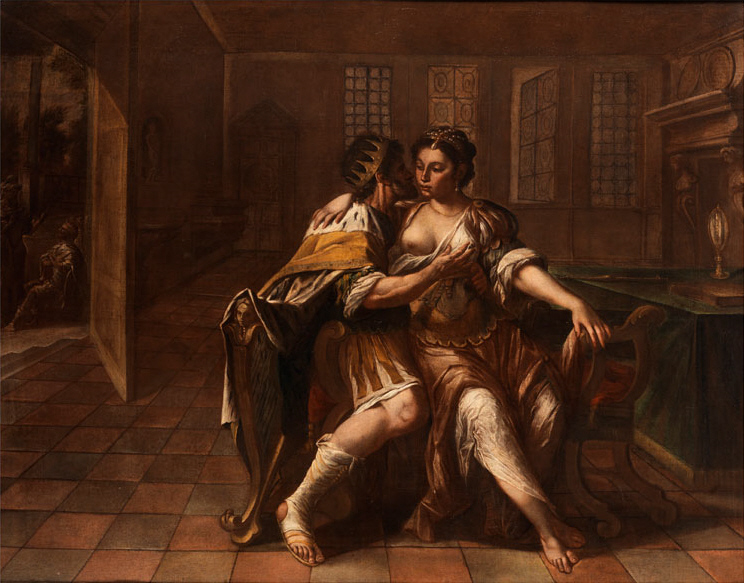
David and Bathsheba. Anonymous 17th-century painting.

Some scholars see the episode of David's adultery with Bathsheba in 2 Samuel 11 as an account of a rape. David and Diana Garland suggest that:

Since consent was impossible, given her powerless position, David in essence raped her. Rape means to have sex against the will, without the consent, of another – and she did not have the power to consent. Even if there was no physical struggle, even if she gave in to him, it was rape.

Other scholars, however, suggest that Bathsheba came to David willingly. James B. Jordan notes that the text does not describe Bathsheba's protest, as it does Tamar's in 2 Samuel 13, and argues that this silence indicates that "Bathsheba willingly cooperated with David in adultery". George Nicol goes even further and suggests that "Bathsheba's action of bathing in such close proximity to the royal palace was deliberately provocative".

==== 2 Samuel 12 and 16 ====
Yahweh is displeased with the fact that David has arranged for Bathsheba's husband Uriah the Hittite to be killed in battle, and that David has taken Bathsheba as his wife (2 Samuel 11:26–27). He sends Nathan the prophet to inform David that he will receive divine punishment for taking away / seizing (לָקַח laqach) Uriah's wife as his own wife (2 Samuel 12:9). Not only would Yahweh strike the newborn child of Bathsheba and David with illness so that it died after seven days (2 Samuel 12:13–18), but Yahweh says that he would let someone close (רֵעַ rea) to David take away / seize (לָקַח laqach) all his wives and have him sleep with / rape (שָׁכַב šākab) them in broad daylight (literally "in the eyes of the sun") for everyone in Israel to see (2 Samuel 12:9–12).

In 2 Samuel 16:20–23, this man close to David turns out to be his son Absalom, who is rebelling against his father and seeking to seize the kingship for himself. His advisor Ahithophel tells Absalom: "'Sleep with (בּוֹא bô + אֵל el, literally "come/go (in)to") your father's concubines whom he left to take care of the palace. Then all Israel will hear that you have made yourself obnoxious to your father, and the hands of everyone with you will be more resolute.' So they pitched a tent for Absalom on the roof, and he slept with (בּוֹא bô + אֵל el) his father's concubines in the sight of all Israel." (2 Samuel 16:21–22 NIV). Scholz (2021) pointed out that interpreters such as McCarter and Anderson did not view Absalom's acts with David's concubines as rape, but that he 'illegally claimed' or 'royally married' them. On the other hand, Ken Stone (1994) entertained the possibility of rape, as "there is no reason to think that these women would have been willing participants." Thomas Bohache (2006) went even further, stating:

One can quite plausibly conclude that what we have in 2 Samuel 16 is a representation of rape, which is understood within the logic of the narrative of 2 Samuel as having been initiated by God. When considered from that point of view, the story in 2 Samuel 16 is arguably one of the most disturbing texts in the Bible and needs to be evaluated critically on the basis of the fact that it incorporates (as does much of 1 and 2 Samuel) obviously patriarchal notions about the sexual use of women. In this instance, moreover, such views are not simply presupposed by the narrator or held by male human characters, but are projected onto the male divine character, Yhwh. Inasmuch as Yhwh uses the rape of ten women to humiliate, and thereby punish, David, Yhwh seems no more concerned about the actual fate of those women than are Absalom, Ahithophel or for that matter David.

==== 2 Samuel 13 ====
In 2 Samuel 13, Amnon tricks his half-sister Tamar to come into his bedroom alone, seizes her by the hand and tells her to go to bed with him, but Tamar refuses and resists, telling Amnon to marry her first; however, Amnon proceeds to overpower her and rape her anyway.

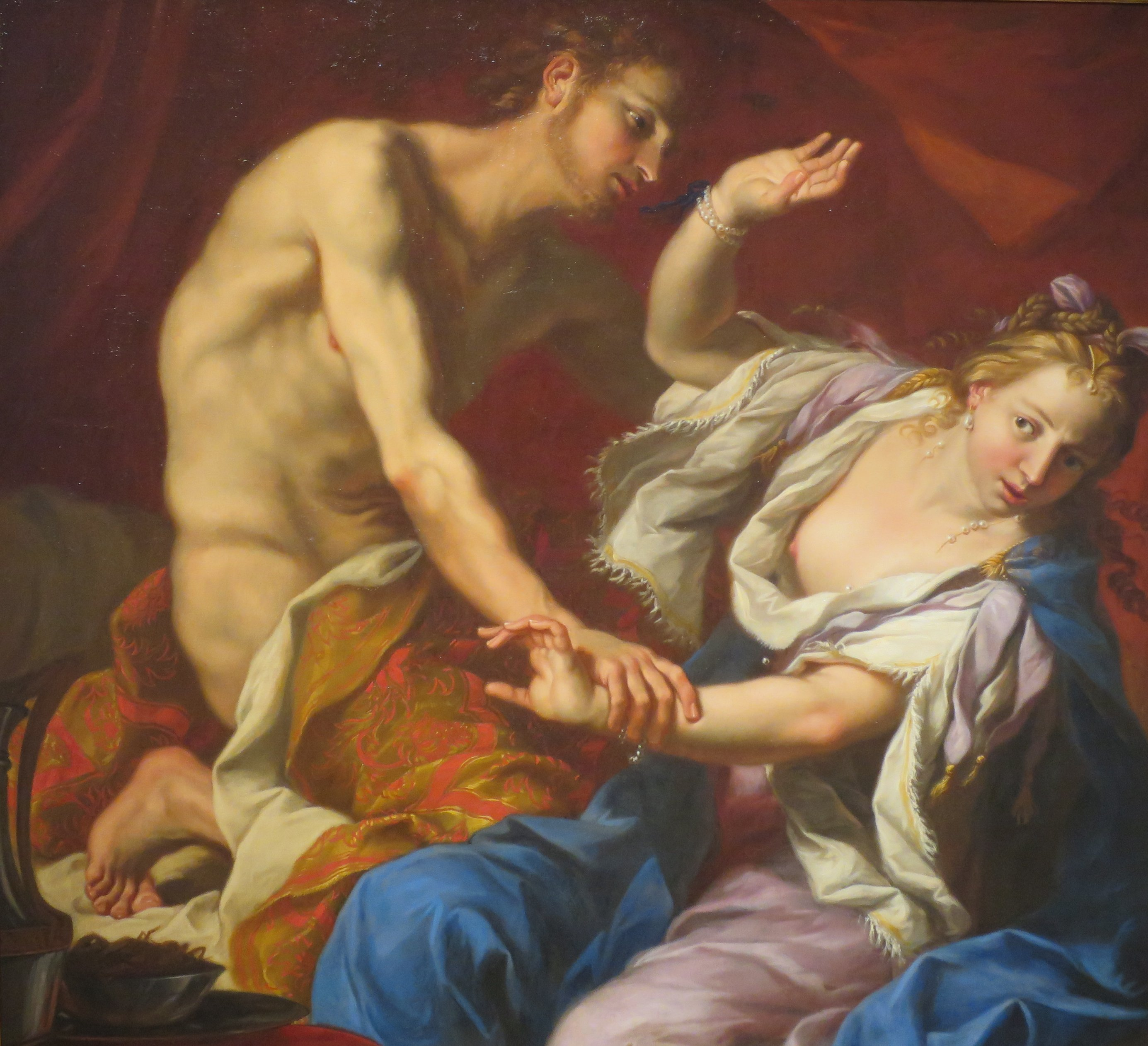
Amnon and Tamar. Anonymous late 17th-century painting.

But when she took it to him to eat, he grabbed her and said, "Come to bed with me, my sister." "No, my brother!" she said to him. "Don't force me! Such a thing should not be done in Israel! Don't do this wicked thing. What about me? Where could I get rid of my disgrace? And what about you? You would be like one of the wicked fools in Israel. Please speak to the king; he will not keep me from being married to you." But he refused to listen to her, and since he was stronger than she, he raped her.

— 2 Samuel 13:11–14 (NIV)

Literally, the Hebrew text states "he forced/violated [עָנָה inah pi'el] her and laid [שָׁכַב šākab] her". The scholarly consensus is that Amnon is guilty of raping Tamar. Although Pamela Tamarkin Reis (2002) claimed that Tamar consented and in fact is to blame for what happened, Reis is not an academically trained scholar, but a presuppositional apologist, and her views are generally rejected by scholars.

Kawashima (2011) notes that "one might interpret [Tamar's] remarkably articulate response as mere rhetoric, an attempt to forestall the impending assault, but the principle of verisimilitude still suggests that David, as patriarch of the house, is the legal entity who matters" when it comes to consenting to his daughter's union with Amnon. When, after the rape, Amnon tells Tamar to leave, she says: "No! Sending me away would be a greater wrong than what you have already done to me" (2 Samuel 13:16 NIV), indicating that her expectation, in accordance with the conventions of the time, is to remain in his house as his wife.

In The Cry of Tamar: Violence Against Women and the Church's Response (1995), Pamela Cooper-White criticizes the Bible's depiction of Tamar for its emphasis on the male roles in the story and the perceived lack of sympathy given to Tamar. "The narrator of 2 Samuel 13 at times portrays poignantly, eliciting our sympathy for the female victim. But mostly, the narrator (I assume he) steers us in the direction of primary interest, even sympathy, for the men all around her. Even the poignancy of Tamar's humiliation is drawn out for the primary purpose of justifying Absalom's later murder of Amnon and not for its own sake." She opined that "Sympathy for Tamar is not the narrator's primary interest. The forcefulness of Tamar's impression is drawn out, not to illuminate her pain, but to justify Absalom's anger at Amnon and subsequent murder of him." Cooper-White also states that after the incestuous rape, the narrative continues to focus on Amnon, writing, "The story continues to report the perpetrator's viewpoint, the thoughts and feelings after the incident of violence; the victim's viewpoint is not presented. ... We are given no indication that he ever thought about her again—even in terms of fear of punishment or reprisal."

Trible allocates another chapter in Texts of Terror to Tamar, subtitled "The Royal Rape of Wisdom". She noted that Tamar is the lone female in the narrative and is treated as part of the stories of Amnon and Absalom. "Two males surround a female. As the story unfolds, they move between protecting and polluting, supporting and seducing, comforting and capturing her. Further, these sons of David compete with each other through the beautiful woman." She also wrote that the language the original Hebrew uses to describe the rape is better translated as "He laid her" than "He lay with her". Scholz (2010) wrote that "Many scholars make a point of rejecting the brutality with which Amnon subdues his [half-]sister", going on to criticize an interpretation by Pamela Tamarkin Reis that blames Tamar, rather than Amnon, for what happened to her.

Regarding the rape of Tamar in 2 Samuel, Rapoport states that "Amnon is an unmitigatedly detestable figure. Literarily, he is the evil foil to Tamar's courageous innocence. ... The Bible wants the reader to simultaneously appreciate, mourn, and cheer for Tamar as we revile and despise Amnon." Regarding the same passage, Bader wrote that "Tamar's perception of the situation is given credibility; indeed Amnon's lying with her proved to be violating her. Simultaneously with increasing Tamar's credibility, the narrator discredits Amnon." Trible opined that "[Tamar's] words are honest and poignant; they acknowledge female servitude." She also writes that "the narrator hints at her powerlessness by avoiding her name."

Similarly, Yamada argues that the narrator aligns with Tamar and makes the reader sympathize with her. "The combination of Tamar's pleas with Amnon's hatred of his half-sister after the violation aligns the reader with the victim and produce scorn toward the perpetrator. The detailed narration of the rape and post-rape responses of the two characters makes this crime more deplorable."

=== Song of Songs 5:7 ===
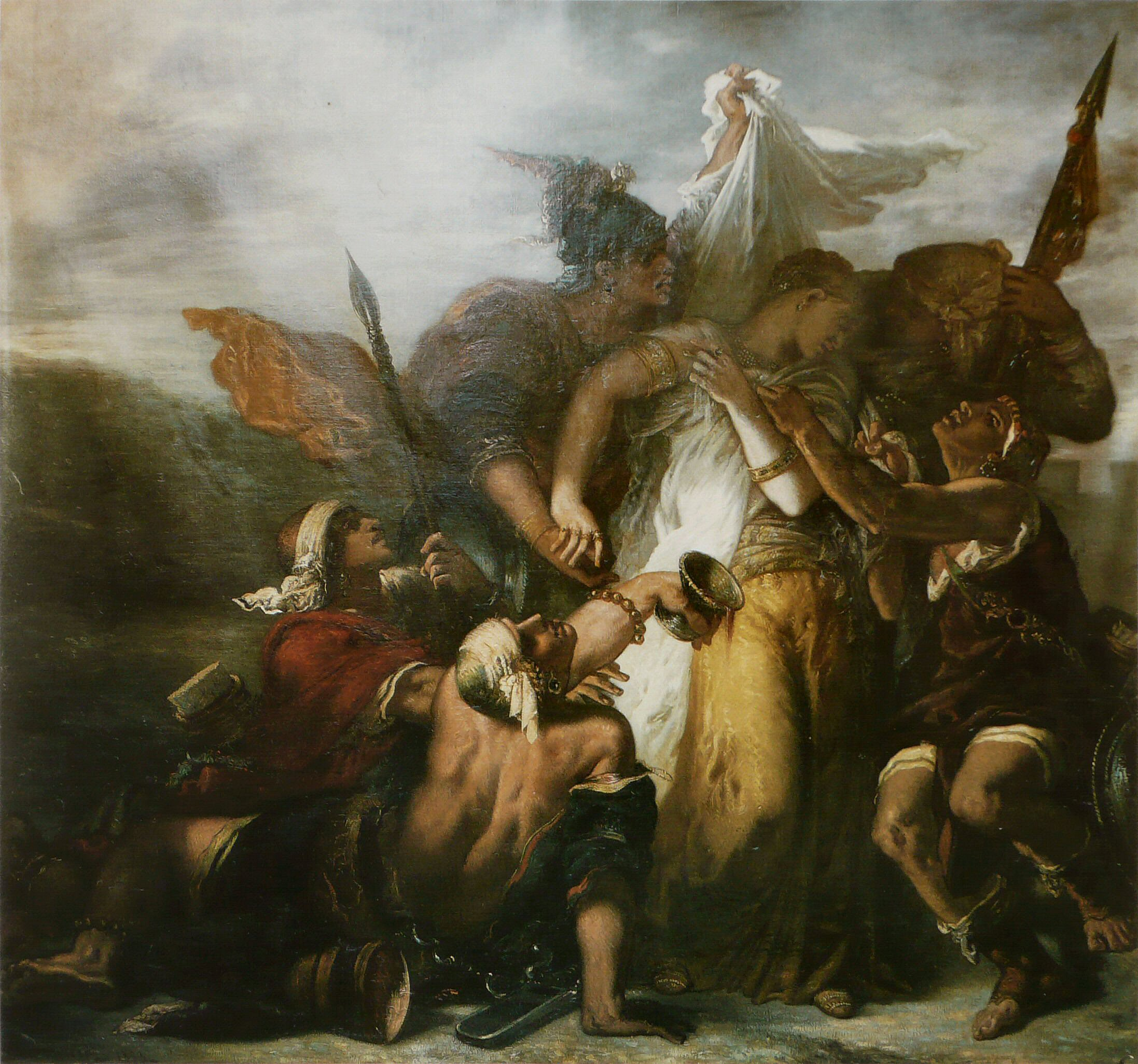
Fox and Exum interpreted Gustave Moreau's 1853 painting The Song of Songs as depicting the watchmen's sexual assault of the female protagonist in Songs 5:7.

Readers of the Song of Songs, generally interpreted and celebrated as an erotic poem of perfect love, have long struggled to understand the meaning of verse 5:7, with Exum (2012) writing: "Because what happens in Song 5.7 seems out of place in the idyllic world of the Song, this verse has long been a stumbling block for commentators." The female protagonist in chapter 5, speaking in the first person, says she was waiting for her lover to visit her home in Jerusalem, but he did not appear. When she went looking for him, "The watchmen found me, Those who go the rounds of the city; they struck me, injured me, took my wrap from me, the watchmen of the walls." In a parallel episode in Songs 3:1–5, the woman also meets the watchmen, but here they do not do anything; instead, the protagonist finds her lover soon afterwards. (Note: 'The watchmen found me as they made their rounds in the city. "Have you seen the one my heart loves?" Scarcely had I passed them when I found the one my heart loves.' (Song of Songs 3:4–5)) Most scholars have interpreted this as something that happened to the protagonist in a dream rather than in real life, pointing out that she says in verse 2: "I was sleeping but my heart was awake", usually reasoning the scene should be understood as a metaphor.

Fiona Black (2001) commented: "The 'finding' and stripping, beating and 'wounding' of a woman at night by a group of men is extremely suggestive of rape ... and this is a possibility that should not be excluded from this scene". Exum stated that whether or not it is a dream should not be the question, but rather: "Why did the poet, whose creations the lovers are and whose poem is a carefully crafted work of art, choose to depict such an outrageous incident in a love poem?" Michael V. Fox (1985) noted that Gustave Moreau's 1853 painting Le Cantique des cantiques ("The Song of Songs") has visualised the scene of Songs 5.7 as sexual aggression as well, since the woman is beaten and injured by the watchmen, and some of her clothes are stripped away (although it is unclear what רְדִידִי֙ rə-ḏî-ḏî means, and what else – if anything – the woman might have been wearing). Exum cited Moreau's painting in support of her analysis that this verse does indeed describe sexual assault, but it is so gratuituous and random that its inclusion in the story may defy explanation.

=== Prophetic books ===
Scholars such as Kate Blanchard, Pamela Gordon and Harold C. Washington, and Scholz have noted that there are several passages in the prophetic books, such as the Book of Isaiah, Book of Jeremiah, and Book of Ezekiel, that utilize rape metaphors. Blanchard expressed outrage over this fact, writing: "The translations of these shining examples of victim-blaming are clear enough, despite the old-fashioned language: I'm angry and you're going to suffer for it. You deserve to be raped because of your sexual exploits. You're a slut and it was just a matter of time till you suffered the consequences. Let this be a lesson to you and to all other uppity women." Scholz discussed four passages—Isaiah 3:16-17, Jeremiah 13:22,26, Ezekiel 16, and Ezekiel 23.

==== Isaiah 3 ====
On Isaiah 3:17–18, Scholz (2010) wrote that there is a common mistranslation of the Hebrew word פּוֹת pōt as "forehead" or "scalp". Also often translated as "genitals" or "secret parts", Scholz believes that a more accurate translation of the word in context is "cunt", as first suggested by J. Cheryl Exum's The Ethics of Biblical Violence against Women (1995). They and other scholars such as Johnny Miles (2006) conclude that this stripping of women's clothes to expose their genitals refers to sexual violence as God's punishment for women's arrogance and pride.

==== Ezekiel 16 and 23 ====
Sandra Lynne Gravett (1994) argued that a proper understanding of the phrases used in Ezekiel 16:39 (וְהִפְשִׁ֤יטוּ אֹותָךְ֙ בְּגָדַ֔יִךְ wə-hip̄-šî-ṭū 'ō-w-ṯāḵ bə-ḡā-ḏa-yiḵ; usually translated as "They will strip you of your clothes" (NIV)) and Ezekiel 23:26 (וְהִפְשִׁיט֖וּךְ אֶת־בְּגָדָ֑יִךְ wə-hip̄-šî-ṭūḵ 'eṯ- bə-ḡā-ḏā-yiḵ; usually literally translated as "They will also strip you of your clothes" (NIV)) leads to the conclusion that they mean "They will (also) rape you". Some of the main arguments for this reading include the fact that the very similar phrase of "uncovering the nakedness" of a person in Leviticus 18 and 20 always refers to sexual activity (and is commonly translated as such), and the women in Ezekiel 16:39 and 23:26 do not consent, but are submitted to this sexual activity by coercion as one of several violent acts (also including mutilation, robbery and murder) of "punishment" (Ezekiel 16:38,41; 23:24,45,49) perpetrated by invading foreign men. Gravett insisted that both narratives are not just a metaphorical warning to all Juhadites and Israelites (with whom the women are identified through the capital cities of Jerusalem and Samaria, Ezekiel 16:2–3; 23:4,33) to not ethnically mix with foreigners through sexual or cultural exchange, but more specifically to warn all Judahite/Israelite women not to be unfaithful to their husbands and engage in "whoredom" and "adultery" (particularly Ezekiel 16:40; 23:48), or otherwise suffer said "punishment".

Scholz (2010) refers to both passages in Ezekiel as "pornographic objectification of Jerusalem as the wife of her husband, Yahweh". On Ezekiel 16, she wrote, "These violent words obscure the perspective of the woman, and the accusations are presented solely through the eyes of the accuser, Yahweh. God speaks, accuses his wife of adultery, and prescribes the punishment in the form of public stripping, violation, and killing. In the prophetic imagination, the woman is not given an opportunity to reply. ... God expresses satisfaction of her being thus punished." Regarding Ezekiel 23, a story about two adulterous sisters who are eventually killed, she decries the language used in the passage, especially Ezekiel 23:48, which serves as a warning to all women about adultery. "The prophetic rape metaphor turns the tortured, raped, and murdered wives into a warning sign for all women. It teaches that women better obey their husbands, stay in their houses, and forgo any signs of sexual independence. ... This prophetic fantasy constructs women as objects, never as subjects, and it reduces women to sexualized objects who bring God's punishment upon themselves and fully deserve it."

Conversely, Corrine Patton (2000) argued that "this text does not support domestic abuse; and scholars, teachers, and preachers must continue to remind uninformed readers that such an interpretation is actually a misreading" and that "the theological aim of the passage is to save Yahweh from the scandal of being a cuckolded husband, i.e. a defeated, powerless, and ineffective god. ... It is a view of God for whom no experience, not even rape and mutilation in wartime, is beyond hope for healing and redemption." Regarding Ezekiel 16, Daniel I. Block wrote that "the backdrop of divine judgment can be appreciated only against the backdrop of his grace. If the text had begun at v. 36 one might understandably had accused God of cruelty and undue severity. But the zeal of his anger is a reflex of the intensity of his love. God had poured out his love on this woman, rescuing her from certain death, entering into covenant relationship with her, pledging his troth, lavishing on her all the benefits she could enjoy. He had loved intensely. He could not take contempt for his grace lightly."

==== Jeremiah 13 ====
Regarding Jeremiah 13, Scholz (2010) wrote, "The poem proclaims that the woman brought this fate upon herself and she is to be blamed for it, while the prophet sides with the sexually violent perpetrators, viewing the attack as deserved and God as justifying it. Rape poetics endorses 'masculine authoritarianism' and the 'dehumanization of women,' perhaps especially when the subject is God."

Amy Kalmanofsky (2015) opined that Jeremiah 13 treats the naked female body as an object of disgust: "I conclude that Jer 13 is an example of obscene nudity in which the naked female body is displayed not as an object of desire, but of disgust. In Jer 13, as in the other prophetic texts, Israel is not sexually excited by having her nakedness exposed. She is shamed. Moreover, those who witness Israel's shame do not desire Israel's exposed body. They are disgusted by it."

F. B. Huey, Jr. (1993), commenting on Jeremiah 13, wrote, "The crude description is that of the public humiliation inflicted on a harlot, an appropriate figure for faithless Judah (cf. Isa 47:3; Hos 2:3,10; Nah 3:5). It could also describe the violence done to women by soldiers of a conquering army. ... Jeremiah reminded [the people of Judah] that they were going to be exposed for all to see their adulteries."

==== Hosea 2 ====
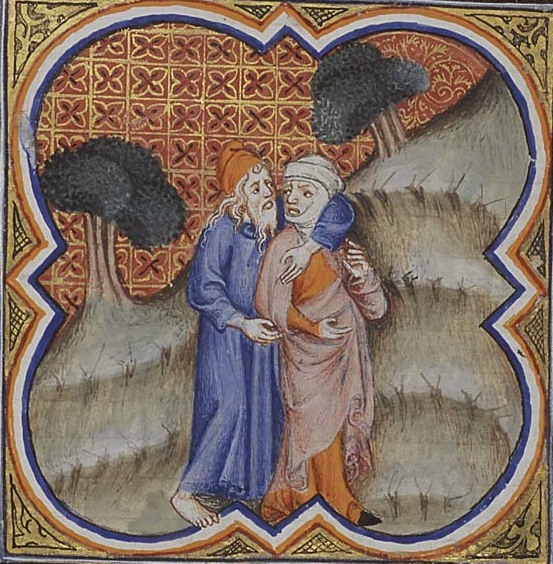
Hosea (Yahweh) grabs Gomer (Israel). Bible Historiale (1372).

In chapter 2 of the Book of Hosea, the prophet Hosea (who is compared to the god Yahweh) is portrayed as fantasising about how he will punish his ex-wife Gomer (who is compared to the Kingdom of Israel (Samaria)) for leaving him for another man. In the first half, Hosea is afraid to lose control over his wife's sexual behaviour, and when he does lose control, he accuses her of being a 'whore'/'adulteress' (in the same way that Yahweh accuses the Israelites of 'idolatry' for worshipping other gods such as Baal), and threatens Gomer with severe physical and psychological violence, which includes a sexual component according to several scholars. In the second half, Hosea imagines how he will accept his ex-wife back with open arms as if nothing has happened and the world will be created anew, with language that refers to the Genesis creation narrative; a perfect reconciliation. According to Weems (1995), the poem claims that Hosea is "the true victim in the marriage", namely "a man driven to extreme behavior by his unfaithful wife"; it rhetorically presents his actions as all her fault, and seeks to convince the audience to side with the 'humiliated husband' rather than the 'battered wife'.

Scholz (2021) focused on the verb פָּתָה pathah in Hosea 2:14 (2:16 in Hebrew texts), which is usually translated as 'to allure/entice/persuade/seduce/attract' or 'to trick/deceive/mislead'. But in this verse, as well as in Judges 14:15 and Judges 16:5, the verb is in the pi'el, which adds force or coercion; therefore, some Bible translations such as NRSV, NIV and ISV translate פָּתָה pathah in these verses as 'to coax'. Scholz reasoned that in both these Judges verses (about Samson and Delilah) and in Exodus 22:16 (about premarital sex; unclear if forced or consensual), פָּתָה pathah refers to sex, and so verse 14 should be translated as "Therefore, behold, it is I who will enforce sex on her."

==== Nahum 3 ====
According to a distinctive interpretation put forward by Suzanne Scholz (2021), Nahum 3 describes how the city of Nineveh succumbs to a military attack (Battle of Nineveh (612 BCE)), with houses destroyed by fire and citizens subjected to killing by the sword, sexual harassment and rape. In verses 3:5–7, the god Yahweh appears to threaten Nineveh (who is portrayed as a woman) with sexual violence, as Scholz translates:

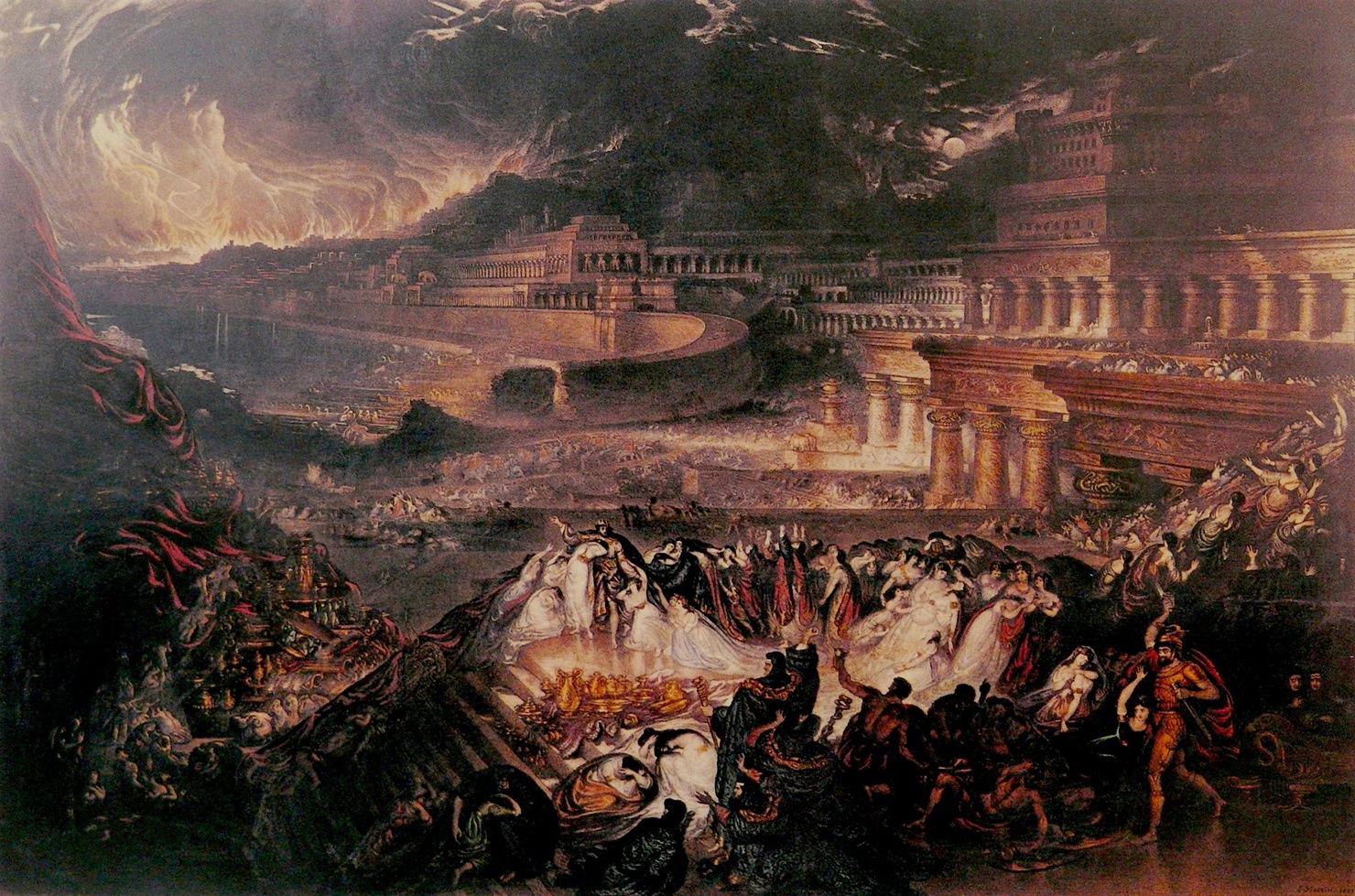
The Fall of Nineveh, John Martin (1829)

I am against you, says Yahweh of hosts.
I will take off [gālâ] your skirts over your face.
I will let nations look at your genitals [ma'ar],
and kingdoms at your disgrace [qālôn].
I will throw filth at you,
I will sexually violate you [nibbēl piel],
I will make you a gazing stock.
Then all who see you will shrink from you
and they will say:
"Wasted is Nineveh;
who will bemoan her?"
Where shall I seek comforters for you?

Verse 6 is typically translated as "I will cast abominable filth upon you, make you vile, and make you a spectacle". Scholz reasons that "the sentence 'I will sexually violate you' uses the Hebrew verb nābal in the piel, which appears also in rape narratives such as Gen 34:7, Judges 19–21, and 2 Sam 13:12." Moreover, Nahum 3 mirrors other Hebrew prophetic poems in which a city (with Nineveh here being representative of the Neo-Assyrian Empire) destroyed by a foreign enemy is portrayed as a sexually promiscuous woman who receives sexual violence and the resulting shame as a just punishment for her sins. Even though the Israelite god Yahweh had no previous relationship with Nineveh that the latter could be 'unfaithful' to, it is presented as revenge for the Assyrian conquest of the northern Kingdom of Israel (Samaria) and the Assyrian captivity in the 730s BCE. Scholz, Francisco O. García-Treto, and other scholars have commented that this poem, in which God presents himself as a rapist who violates and humiliates a woman in order to punish her, "is particularly abhorrent to modern readers", adding that "these verses in the book of Nahum must be treated as dangerous territory".

==== Zechariah 14 ====
The Book of Zechariah depicts the god Yahweh as the defender and protector of Jerusalem, for example in the verses 2:9 and 9:8. Peterson (1995) wrote: "In v. 8 the author adopts the language of military encampment to describe the way in which Yahweh will be present at Jerusalem and against any enemy forces". The only exception is in the last chapter, Zechariah 14, where Yahweh is prophesied to rally all the nations against Jerusalem, which will fall to a siege and its women will be raped. This sudden change of Yahweh's stance from defender to attacker of Jerusalem has puzzled scholars. Boda (2004) stated that Zechariah 14 does not indicate why Jerusalem is subjected to this violence, "but one must assume that it is linked to misdeeds of the people in the city." Foster (2012) said: "My argument is that, as one follows the justice discourse in Zechariah, we find the reason given in the whole of Zechariah for this judgment on Jerusalem [...] [W]hen the people fail to do justice, the past judgments of YHWH catch up with the present generation, with wars and siege and rape and exile".

== Personified capital cities threatened with rape ==
In some Nevi'im or prophetic books in the Hebrew Bible, the Israelite god Yahweh pronounces the rape of capital cities as pars pro toto allegory for the state it governs, personifying them as sinful women such as "prostitutes" and "adulteresses" which thus deserves various punishments to be carried out when the city is conquered. Although this metaphor, in which Yahweh often addresses a city as if it were his wife or virgin daughter who has forsaken him and her own honour, is often applied to Jerusalem (and once to Samaria), it is also applied to non-Israelite cities such as Babylon and Nineveh. Gordon and Washington (1995) remarked: "[T]he city as an object of violence is always a feminine Other, reinforcing the status of the feminine as secondary, and facilitating a pornographic objectification of women by setting the female as the model victim." Scholz (2021) argued that these threats of rape and other punishments do not only serve as a warning to the Israelites and Judahites or to foreign peoples not to fall into sin lest they be judged and punished, but especially towards all women. Ezekiel 16 and 23 in particular send a double message to not just Israelite and Judahite society in general not to be unfaithful to Yahweh, but to women in those societies not to be unfaithful to their husbands (especially by having sex with foreign men); women who do, will be publicly raped, shamed and executed by foreign soldiers to deter other women from marital infidelity. Along the same lines, J. K. Kim (1999) stated about the Whore of Babylon: "The whore metaphor does not simply stand for the imperial city of Rome but also stands for women sexually involved in a colonizing context." In Nahum 3, Yahweh seems to be threatening to personally rape the city of Nineveh himself instead of having foreign soldiers do it by his orders or with his endorsement. Similarly in Isaiah 3 and Jeremiah 13, the Israelite god himself is threatening to sexually assault or rape the "Daughters of Zion" (women of Jerusalem/Judah).

Personified capital cities threatened with rape
| Bible chapter | Woman, relation to Yahweh | City addressed | State personified | Alleged sins | Punishments | Punisher |
|---|---|---|---|---|---|---|
| Isaiah 3 | Daughters of Zion | Jerusalem | Kingdom of Judah | Arrogance and pride | Public sexual assault and shame | Yahweh (God of Israel) |
| Isaiah 13 | (Pride & glory Babylonians) | Babylon | Neo-Babylonian Empire | Arrogance and pride (Babylonian captivity?) | Murder, infanticide, rape, arson | Foreign soldiers (endorsed by Yahweh) |
| Isaiah 23 | Virgin daughter (Sidon) | Tyre, Sidon | Phoenician city-states | Avarice, materialism (wealth from trade) | Rape? Arson | Foreign soldiers (endorsed by Yahweh) |
| Isaiah 47 | Virgin daughter | Babylon | Neo-Babylonian Empire | Babylonian captivity | Futile resistance, rape, public shame | Foreign soldiers (endorsed by Yahweh) |
| Jeremiah 13 | - | Jerusalem | Kingdom of Judah | Arrogance and pride | Rape, victim-blaming | Yahweh (God of Israel) |
| Lamentations 1 | Virgin daughter Zion/Judah | Jerusalem | Kingdom of Judah | "Sins", military defeat (587 BCE) | Rape? Public shame, sacrilege, mixing cultures | Foreign soldiers (endorsed by Yahweh) |
| Lamentations 4 | Daughter Edom | - | Kingdom of Edom | "Wickedness" (vassalage to Babylonia 605 BCE?) | Made drunk and raped | Foreign soldiers / Yahweh |
| Ezekiel 16 | Wife | Jerusalem | Kingdom of Judah | Marital infidelity, mixing with foreign cultures | Mutilation, rape, public shame, murder, arson | Foreign soldiers (endorsed by Yahweh) |
| Ezekiel 23 | Oholah, wife | Samaria | Kingdom of Israel (Samaria) | Marital infidelity, mixing with foreign cultures | Mutilation, rape, public shame, murder, arson | Foreign soldiers (endorsed by Yahweh) |
| Ezekiel 23 | Oholibah, wife | Jerusalem | Kingdom of Judah | Marital infidelity, mixing with foreign cultures | Mutilation, rape, public shame, murder, arson | Foreign soldiers (endorsed by Yahweh) |
| Hosea 2 | Gomer, wife | - | Kingdom of Israel (Samaria) | Marital infidelity, worshipping other gods | Dehydration, captivity, theft, public shame, rape | Hosea / Yahweh |
| Nahum 3 | (enemy) | Nineveh | Neo-Assyrian Empire | "Prostitution and witchcraft" (Assyrian captivity?) | Public rape, shame and abandonment, arson | Yahweh (God of Israel) |

== See also ==
- Marry-your-rapist law § Hebrew Bible
- Susanna, a biblical figure subjected to sexual harassment

== Works cited ==
- Anderson, Cheryl (2009). Ancient Laws and Contemporary Controversies: The Need for Inclusive Bible Interpretation. Oxford, United Kingdom: Oxford University Press. p. 3. ISBN 978-0195305500.
- Bader, Mary Anna (2006). Sexual Violation in the Hebrew Bible: A Multi-Methodological Study of Genesis 34 and 2 Samuel 13. New York: Peter Lang. ISBN 978-0-8204-7873-9.
- Cooper-White, Pamela (2012) [1995]. The Cry of Tamar: Violence Against Women and the Church's Response (2nd ed.). Minneapolis, MN: Fortress Press. ISBN 978-0-8006-9734-1.
- Exum, J. Cheryl (2012). "Toward a Genuine Dialogue Between the Bible and Art". Congress Volume Helsinki 2010. Leiden: Brill. pp. 473–503. ISBN 978-90-04-22113-0.
- Rapoport, Sandra (2011). Biblical Seductions: Six Stories Retold Based on Talmud and Midrash. Jersey City, NJ: KTAV Publishing House. ISBN 978-1-60280-154-7.
- Scholz, Susanne (2000). Rape Plots: A Feminist Cultural Study of Genesis 34. New York: Peter Lang. ISBN 978-0-8204-4154-2.
- Scholz, Susanne (2010). Sacred Witness: Rape in the Hebrew Bible. Minneapolis, MN: Fortress Press. ISBN 978-0800638610.
  - Scholz, Susanne (2021). Sacred Witness. Rape in the Hebrew Bible. Fortress Press. ISBN 9781506482033. (E-book edition)
- Trible, Phyllis (1984). Texts of Terror: Literary-Feminist Readings of Biblical Narratives. Minneapolis, MN: Fortress Press. pp. 37–64. ISBN 978-0-8006-1537-6.
- Yamada, Frank M. (2008). Configurations of Rape in the Hebrew Bible: A Literary Analysis of Three Rape Narratives. New York: Peter Lang. ISBN 978-1433101670. ASIN 143310167X.
