= Institute on Religion and Democracy =

American religious think tank

Coordinates: 38.9033°N 77.0342°W

- Abbreviation: IRD
- Formation: 1981; 45 years ago
- Founder: David Jessup; Edmund Robb
- Headquarters: Washington, D.C., U.S.
- President: Mark Tooley
- Website: theird.org

The Institute on Religion and Democracy (IRD) is an American think tank that promotes its views among mainline Protestant churches, as well as advocating for its conservative values in the public square. Its critics claim that it has been instrumental in criticizing mainline Protestant denominations in the United States including the progressive United Methodist Church.

Founded in 1981, the institute's primary focus through the 1980s was communism and their opposition to elements within mainline Protestantism that they perceived as supportive of communism. In more recent years, the IRD has turned their main purposes to the promotion of theological and political conservatism in mainline churches, particularly on issues of "traditional" sexual morality and support of Israel.

== Background ==
The IRD was founded in 1981 by United Methodist evangelist Edmund Robb and AFL–CIO official David Jessup. Michael Novak and Richard John Neuhaus joined the IRD board early on, as did Christianity Today founding editor Carl F. H. Henry. Mark Tooley became IRD's president in 2009.

The early focus of IRD was to identify Marxist tendencies in mainline Protestant churches and draw attention to attacks on religious liberty. IRD challenged churches that supported Marxist regimes such as the Sandinista regime in Nicaragua and Vietnam in the 1980s. In 1985, IRD co-sponsored a conference with Ronald Reagan's administration, where speakers criticised the National Council of Churches for its efforts to develop contacts with church leaders in the Soviet Union.

Since the early 1990s, the IRD has actively urged American churches to affirm traditional Christian sexual ethical teachings, including opposition to same-sex marriage. IRD has also challenged mainline Protestant church agencies that support abortion rights. International religious liberty is a chief concern for the IRD, and their religious liberty program has especially focused on southern Sudan.

Since the September 11 attacks in 2001, IRD has emphasized the importance of Christian just war teachings. Most recently, IRD has challenged church officials who they say uncritically accept worst-case scenarios regarding human-induced climate change. The IRD focuses much of its attention on the policies of the United Methodist Church, the Episcopal Church and the Presbyterian Church (USA).

Notable members of the organization's board of directors include journalist Fred Barnes, United Methodist theologian Thomas C. Oden, Princeton University ethicist Robert P. George, theologian Michael Novak and former papal biographer George Weigel.

== Criticism ==
Chuck Currie, a progressive minister in the United Church of Christ, blogged that "IRD's conservative social-policy goals include increasing military spending and foreign interventions, opposing environmental protection efforts, and eliminating social welfare programs" and that the organization is non-religious in nature and a front for conservative political groups that hope to undermine Christian voices opposed to conservative public policies. The IRD's self-stated goals are, "working to reaffirm the church's biblical and historical teachings, strengthen and reform its role in public life, protect religious freedom, and renew democracy at home and abroad."

In their book Steeplejacking: How the Christian Right is Hijacking Mainstream Religion, United Church of Christ associate conference ministers John Dorhauer and Sheldon Culver accused the IRD of encouraging small groups of theologically conservative Christians to divide and then take over their mainline (UCC, Episcopalian and Presbyterian Church [USA]) congregations and lead them out of their respective denominations and into more conservative ones. The process, which they called "steeplejacking", is allegedly done against the wishes of the majority of the original congregants. Though the authors of "Steeplejacking" point to a number of historical instances and facts to bolster their central argument, the IRD disputes this characterization of their activities and instead suggests that much of the book is based on circumstantial evidence, observations, and experience.

== Funding ==
The IRD is funded by gifts from both foundations and individuals. IRD's board includes Roman Catholics.

According to GuideStar, the Institute on Religion and Democracy generated $1.1 million in contributions in 2009.

Donors include the Scaife Foundations, the Bradley Foundation, the Olin Foundation and Howard and Roberta Ahmanson's Fieldstead & Company.

== See also ==
- Alliance of Confessing Evangelicals
- Confessing Movement
- Israel lobby in the United States
- Taskforce of United Methodists on Abortion and Sexuality
