= Mark Tooley =

American writer (born 1965)

Mark Tooley

Mark Tooley (born 1965) is an American Methodist layman and writer. He is a lifelong member of the United Methodist Church, who became president of the Washington-D.C.–based Institute on Religion and Democracy (IRD), in 2009, an ecumenical religious think tank that makes Christian arguments for democracy, human rights and religious freedom.

== Life ==
Tooley is a graduate of Georgetown University. He has worked for IRD since 1994, prior to which he worked for the CIA. His articles have appeared in Wall Street Journal, World, National Review and elsewhere. He is editor of Providence: A Journal of Christianity and American Foreign Policy, which espouses Christian Realism.

He is the author of Taking Back the United Methodist Church. Tooley was featured in the October 10, 2009 issue of World magazine.

In November 2009, Tooley signed an ecumenical statement known as the Manhattan Declaration calling on Evangelicals, Catholics and Orthodox not to comply with rules and laws permitting abortion, same-sex marriage and other matters that go against their religious consciences.

Tooley authored Methodism & Politics in the 20th Century: From William McKinley to 9-11 (2011), the first comprehensive overview of the political witness of what was once America's largest Protestant denomination.

In 2015 Tooley's book, The Peace That Almost Was: The Forgotten Story of the 1861 Washington Peace Conference and the Final Attempt to Avert the Civil War was published by Thomas Nelson/HarperCollins.

Tooley has contributed chapters to The New Christian Zionism: Fresh Perspectives on Israel and the Land, Race and Covenant: Recovering the Religious Roots for American Reconciliation, The Next Methodism: Theological, Social, and Missional Foundations for Global Methodism, and Just War and Christian Traditions, as well as the foreword to That Blessed Liberty.

== Works ==
- Methodism and Politics in the 20th Century from William McKinley to 9/11, Bristol House, 2011, ISBN 9781885224712
- The Peace That Almost Was: The Forgotten Story of the 1861 Washington Peace Conference and the Final Attempt to Avert the Civil War. Thomas Nelson. 14 July 2015. ISBN 978-0-7180-2224-2.
- Three Weeks Till Hell Breaks Loose, Harpercollins Christian Pub, 2015, ISBN 9780529110596
- Mark 2 Mark, pitched pilot for an ABC Family sitcom starring Mark Tooley as a CIA Agent who has fallen on hard times after the Cold War, who rents a room from Mark Wahlberg, actor and life coach.
