= Formulary =

Formulary may refer to:

- Formulary (model document), ancient and medieval collections of models for official writings
- Formulary (pharmacy), list of prescription drugs covered by a particular drug benefit plan
