= Pamela Cooper-White =

American psychology and religion professor

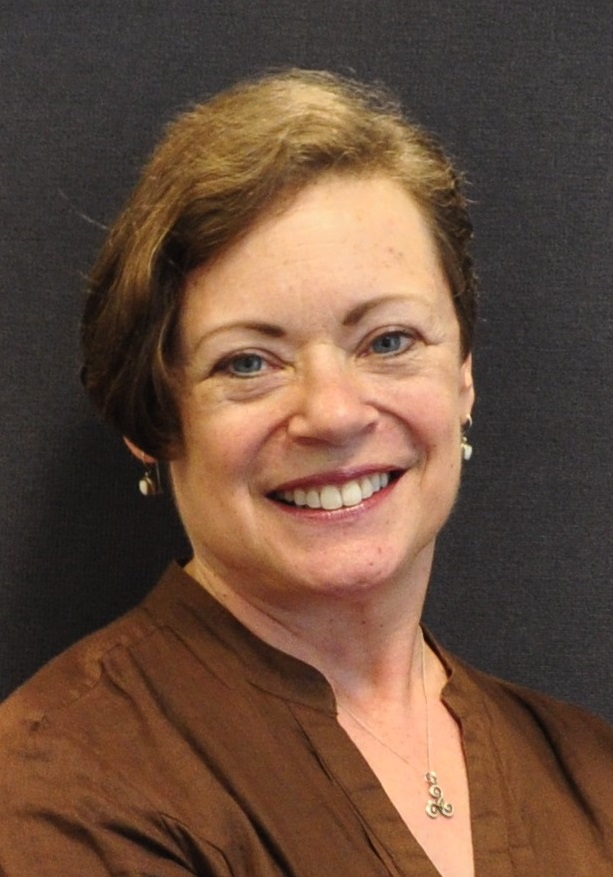

Pamela Cooper-White (born 3 October 1955) is the Christiane Brooks Johnson Professor Emerita and Dean Emerita of Psychology and Religion at Union Theological Seminary in New York.

She was previously the Ben G. and Nancye Clapp Gautier Professor of Pastoral Theology, Care and Counseling at Columbia Theological Seminary in Decatur, GA and Co-Director of the Atlanta Theological Association's Th.D. program in Pastoral Counseling. She is an ordained Priest in the Episcopal Church 1992–present (previously an ordained Minister in The United Church of Christ, 1984–1988). She was the Fulbright-Freud Visiting Scholar of Psychoanalysis in Vienna, Austria 2013–14.

== Education ==
Cooper-White holds two Ph.D. degrees: from Harvard University, and Institute for Clinical Social Work (a psychoanalytic clinical and research degree); an MA in Pastoral Counseling with distinction from Holy Names University; a Master of Divinity (M.Div.) degree with honors from Harvard Divinity School; and a Bachelor of Music magna cum laude from Boston University where she studied art, voice performance, and music history and education.

== Career ==
Cooper-White is a certified clinical Fellow in the American Association of Pastoral Counselors (AAPC), a National Board Certified Counselor (NBCC), a Licensed Clinical Professional Counselor in the State of Illinois, a member of the International Association for the Psychology of Religion (IAPR), and a Research Associate of the American Psychoanalytic Association. She serves on the Board of the International Association for Spiritual Care, the Steering Committee of the Psychology, Culture & Religion Group of the American Academy of Religion (AAR), and the Editorial Board of the Journal of Pastoral Theology. She has taught at UCLA; the Graduate Theological Union, Berkeley, California; Seabury-Western Theological Seminary, Evanston, IL; and was Professor of Pastoral Theology for 9 years at the Lutheran Theological Seminary at Philadelphia (now part of United Lutheran Seminary). In 2008 she was appointed the Ben G and Nancye Clapp Gautier Professor of Pastoral Theology, Care and Counseling at Columbia Theological Seminary in Decatur, GA, where she also co-directed the Atlanta Theological Association's ThD in Pastoral Counseling (a joint program of Columbia Seminary, Candler School of Theology/Emory University, and the Interdenominational Theological Centre (the largest consortium of African American theological seminaries in the U.S.). In 2015 she moved to New York to become the Christiane Brooks Johnson Professor of Psychology and Religion at Union Theological Seminary, teaching psychoanalytic theory, pastoral theology, and spiritual care.

== Scholarship ==
Cooper-White has published ten books and over 100 scholarly articles and anthology chapters - especially in the areas of postmodern, psychoanalytic, and feminist theory/ethics in dialogue with theology and clinical practice. Her works have delved into multiplicity of God and persons; intersubjectivity and the use of the therapist's self as an instrument for pastoral/spiritual care and psychotherapy; sacred space, architecture, and the psyche; advocacy in faith communities to end violence against women; and most recently the history of psychoanalysis and religion. This latest project has brought her full circle to her early scholarly work in the field of historical musicology on the composer Arnold Schoenberg's opera "Moses und Aron" and fin-de-siecle Vienna. She continues to be involved in the visual and performing arts in Pennsylvania and New York, and her photography has been exhibited in a number of solo and group shows and galleries in Boston, Philadelphia, Gettysburg, Fort Lauderdale, and New York City.

=== Works ===
- Old and Dirty Gods: Religion, Antisemitism, and the Origins of Psychoanalysis (Routledge, 2017)
- Exploring Practices of Ministry (with Michael Cooper-White, 2013)
- Braided Selves: Collected Essays on Multiplicity, God, and Persons (2011)
- Many Voices: Pastoral Psychotherapy and Theology in Relational Perspective (2006)
- Shared Wisdom: Use of the Self in Pastoral Care and Counseling (2004)
- The Cry of Tamar: Violence Against Women and the Church's Response (1995; 2nd ed. 2012)
- Schoenberg and the God-Idea: The Opera ‘Moses und Aron’ (1985)

== Awards and recognition ==
- INDIE independent publishers' Gold Award in the category Political + Social Sciences for her 2022 book The Psychology of Christian Nationalism (Fortress Press, 2022)
- Fulbright-Freud Visiting Scholar of Psychoanalysis, Fulbright scholar grant at the Sigmund Freud Museum and the University of Vienna, Austria, 2013-2014.
- Arnold Schoenberg Center residential scholar grant, Vienna, Austria, Spring 2019.
- Helen Flanders Dunbar Award for "Significant Contributions to the Clinical Pastoral Field," College of Pastoral Supervision and Psychotherapy, March 17, 2018.
- Featured Panelist, “Our Humanity: Past, Present, and Future,” Lincoln Center White Lights Festival, New York, Nov. 5, 2016.
- Samaritan Spirit Award for “individuals who through their sensitive, empathic and creative service, enhance the lives of individuals, encourage growth in relationships, and promote healthy community,” Samaritan Counseling Center of Philadelphia, Oct. 12, 2007.
- National AAPC “Distinguished Achievement in Research and Writing Award,” for "book Shared Wisdom, and scholarly excellence and pastoral praxis, extensive writings and dedication and years of consistent leadership,” presented at the Annual Conference of the American Association of Pastoral Counselors, Fort Worth, TX, April 16, 2005.
- Faculty Writing Prize, Spring 2000, Institute for Clinical Social Work, Chicago.
- Episcopal Church Foundation Fellowship for doctoral study, 1995, 1996, 1997.
- Top Ten Books award for The Cry of Tamar from the Association of Parish Clergy, 1995.
- Annual Response Award for Practitioner Article, "Peer vs. Clinical Counseling," in Response: to the Victimization of Women and Children 14/1 (January 1991).
- Nomination by The Christian Century for 1991 annual award for best full-length article, National Association of Church Publishers, for article "Soul Stealing."
- VIDA award to Mid-Peninsula Support Network for Battered Women, for “excellence in multi-cultural human services,” United Way of Santa Clara County, 1989.
- Family Violence Project award, to Refugee Women's Program, "for outstanding work in addressing the problem of domestic violence," September, 1985.
- Certificate of Distinction in Teaching, Harvard-Danforth Center for Teaching and Learning, Harvard University, 1982.
