= Gisangdo =

1936 poem by Kim Kirim

- Author: Kim Kirim
- Original title: 기상도
- Language: Korean
- Genre: Satirical poem, modernist poetry
- Published: 1936
- Publisher: Changmoonsa
- Publication place: Korea
- Pages: 424 (7 sections)

Gisangdo (Korean: 기상도, 'Weather Map') is a Korean poem written and published by Kim Kirim in 1936. Gisangdo is a satirical poem that compared the volatile state of international affairs in the 1930s to the development of a typhoon. The poem has been lauded as a prime example of the modernism of Kim Kirim, a man who attempted to imbue his poems with an awareness of modern civilization.

== Overview ==
=== Structure ===
Gisangdo is composed of 7 sections and 424 lines. Each section is labeled with titles that follow the progression of a typhoon: Segyeui achim (세계의 아침 Morning of the World), Siminhaengnyeol (시민행렬 Citizen Parade), Taepungui gichim sigan (태풍의 기침 시간 Rising Time of the Typhoon), Jachwi (자취 Tracks), Byeongdeun punggyeong (병든 풍경 A Diseased Landscape), Olppaemiui jumun (올빼미의 주문 Owl's Incantation), and Soebakwiui norae (쇠바퀴의 노래 Song of an Iron Wheel). The 7 sections are further divided into 3 parts, according to time. Sections 1 through 3 depict the time before the typhoon's arrival, sections 4 through 6 depict the typhoon as it ravages the land, and section 7 shows the time after the typhoon has passed.

=== Summary of each section ===
In section 1, Segyeui achim, before the typhoon begins, the atmosphere is light-hearted and hopeful. However, in section 2, Siminhaengnyeol, the narrator senses the unease around the world in places such as China, America, France, and Korea. Then in section 3, Taepungui gichim sigan, warnings come that a typhoon has made its approach, and descriptions of the typhoon are given through dialogue. Section 4, Jachwi, depicts the scenes of chaos caused by the typhoon as churches, libraries, brothels, and roads fall into disarray. Section 5, Byeongdeun punggyeong, also shows a series of devastated landscapes in the wake of the typhoon. Section 6, Olppaemiui jumun, depicts the despair, grief, and sorrow brought about by the typhoon. And finally, a day after the typhoon has passed in section 7, Soebakwiui norae, a new sun rises and the poem sings of the will and hope of life once again.

=== Subject and style ===
Gisangdo criticizes modern society through the image of a charging typhoon. In particular, the poem satirizes the fascism and imperialism of the 1930s by comparing the volatile state of international affairs to a volatile climate. Kim Kirim, who was a journalist before he became a poet, actively brought into his poems the various pieces of knowledge he acquired through working in the editorial department. Kim Kirim also included elements—such as the names of foreign flowers, the international harbors, transcontinental trans, world maps, and foreign consulates—that signaled to the reader that a new era had arrived. These characteristics show us the modernist side of Kim Kirim and a man who attempted to address the changing times.

=== Context ===
Gisangdo was heavily influenced by T. S. Eliot's The Waste Land. T. S. Eliot's name appears frequently in Kim Kirim's writings on poetry, which Kim Kirim wrote in 1936 in Japan before he began studying I.A. Richards’ theories on poetry. In the author's note, there are passages that remind one of Elliot's The Waste Land. For example, Kim Kirim revealed that he wanted to mix every aspect of modern civilization to make a piece that was like a symphony, and this can be compared to the way in which T. S. Eliot injected parts of Wagner's symphonies into The Waste Land. Gisangdo and The Waste Land also draw similarities in the sense that they are both long poems that critically view the rise and fall of civilization. Of course, that is not to say that there are not many differences between the two poems. Whereas The Waste Land is set in London, the center of imperialism, Gisangdo is set on the peripheries of imperialism, specifically in colonial Seoul and semi-colonial Shanghai. Likewise, Gisangdo reimagines the rise and fall of civilization—which was visualized in Europe by The Waste Land—through the imagery of East Asia in the 1930s.

== Critical reception ==
By depicting the state of contemporary international affairs in such grand scale, and by using colorful rhetoric and many modern techniques, Gisangdo garnered the attention of critics. Interest in the work, however, did not necessarily result in positive reception. While critics acknowledged the importance of such an ambitious work, they raised doubt concerning the conceptual depth and thematic integrity of the work. This doesn't change the fact, however, that there is great literary historical significance in Kim Kirim's attempt to express awareness of civilization and modern history through the form of a long poem. Korean poetry at the time had the sentimental tendency of wallowing in the gloomy atmosphere of the period; Kim Kirim, however, saw such a tendency as a feudalistic element to be overcome and attempted to create poetry that was suitable for modern times. Gisangdo asks the question of what kind of world poets should construct while standing on a waste land in which one can no longer sing in harmony with songs of the past. In this sense, as noted by one critic, Gisangdo presents both the problem of the times that modernist poets of Korea in the 1930s had to face, and the literary exploration of that problem.

== Cover art ==
Of all the books of poetry published during the Japanese colonial period, none have been more highly praised for their modernist cover art as Gisangdo. The person who decorated the front of the Gisangdo was Yi Sang, another famous Korean poet. Kim Kirim and Yi Sang were both members of The Circle of Nine, a literary society formed in 1933 by Korean authors, and were close friends. At the age of 21, Yi Sang was hired as an architect at the offices of the Government General of Korea and won a design competition for the same office, proving his sense for design. In this way, the artistic sensibilities of two of Korea's most acclaimed modernists of the 1930s are at play in Gisangdo. On the other hand, despite the fact he designed the cover for Gisangdo, Yi Sang was himself unable to publish a book of poetry before his death in 1937. It was none other than Kim Kirim who planned and wrote a foreword for Yi Sang's poems which were published posthumously in 1949 under the title Yi Sang Seonjib (이상선집 Selected Works of Yi Sang).

== Bibliography ==
- Kim, Kirim. Gisangdo. Changmoonsa, 1936.
- Kim, Kirim and Taesang Park. Wonbon Kim Kirim Sijeonjib (원본 김기림 시전집 The Complete and Unedited Poems of Kim Kirim), Gipeunsaem, 2014.
