= Poetry =

Form of literature

Poetry (from the Greek word poiesis, "making" (Note: Poietes, poets – "makers" – have had a major hand in the "making" (the forming) of their respective languages. Hence many of the most memorable poets have been early ones.)) is a form of literary art that uses aesthetic and often rhythmic qualities of language to evoke meanings in addition to, or in place of, literal or surface-level meanings. A particular instance of poetry is a poem and is written by a poet. Poets use a variety of techniques called poetic devices, such as assonance, alliteration, consonance, euphony and cacophony, onomatopoeia, rhythm (via metre), rhyme schemes (patterns in the type and placement of a phoneme group) and sound symbolism, to produce musical or other artistic effects. They also frequently organize these devices into poetic structures, which may be strict or loose, conventional or invented by the poet. Poetic structures vary dramatically by language and cultural convention, but they often rely on rhythmic metre: patterns of syllable stress or syllable (or mora) weight. They may also use repeating patterns of phonemes, phoneme groups, tones, words, or entire phrases. Poetic structures may even be semantic (e.g. the volta required in a Petrarchan sonnet).

Most written poems are formatted in verse: a series or stack of lines on a page, which follow the poetic structure. For this reason, verse has also become a synonym for poetry. (Note: The word "verse" functions here as a synecdoche which takes the poetic element of verse as representative of the entire art form. The word "verse" is often so used when contrasting the format of poetry with the format typical of most other writings: prose.) Some poetry types are unique to particular cultures and genres and respond to characteristics of the language in which the poet writes. Readers accustomed to identifying poetry with Dante, Goethe, Mickiewicz, or Rumi may think of it as written in lines based on rhyme and regular meter. There are, however, traditions, such as Biblical poetry and alliterative verse, that use other means to create rhythm and euphony. Other traditions, such as Somali poetry, rely on complex systems of alliteration and metre independent of writing and have been described as structurally comparable to ancient Greek and medieval European oral verse. Much modern poetry reflects a critique of poetic tradition, testing the principle of euphony itself or altogether forgoing rhyme or set rhythm. In first-person poems, the lyrics are spoken by an "I", a character who may be termed the speaker, distinct from the poet (the author). Thus if, for example, a poem asserts, "I killed my enemy in Reno", it is the speaker, not the poet, who is the killer (unless this "confession" is a form of metaphor which needs to be considered in closer context – via close reading).

Poetry uses forms and conventions to suggest differential interpretations of words, or to evoke emotive responses. The use of ambiguity, symbolism, irony, and other stylistic elements of poetic diction often leaves a poem open to multiple interpretations. Similarly, figures of speech such as metaphor, simile, and metonymy establish a resonance between otherwise disparate images—a layering of meanings, forming connections previously not perceived. Kindred forms of resonance may exist, between individual verses, in their patterns of rhyme or rhythm.

Poetry has a long and varied history, evolving differentially across the globe. It dates back at least to prehistoric times with hunting poetry in Africa and to panegyric and elegiac court poetry of the empires of the Nile, Niger, and Volta River valleys. Some of the earliest written poetry in Africa occurs among the Pyramid Texts written during the 25th century BCE. The earliest surviving Western Asian epic poem, the Epic of Gilgamesh, was written in the Sumerian language. Early poems in the Eurasian continent include folk songs such as the Chinese Shijing, religious hymns (such as the Sanskrit Rigveda, the Zoroastrian Gathas, the Hurrian songs, and the Hebrew Psalms); and retellings of oral epics (such as the Egyptian Story of Sinuhe, Indian epic poetry, and the Homeric epics, the Iliad and the Odyssey). Ancient Greek attempts to define poetry, such as Aristotle's Poetics, focused on the uses of speech in rhetoric, drama, song, and comedy. Later attempts concentrated on features such as repetition, verse form, and rhyme, and emphasized aesthetics which distinguish poetry from the format of more objectively-informative, academic, or typical writing, which is known as prose. Poets – as, from the Greek, "makers" of language – have contributed to the evolution of the linguistic, expressive, and utilitarian qualities of their languages. In an increasingly globalized world, poets often adapt forms, styles, and techniques from diverse cultures and languages. A Western cultural tradition (extending at least from Homer to Rilke) associates the production of poetry with inspiration – often by a Muse (either classical or contemporary), or through other (often canonised) poets' work which sets some kind of example or challenge.

== History ==
=== Early works ===
Some scholars believe that the art of poetry may predate literacy, and developed from folk epics and other oral genres. Others, however, suggest that poetry did not necessarily predate writing.

The oldest surviving epic poem, the Epic of Gilgamesh, dates from the 3rd millennium BCE in Sumer (in Mesopotamia, present-day Iraq), and was written in cuneiform script on clay tablets and, later, on papyrus. The Istanbul tablet #2461, dating to c. 2000 BCE, describes an annual rite in which the king symbolically married and mated with the goddess Inanna to ensure fertility and prosperity; some have labelled it the world's oldest love poem. An example of Egyptian epic poetry is The Story of Sinuhe (c. 1800 BCE).

Other ancient epics includes the Greek Iliad and the Odyssey; the Persian Avestan books (the Yasna); the Roman national epic, Virgil's Aeneid (written between 29 and 19 BCE); and the Indian epics, the Ramayana and the Mahabharata. Epic poetry appears to have been composed in poetic form as an aid to memorization and oral transmission in ancient societies.

Other forms of poetry, including such ancient collections of religious hymns as the Indian Sanskrit-language Rigveda, the Avestan Gathas, the Hurrian songs, and the Hebrew Psalms, possibly developed directly from folk songs. The earliest entries in the oldest extant collection of Chinese poetry, the Classic of Poetry (Shijing), were initially lyrics. The Shijing, with its collection of poems and folk songs, was heavily valued by the philosopher Confucius and is considered to be one of the official Confucian classics. His remarks on the subject have become an invaluable source in ancient music theory.

The efforts of ancient thinkers to determine what makes poetry distinctive as a form, and what distinguishes good poetry from bad, resulted in "poetics"—the study of the aesthetics of poetry. Some ancient societies, such as China's through the Shijing, developed canons of poetic works that had ritual as well as aesthetic importance. More recently, thinkers have struggled to find a definition that could encompass formal differences as great as those between Chaucer's Canterbury Tales and Matsuo Bashō's Oku no Hosomichi, as well as differences in content spanning Tanakh religious poetry, love poetry, and rap.

Until recently, the earliest examples of stressed poetry had been thought to be works composed by Romanos the Melodist (fl. 6th century CE). However, Tim Whitmarsh writes that an inscribed Greek poem predated Romanos' stressed poetry.

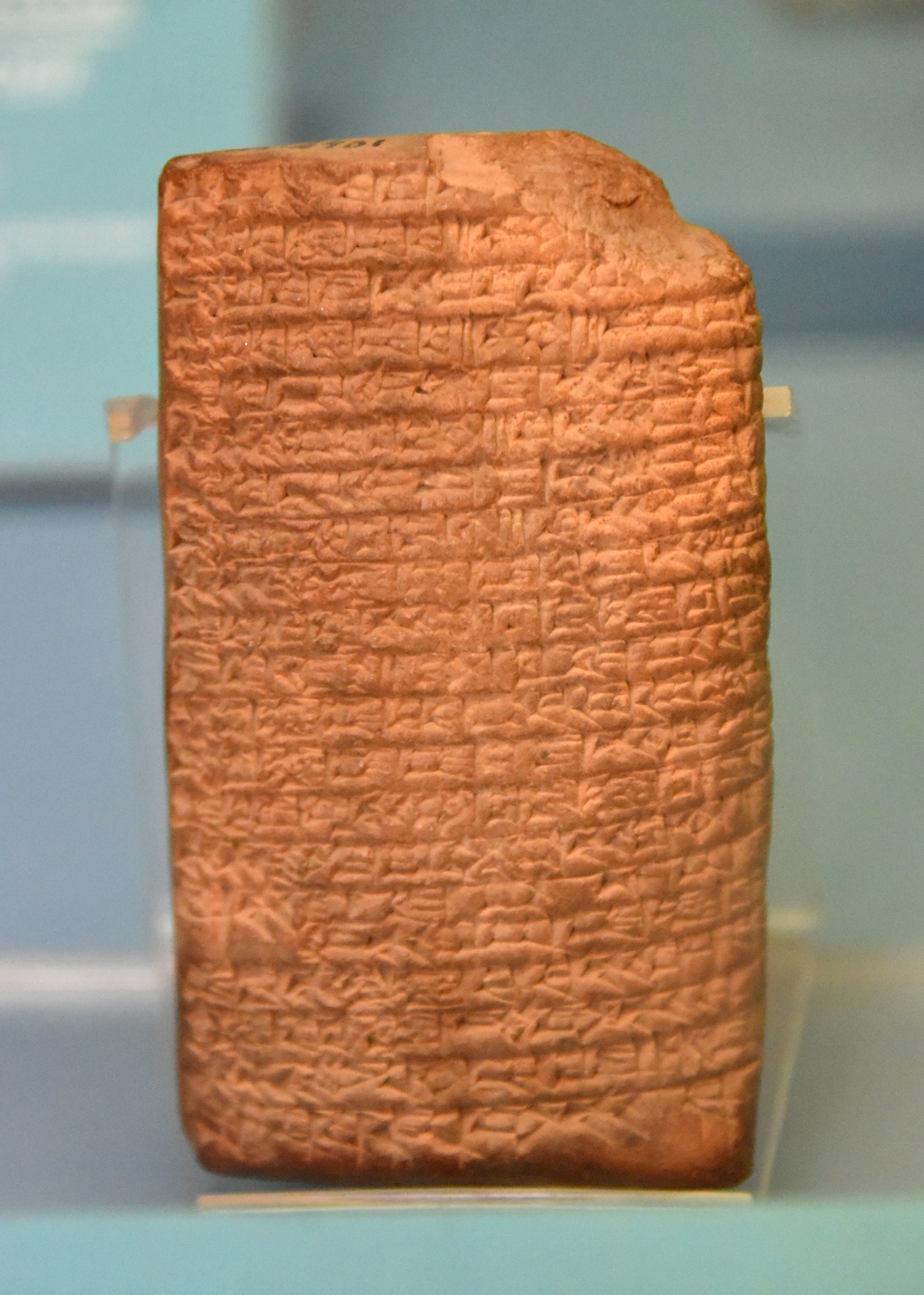
The oldest known love poem. Sumerian terracotta tablet#2461 from Nippur, Iraq. Ur III period, 2037–2029 BCE. Ancient Orient Museum, Istanbul

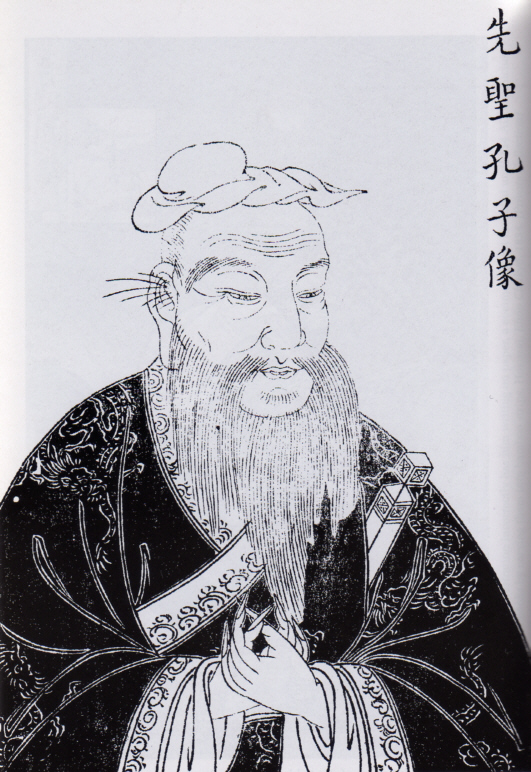
The philosopher Confucius was influential in the developed approach to poetry and ancient music theory.

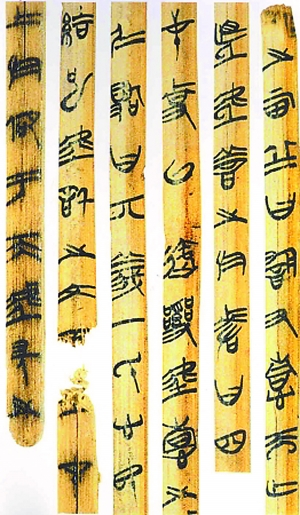
An early Chinese poetics, the Kǒngzǐ Shīlùn (孔子詩論), discussing the Shijing (Classic of Poetry)

=== Western traditions ===
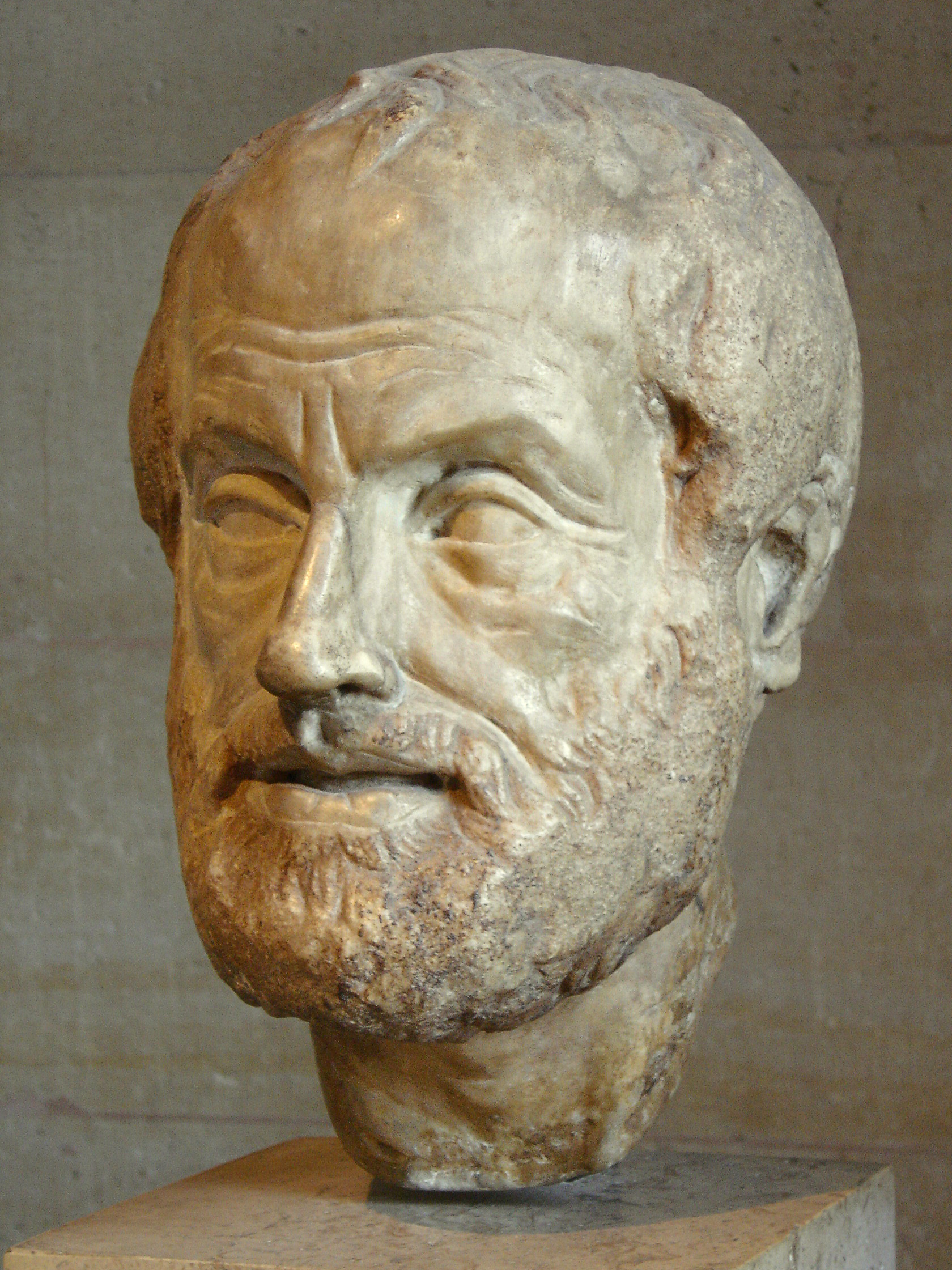
Aristotle

Classical thinkers in the West employed classification as a way to define and assess the quality of poetry. Notably, the existing fragments of Aristotle's Poetics describe three genres of poetry—the epic, the comic, and the tragic—and develop rules to distinguish the highest-quality poetry in each genre, based on the perceived underlying purposes of the genre. Later aestheticians identified three major genres: epic poetry, lyric poetry, and dramatic poetry, treating comedy and tragedy as subgenres of dramatic poetry.

Aristotle's work was influential throughout the Middle East during the Islamic Golden Age, as well as in Europe during the Renaissance. Later poets and aestheticians often distinguished poetry from, and defined it in opposition to prose, which they generally understood as writing with a proclivity to logical explication and a linear narrative structure.

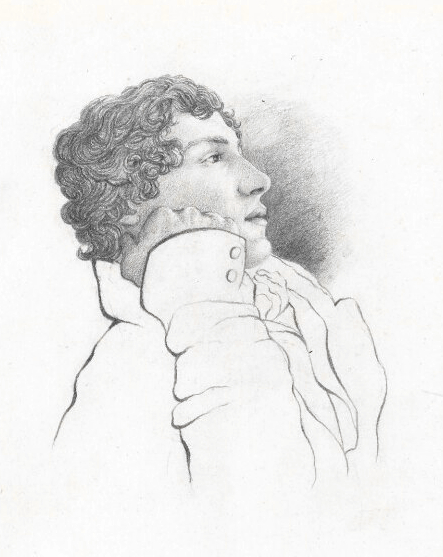
John Keats

This does not imply that poetry is illogical or lacks narration, but rather that poetry is an attempt to render the beautiful or sublime without the burden of engaging the logical or narrative thought-process. English Romantic poet John Keats termed this escape from logic "negative capability". This "romantic" approach views form as a key element of successful poetry because form is abstract and distinct from the underlying notional logic. This approach remained influential into the 20th century.

During the 18th and 19th centuries, there was also substantially more interaction among the various poetic traditions, in part due to the spread of European colonialism and the attendant rise in global trade. In addition to a boom in translation, during the Romantic period numerous ancient works were rediscovered.

=== 20th-century and 21st-century disputes ===
Some 20th-century literary theorists rely less on the ostensible opposition of prose and poetry, instead focusing on the poet as simply one who creates using language, and poetry as what the poet creates. The underlying concept of the poet as creator is not uncommon, and some modernist poets essentially do not distinguish between the creation of a poem with words, and creative acts in other media. Other modernists challenge the very attempt to define poetry as misguided.

The rejection of traditional forms and structures for poetry that began in the first half of the 20th century coincided with a questioning of the purpose and meaning of traditional definitions of poetry and of distinctions between poetry and prose, particularly given examples of poetic prose and prosaic poetry. Numerous modernist poets have written in non-traditional forms or in what traditionally would have been considered prose, although their writing was generally infused with poetic diction and often with rhythm and tone established by non-metrical means. While there was a substantial formalist reaction within the modernist schools to the breakdown of structure, this reaction focused as much on the development of new formal structures and syntheses as on the revival of older forms and structures.

Postmodernism goes beyond modernism's emphasis on the creative role of the poet, to emphasize the role of the reader of a text (hermeneutics), and to highlight the complex cultural web within which a poem is read. Today, throughout the world, poetry often incorporates poetic form and diction from other cultures and from the past, further confounding attempts at definition and classification that once made sense within a tradition such as the Western canon.

The early 21st-century poetic tradition appears to continue to strongly orient itself to earlier precursor poetic traditions such as those initiated by Whitman, Emerson, and Wordsworth. The literary critic Geoffrey Hartman (1929–2016) used the phrase "the anxiety of demand" to describe the contemporary response to older poetic traditions as "being fearful that the fact no longer has a form", building on a trope introduced by Emerson. Emerson had maintained that in the debate concerning poetic structure where either "form" or "fact" could predominate, that one need simply "Ask the fact for the form." This has been challenged at various levels by other literary scholars such as Harold Bloom (1930–2019), who has stated: "The generation of poets who stand together now, mature and ready to write the major American verse of the twenty-first century, may yet be seen as what Stevens called 'a great shadow's last embellishment,' the shadow being Emerson's."

In the 2020s, advances in artificial intelligence (AI), particularly large language models, enabled the generation of poetry in specific styles and formats. A 2024 study found that AI-generated poems were rated by non-expert readers as more rhythmic, beautiful, and human-like than those written by well-known human authors. This preference may stem from the relative simplicity and accessibility of AI-generated poetry, which some participants found easier to understand.

== Elements ==
=== Prosody ===
Prosody is the study of the meter, rhythm, and intonation of a poem. Rhythm and meter are different, although closely related. Meter is the definitive pattern established for a verse (such as iambic pentameter), while rhythm is the actual sound that results from a line of poetry. Prosody also may be used more specifically to refer to the scanning of poetic lines to show meter.

==== Rhythm ====
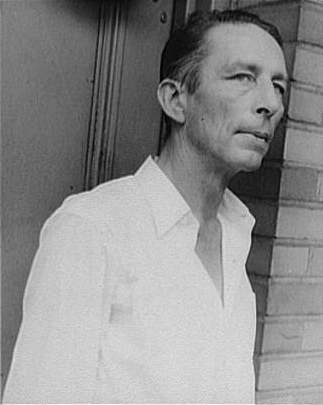
Robinson Jeffers

The methods for creating poetic rhythm vary across languages and between poetic traditions. Languages are often described as having timing set primarily by accents, syllables, or moras, depending on how rhythm is established, although a language can be influenced by multiple approaches. Japanese is a mora-timed language. Latin, Catalan, French, Leonese, Galician and Spanish are called syllable-timed languages. Stress-timed languages include English, Russian and, generally, German. Varying intonation also affects how rhythm is perceived. Languages can rely on either pitch or tone. Some languages with a pitch accent are Vedic Sanskrit or Ancient Greek. Tonal languages include Chinese, Vietnamese and most Subsaharan languages.

Metrical rhythm generally involves precise arrangements of stresses or syllables into repeated patterns called feet within a line. In Modern English verse the pattern of stresses primarily differentiate feet, so rhythm based on meter in Modern English is most often founded on the pattern of stressed and unstressed syllables (alone or elided). In the classical languages, on the other hand, while the metrical units are similar, vowel length rather than stresses define the meter. Old English poetry used a metrical pattern involving varied numbers of syllables but a fixed number of strong stresses in each line.

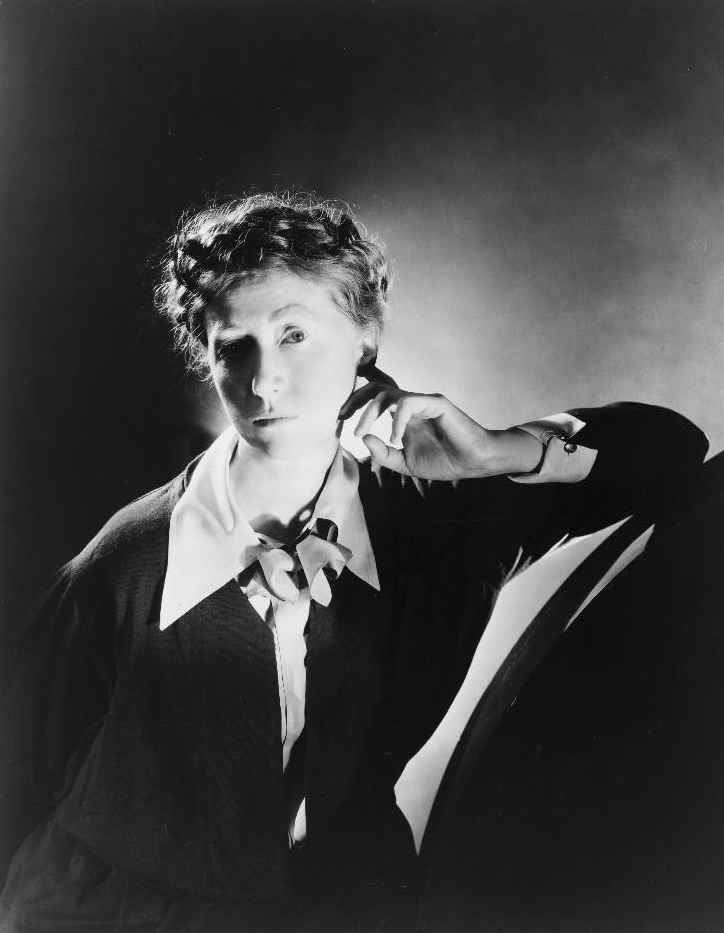
Marianne Moore

The chief device of ancient Hebrew Biblical poetry, including many of the psalms, was parallelism, a rhetorical structure in which successive lines reflected each other in grammatical structure, sound structure, notional content, or all three. Parallelism lent itself to antiphonal or call-and-response performance, which could also be reinforced by intonation. Thus, Biblical poetry relies much less on metrical feet to create rhythm, but instead creates rhythm based on much larger sound units of lines, phrases and sentences. Some classical poetry forms, such as Venpa of the Tamil language, had rigid grammars (to the point that they could be expressed as a context-free grammar) which ensured a rhythm.

Classical Chinese poetics, based on the tone system of Middle Chinese, recognized two kinds of tones: the level (平 píng) tone and the oblique (仄 zè) tones, a category consisting of the rising (上 sháng) tone, the departing (去 qù) tone and the entering (入 rù) tone. Certain forms of poetry placed constraints on which syllables were required to be level and which oblique.

The formal patterns of meter used in Modern English verse to create rhythm no longer dominate contemporary English poetry. In the case of free verse, rhythm is often organized based on looser units of cadence rather than a regular meter. Robinson Jeffers, Marianne Moore, and William Carlos Williams are three notable poets who reject the idea that regular accentual meter is critical to English poetry. Jeffers experimented with sprung rhythm as an alternative to accentual rhythm.

==== Meter ====
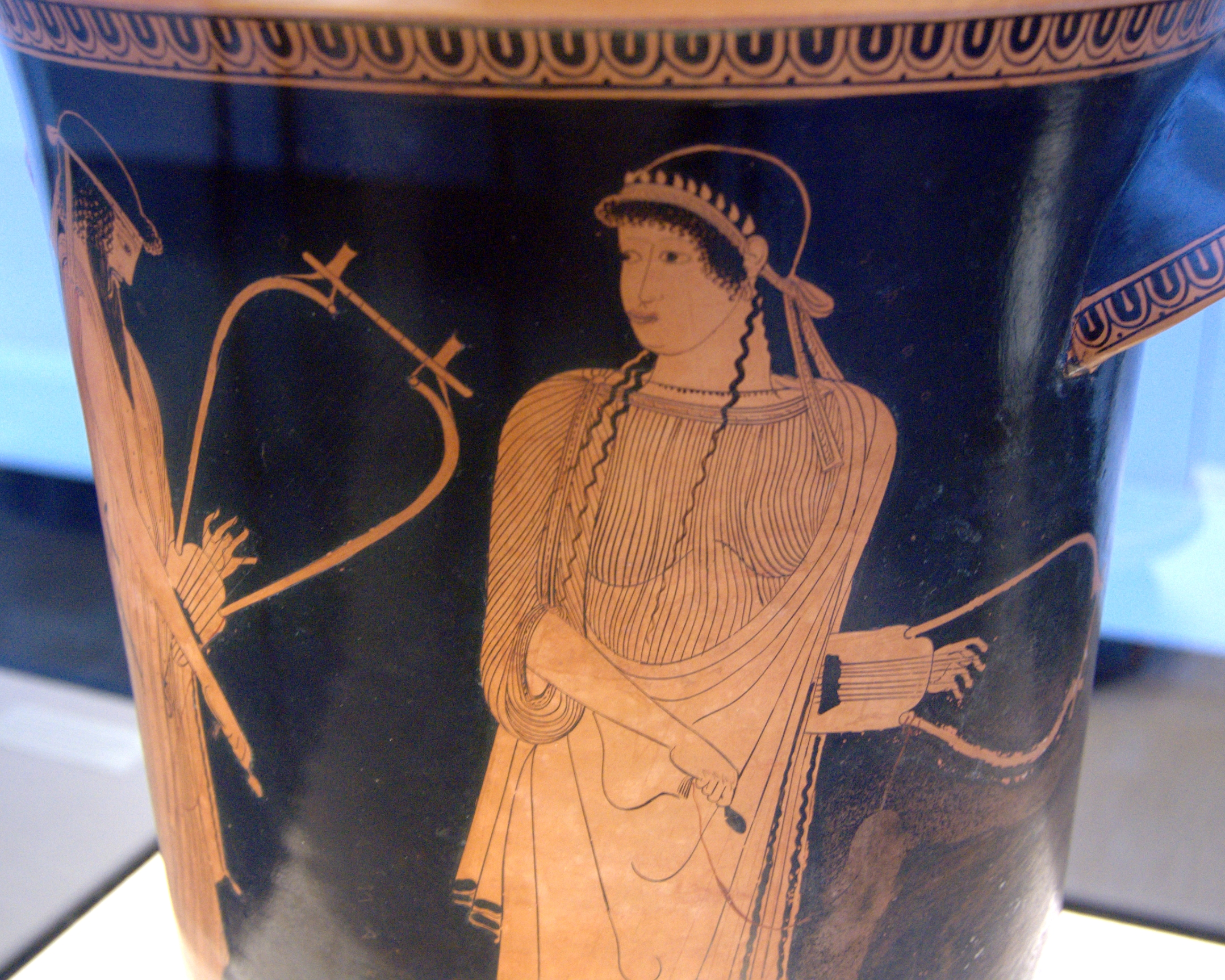
Attic red-figure kathalos painting of Sappho from c. 470 BCE

In the Western poetic tradition, meters are customarily grouped according to a characteristic metrical foot and the number of feet per line. The number of metrical feet in a line are described using Greek terminology: tetrameter for four feet and hexameter for six feet, for example. Thus, "iambic pentameter" is a meter comprising five feet per line, in which the predominant kind of foot is the "iamb". This metric system originated in ancient Greek poetry, and was used by poets such as Pindar and Sappho, and by the great tragedians of Athens. Similarly, "dactylic hexameter", comprises six feet per line, of which the dominant kind of foot is the "dactyl". Dactylic hexameter was the traditional meter of Greek epic poetry, the earliest extant examples of which are the works of Homer and Hesiod. Iambic pentameter and dactylic hexameter were later used by a number of poets, including William Shakespeare and Henry Wadsworth Longfellow, respectively. The most common metrical feet in English are:

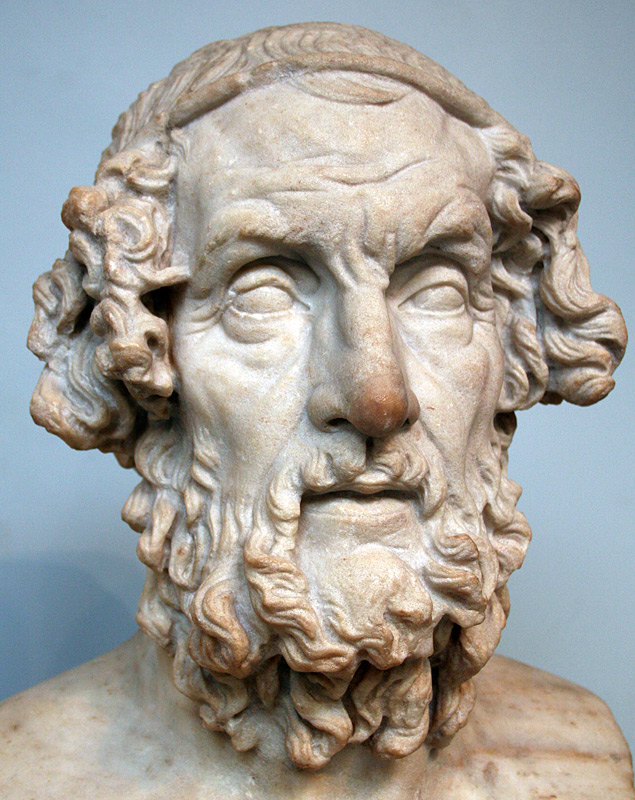
Homer: Roman bust, based on Greek original

- iamb – one unstressed syllable followed by a stressed syllable (e.g. des-cribe, in-clude, re-tract)
- trochee—one stressed syllable followed by an unstressed syllable (e.g. pic-ture, flow-er)
- dactyl – one stressed syllable followed by two unstressed syllables (e.g. an-no-tate, sim-i-lar)
- anapaest—two unstressed syllables followed by one stressed syllable (e.g. com-pre-hend)
- spondee—two stressed syllables together (e.g. heart-beat, four-teen)
- pyrrhic—two unstressed syllables together (rare, usually used to end dactylic hexameter)

There are a wide range of names for other types of feet, right up to a choriamb, a four syllable metric foot with a stressed syllable followed by two unstressed syllables and closing with a stressed syllable. The choriamb is derived from some ancient Greek and Latin poetry. Languages which use vowel length or intonation rather than or in addition to syllabic accents in determining meter, such as Ottoman Turkish or Vedic, often have concepts similar to the iamb and dactyl to describe common combinations of long and short sounds.

Each of these types of feet has a certain "feel," whether alone or in combination with other feet. The iamb, for example, is the most natural form of rhythm in the English language, and generally produces a subtle but stable verse. Scanning meter can often show the basic or fundamental pattern underlying a verse, but does not show the varying degrees of stress, as well as the differing pitches and lengths of syllables.

There is debate over how useful a multiplicity of different "feet" is in describing meter. For example, Robert Pinsky has argued that while dactyls are important in classical verse, English dactylic verse uses dactyls very irregularly and can be better described based on patterns of iambs and anapests, feet which he considers natural to the language. Actual rhythm is significantly more complex than the basic scanned meter described above, and many scholars have sought to develop systems that would scan such complexity. Vladimir Nabokov noted that overlaid on top of the regular pattern of stressed and unstressed syllables in a line of verse was a separate pattern of accents resulting from the natural pitch of the spoken words, and suggested that the term "scud" be used to distinguish an unaccented stress from an accented stress.

Sanskrit poetry is organized according to chhandas, which are manifold and continue to influence several South Asian languages' poetry.

==== Metrical patterns ====
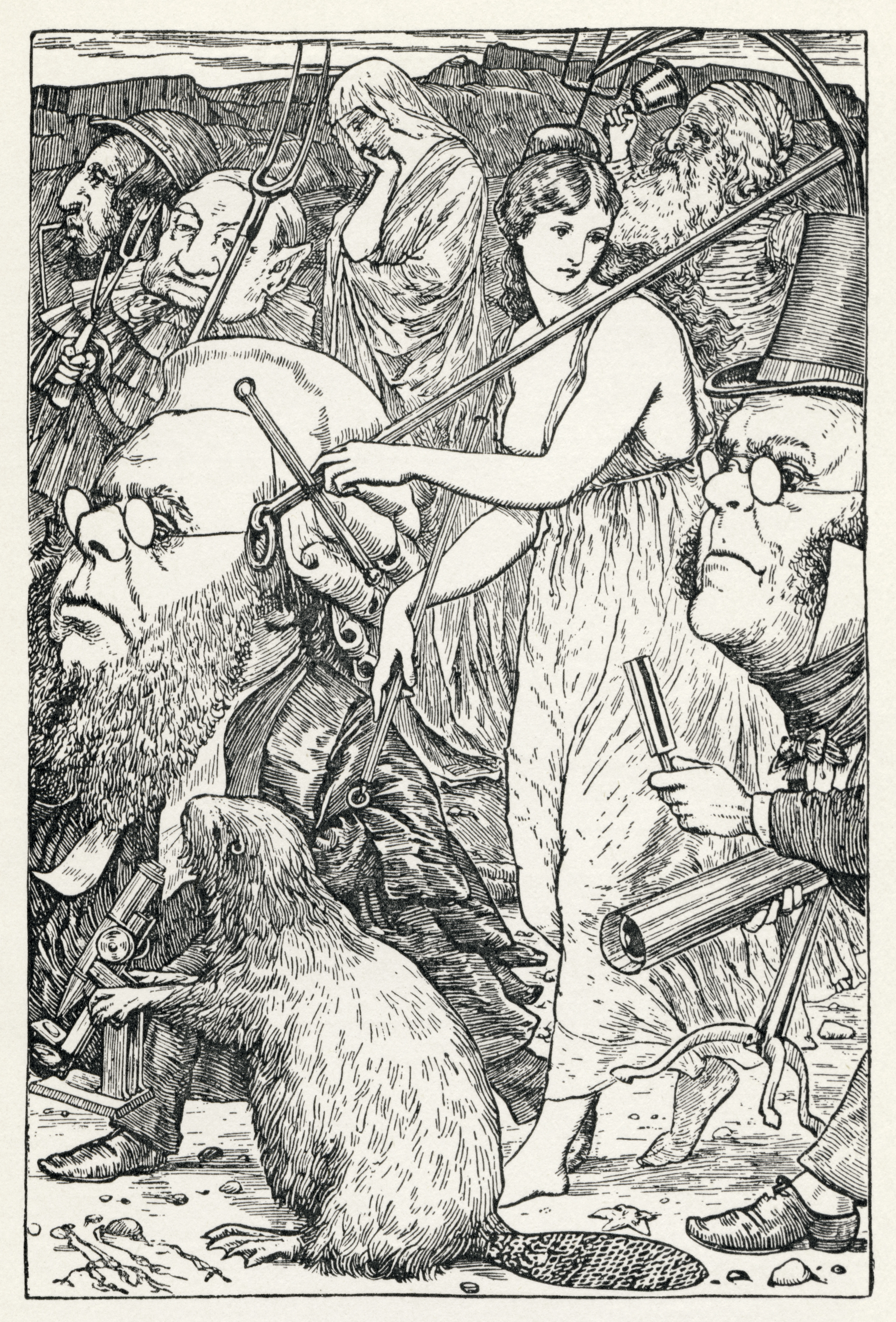
Lewis Carroll's The Hunting of the Snark (1876) is mainly in anapestic tetrameter.

Different traditions and genres of poetry tend to use different meters, ranging from the Shakespearean iambic pentameter and the Homeric dactylic hexameter to the anapestic tetrameter used in many nursery rhymes. However, a number of variations to the established meter are common, both to provide emphasis or attention to a given foot or line and to avoid boring repetition. For example, the stress in a foot may be inverted, a caesura (or pause) may be added (sometimes in place of a foot or stress), or the final foot in a line may be given a feminine ending to soften it or be replaced by a spondee to emphasize it and create a hard stop. Some patterns (such as iambic pentameter) tend to be fairly regular, while other patterns, such as dactylic hexameter, tend to be highly irregular. Regularity can vary between language. In addition, different patterns often develop distinctively in different languages, so that, for example, iambic tetrameter in Russian will generally reflect a regularity in the use of accents to reinforce the meter, which does not occur, or occurs to a much lesser extent, in English.

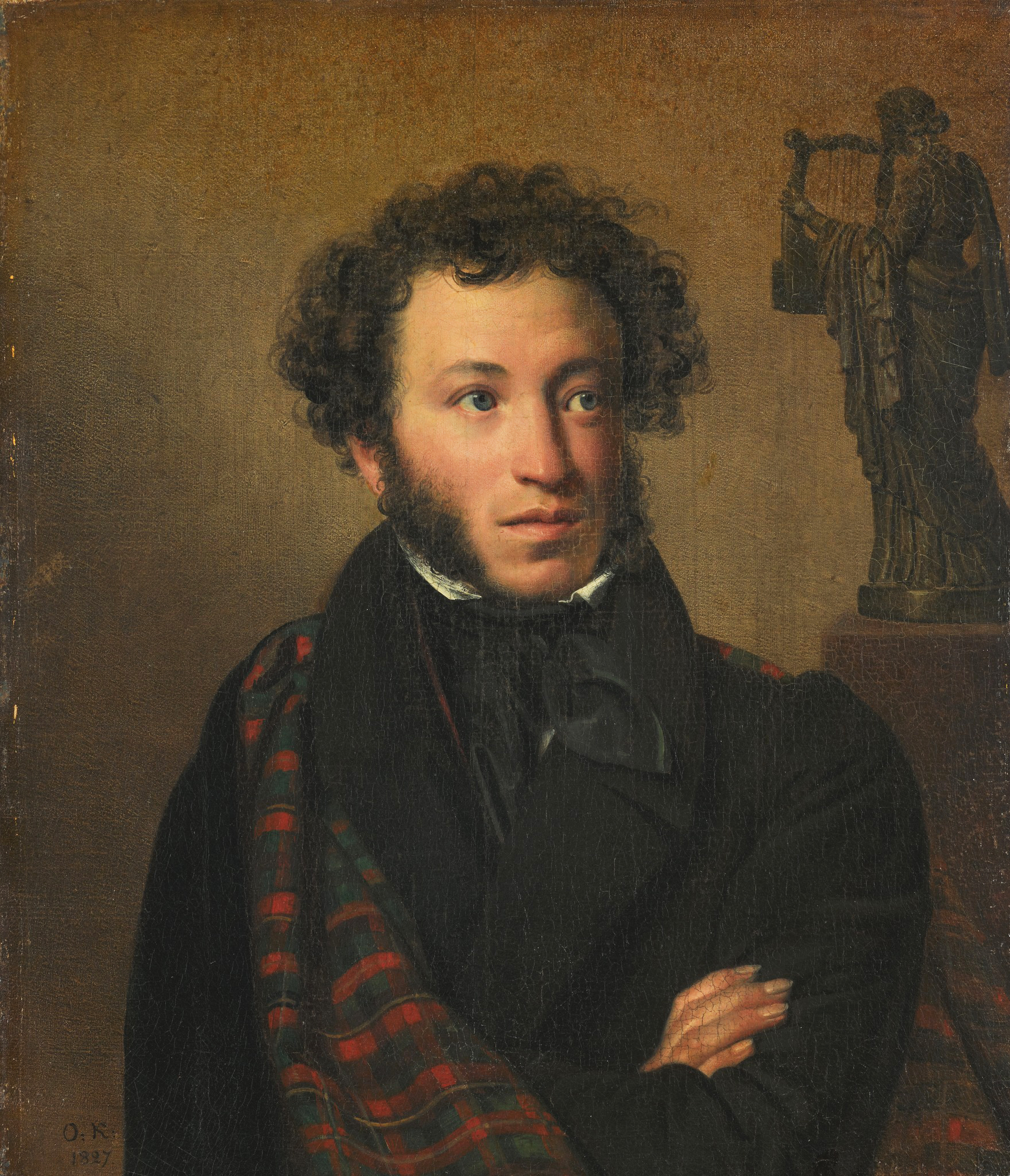
Alexander Pushkin

Some common metrical patterns, with notable examples of poets and poems who use them, include:

- Iambic pentameter (John Milton, Paradise Lost; William Shakespeare, Sonnets)
- Dactylic hexameter (Homer, Iliad; Virgil, Aeneid)
- Iambic tetrameter (Andrew Marvell, "To His Coy Mistress"; Alexander Pushkin, Eugene Onegin; Robert Frost, Stopping by Woods on a Snowy Evening)
- Trochaic octameter (Edgar Allan Poe, "The Raven")
- Trochaic tetrameter (Henry Wadsworth Longfellow, The Song of Hiawatha; the Finnish national epic, The Kalevala, is also in trochaic tetrameter, the natural rhythm of Finnish and Estonian)
- Alexandrin (Jean Racine, Phèdre)

=== Rhyme, alliteration, assonance ===
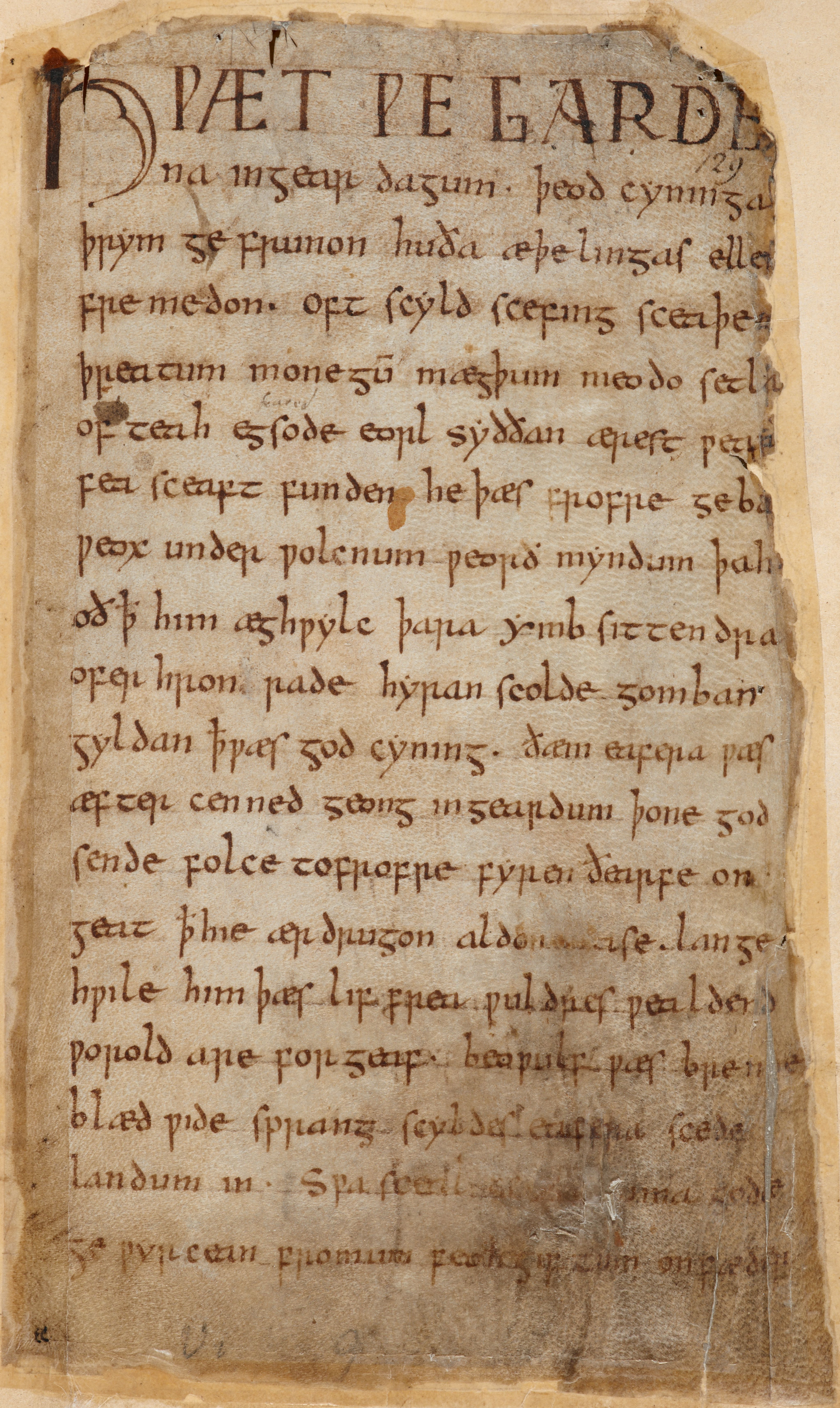
The Old English epic poem Beowulf is in alliterative verse.

Rhyme, alliteration, assonance and consonance are ways of creating repetitive patterns of sound. They may be used as an independent structural element in a poem, to reinforce rhythmic patterns, or as an ornamental element. They can also carry a meaning separate from the repetitive sound patterns created. For example, Chaucer used heavy alliteration to mock Old English verse and to paint a character as archaic.

Rhyme consists of identical ("hard-rhyme") or similar ("soft-rhyme") sounds placed at the ends of lines or at locations within lines ("internal rhyme"). Languages vary in the richness of their rhyming structures; Italian, for example, has a rich rhyming structure permitting maintenance of a limited set of rhymes throughout a lengthy poem. The richness results from word endings that follow regular forms. English, with its irregular word endings adopted from other languages, is less rich in rhyme. The degree of richness of a language's rhyming structures plays a substantial role in determining what poetic forms are commonly used in that language.

Alliteration is the repetition of letters or letter-sounds at the beginning of two or more words immediately succeeding each other, or at short intervals; or the recurrence of the same letter in accented parts of words. Alliteration and assonance played a key role in structuring early Germanic, Norse and Old English forms of poetry. The alliterative patterns of early Germanic poetry interweave meter and alliteration as a key part of their structure, so that the metrical pattern determines when the listener expects instances of alliteration to occur. This can be compared to an ornamental use of alliteration in most Modern European poetry, where alliterative patterns are not formal or carried through full stanzas. Alliteration is particularly useful in languages with less rich rhyming structures.

Assonance, where the use of similar vowel sounds within a word rather than similar sounds at the beginning or end of a word, was widely used in skaldic poetry but goes back to the Homeric epic. Because verbs carry much of the pitch in the English language, assonance can loosely evoke the tonal elements of Chinese poetry and so is useful in translating Chinese poetry. Consonance occurs where a consonant sound is repeated throughout a sentence without putting the sound only at the front of a word. Consonance provokes a more subtle effect than alliteration and so is less useful as a structural element.

==== Rhyming schemes ====
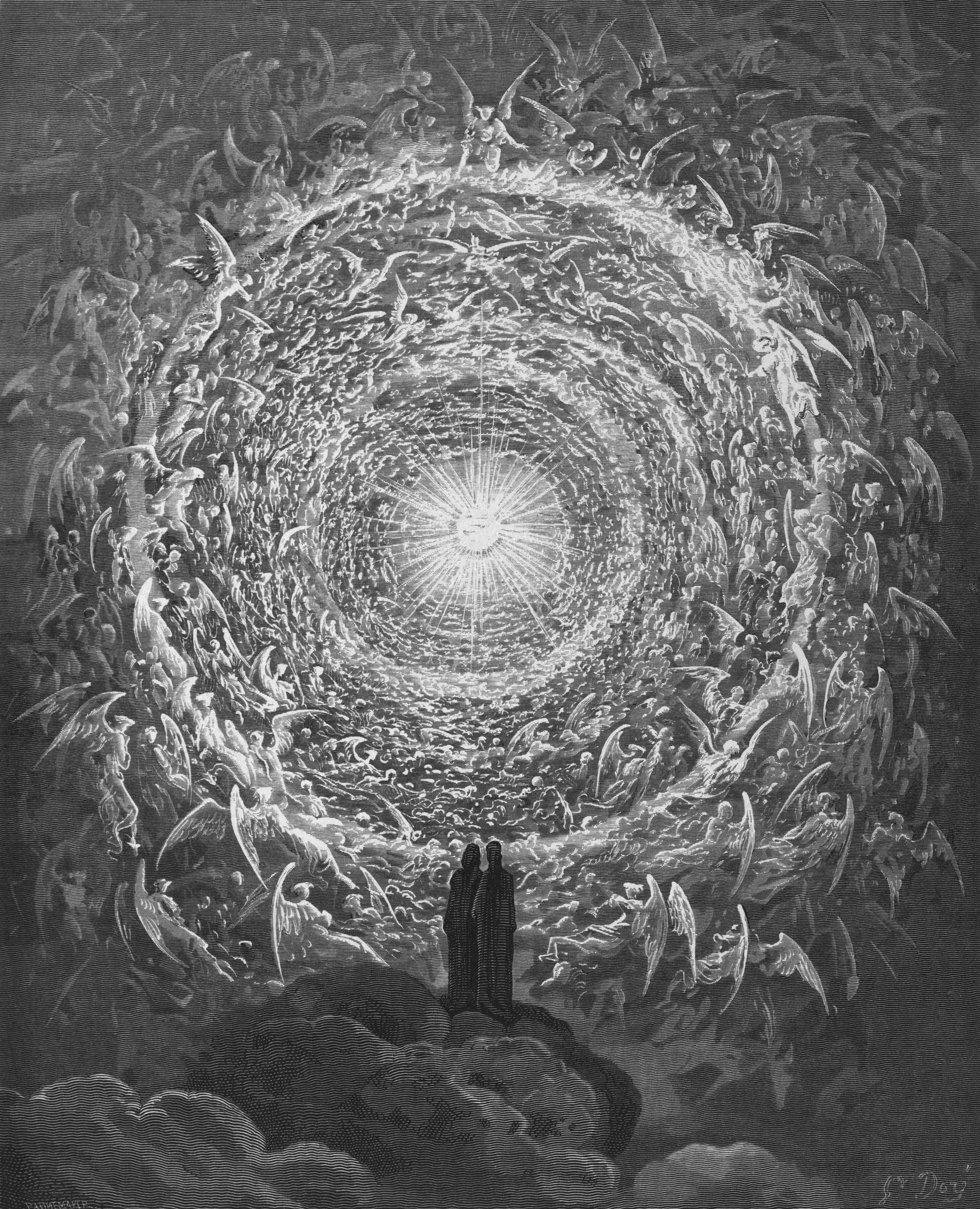
Divine Comedy: Dante and Beatrice see God as a point of light.

In many languages, including Arabic and modern European languages, poets use rhyme in set patterns as a structural element for specific poetic forms, such as ballads, sonnets and rhyming couplets. However, the use of structural rhyme is not universal even within the European tradition. Much modern poetry avoids traditional rhyme schemes. Classical Greek and Latin poetry did not use rhyme. Rhyme entered European poetry in the High Middle Ages, due to the influence of the Arabic language in Al Andalus. Arabic language poets used rhyme extensively not only with the development of literary Arabic in the sixth century, but also with the much older oral poetry, as in their long, rhyming qasidas. Some rhyming schemes have become associated with a specific language, culture or period, while other rhyming schemes have achieved use across languages, cultures or time periods. Some forms of poetry carry a consistent and well-defined rhyming scheme, such as the chant royal or the rubaiyat, while other poetic forms have variable rhyme schemes.

Most rhyme schemes are described using letters that correspond to sets of rhymes, so if the first, second and fourth lines of a quatrain rhyme with each other and the third line do not rhyme, the quatrain is said to have an AA BA rhyme scheme. This rhyme scheme is the one used, for example, in the rubaiyat form. Similarly, an A BB A quatrain (what is known as "enclosed rhyme") is used in such forms as the Petrarchan sonnet. Some types of more complicated rhyming schemes have developed names of their own, separate from the "a-bc" convention, such as the ottava rima and terza rima. The types and use of differing rhyming schemes are discussed further in the main article.

=== Form in poetry ===
Poetic form is more flexible in modernist and post-modernist poetry and continues to be less structured than in previous literary eras. Many modern poets eschew recognizable structures or forms and write in free verse. Free verse is, however, not "formless" but composed of a series of more subtle, more flexible prosodic elements. Thus poetry remains, in all its styles, distinguished from prose by form; some regard for basic formal structures of poetry will be found in all varieties of free verse, however much such structures may appear to have been ignored. Similarly, in the best poetry written in classic styles there will be departures from strict form for emphasis or effect.

Among major structural elements used in poetry are the line, the stanza or verse paragraph, and larger combinations of stanzas or lines such as cantos. Also sometimes used are broader visual presentations of words and calligraphy. These basic units of poetic form are often combined into larger structures, called poetic forms or poetic modes (see the following section), as in the sonnet.

==== Lines and stanzas ====
Poetry is often separated into lines on a page, in a process known as lineation. These lines may be based on the number of metrical feet or may emphasize a rhyming pattern at the ends of lines. Lines may serve other functions, particularly where the poem is not written in a formal metrical pattern. Lines can separate, compare or contrast thoughts expressed in different units, or can highlight a change in tone. See the article on line breaks for information about the division between lines.

Lines of poems are often organized into stanzas, which are denominated by the number of lines included. Thus a collection of two lines is a couplet (or distich), three lines a triplet (or tercet), four lines a quatrain, and so on. These lines may or may not relate to each other by rhyme or rhythm. For example, a couplet may be two lines with identical meters which rhyme or two lines held together by a common meter alone.

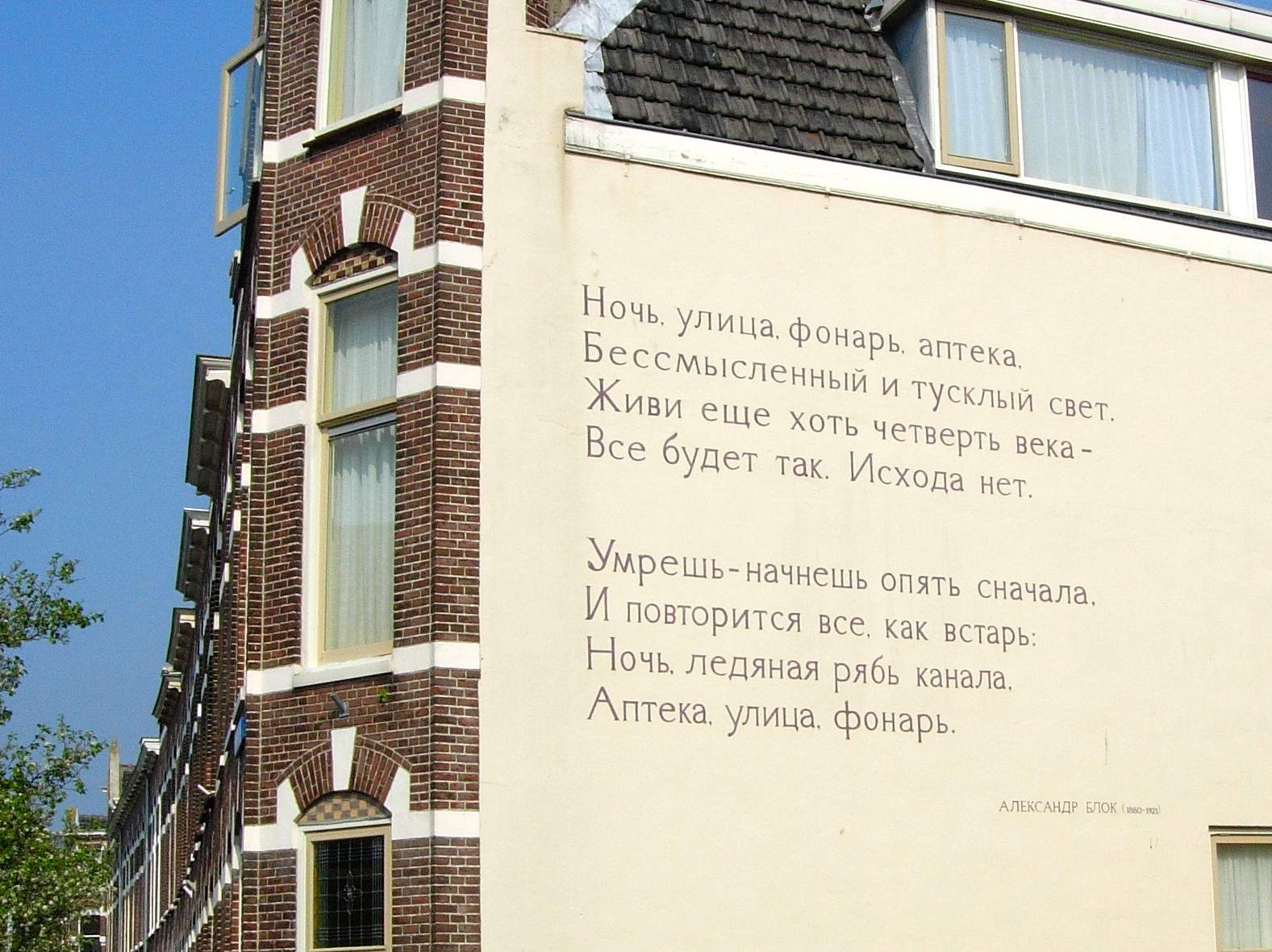
Blok's Russian poem, "Noch, ulitsa, fonar, apteka" ("Night, street, lamp, drugstore"), on a wall in Leiden

Other poems may be organized into verse paragraphs, in which regular rhymes with established rhythms are not used, but the poetic tone is instead established by a collection of rhythms, alliterations, and rhymes established in paragraph form. Many medieval poems were written in verse paragraphs, even where regular rhymes and rhythms were used.

In many forms of poetry, stanzas are interlocking, so that the rhyming scheme or other structural elements of one stanza determine those of succeeding stanzas. Examples of such interlocking stanzas include, for example, the ghazal and the villanelle, where a refrain (or, in the case of the villanelle, refrains) is established in the first stanza which then repeats in subsequent stanzas. Related to the use of interlocking stanzas is their use to separate thematic parts of a poem. For example, the strophe, antistrophe and epode of the ode form are often separated into one or more stanzas.

In some cases, particularly lengthier formal poetry such as some forms of epic poetry, stanzas themselves are constructed according to strict rules and then combined. In skaldic poetry, the dróttkvætt stanza had eight lines, each having three "lifts" produced with alliteration or assonance. In addition to two or three alliterations, the odd-numbered lines had partial rhyme of consonants with dissimilar vowels, not necessarily at the beginning of the word; the even lines contained internal rhyme in set syllables (not necessarily at the end of the word). Each half-line had exactly six syllables, and each line ended in a trochee. The arrangement of dróttkvætts followed far less rigid rules than the construction of the individual dróttkvætts.

==== Visual presentation ====
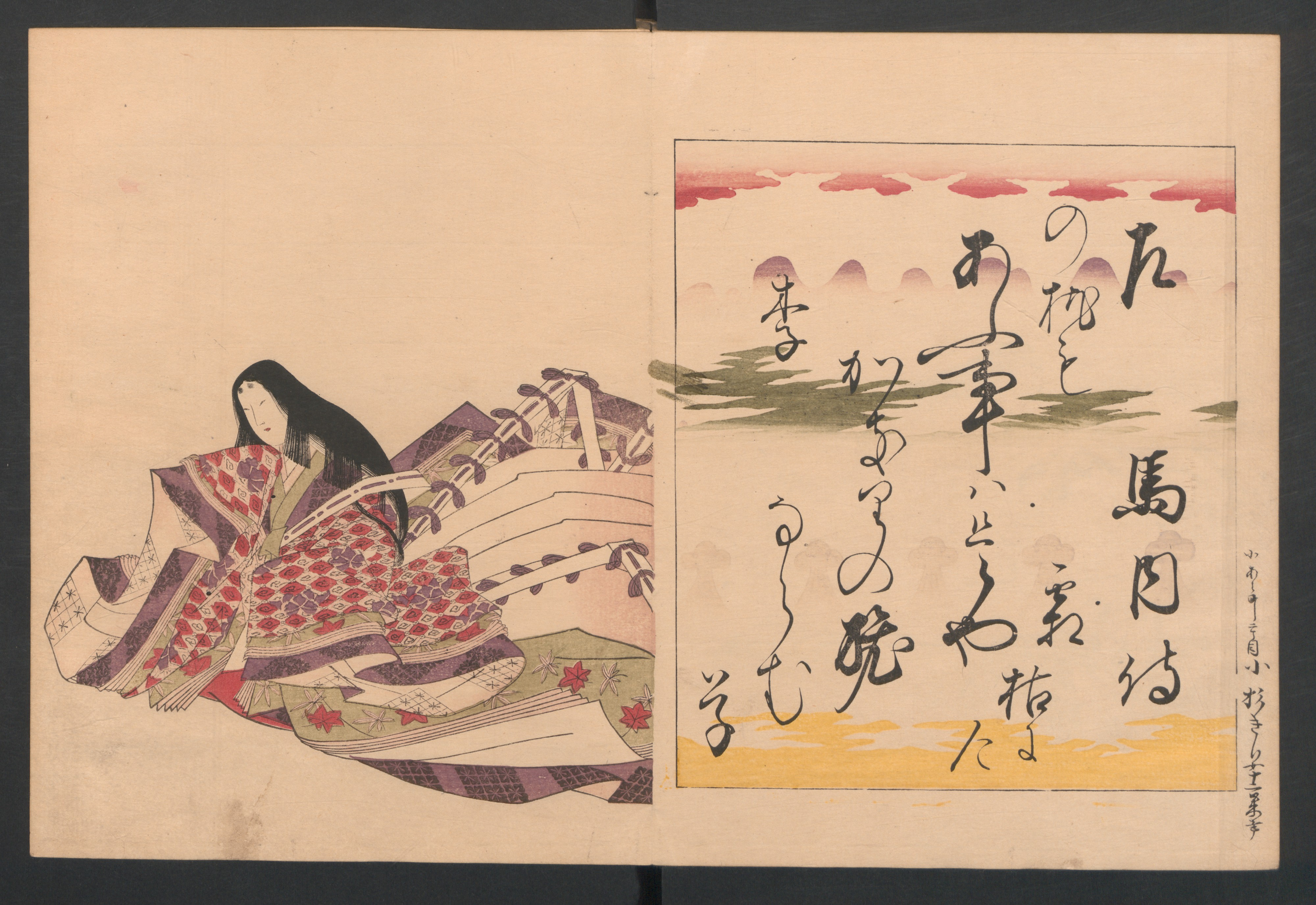
Poetry is often written down in verse, writing structures that echo the poetic structure. This poem by Uma no Naishi is written in chirashigaki (scattered writing). The characters are deliberately written out of order. The first part of the poem is written in the third column from the right, while the second column from the right comes later in the poem. Chirashigaki may also retain the order, but divide and space the characters unconventionally, with a column break partway through a poetic line or a word. This slows and delinearizes the reading process, changing the read rhythm. It was also a convenient way of using expensive letter paper efficiently.

Even before the advent of printing, the visual appearance of poetry often added meaning or depth. Acrostic poems conveyed meanings in the initial letters of lines or in letters at other specific places in a poem. In Arabic, Hebrew and Chinese poetry, the visual presentation of finely calligraphed poems has played an important part in the overall effect of many poems.

With the advent of printing, poets gained greater control over the mass-produced visual presentations of their work. Visual elements have become an important part of the poet's toolbox, and many poets have sought to use visual presentation for a wide range of purposes. Some Modernist poets have made the placement of individual lines or groups of lines on the page an integral part of the poem's composition. At times, this complements the poem's rhythm through visual caesuras of various lengths, or creates juxtapositions so as to accentuate meaning, ambiguity or irony, or simply to create an aesthetically pleasing form. In its most extreme form, this can lead to concrete poetry or asemic writing.

=== Diction ===
Poetic diction treats the manner in which language is used, and refers not only to the sound but also to the underlying meaning and its interaction with sound and form. Many languages and poetic forms have very specific poetic dictions, to the point where distinct grammars and dialects are used specifically for poetry. Registers in poetry can range from strict employment of ordinary speech patterns, as favoured in much late-20th-century prosody, through to highly ornate uses of language, as in medieval and Renaissance poetry.

Poetic diction can include rhetorical devices such as simile and metaphor, as well as tones of voice, such as irony. Aristotle wrote in the Poetics that "the greatest thing by far is to be a master of metaphor." Since the rise of Modernism, some poets have opted for a poetic diction that de-emphasizes rhetorical devices, attempting instead the direct presentation of things and experiences and the exploration of tone. On the other hand, Surrealists have pushed rhetorical devices to their limits, making frequent use of catachresis.

Allegorical stories are central to the poetic diction of many cultures, and were prominent in the West during classical times, the late Middle Ages and the Renaissance. Aesop's Fables, repeatedly rendered in both verse and prose since first being recorded about 500 BCE, are perhaps the richest single source of allegorical poetry through the ages. Other notables examples include the Roman de la Rose, a 13th-century French poem, William Langland's Piers Ploughman in the 14th century, and Jean de la Fontaine's Fables (influenced by Aesop's) in the 17th century. Rather than being fully allegorical, however, a poem may contain symbols or allusions that deepen the meaning or effect of its words without constructing a full allegory.

Another element of poetic diction can be the use of vivid imagery for effect. The juxtaposition of unexpected or impossible images is, for example, a particularly strong element in surrealist poetry and haiku. Vivid images are often endowed with symbolism or metaphor. Many poetic dictions use repetitive phrases for effect, either a short phrase (such as Homer's "rosy-fingered dawn" or "the wine-dark sea") or a longer refrain. Such repetition can add a somber tone to a poem, or can be laced with irony as the context of the words changes.

== Forms ==
Specific poetic forms have been developed by many cultures. In more developed, closed or "received" poetic forms, the rhyming scheme, meter and other elements of a poem are based on sets of rules, ranging from the relatively loose rules that govern the construction of an elegy to the highly formalized structure of the ghazal or villanelle. Described below are some common forms of poetry widely used across a number of languages. Additional forms of poetry may be found in the discussions of the poetry of particular cultures or periods and in the glossary.

=== Sonnet ===
William Shakespeare

Among the most common forms of poetry, popular from the Late Middle Ages on, is the sonnet, which by the 13th century had become standardized as fourteen lines following a set rhyme scheme and logical structure. By the 14th century and the Italian Renaissance, the form had further crystallized under the pen of Petrarch, whose sonnets were translated in the 16th century by Sir Thomas Wyatt, who is credited with introducing the sonnet form into English literature. A traditional Italian or Petrarchan sonnet follows the rhyme scheme $\mathrm{ABBA,ABBA,CDECDE}$, though some variation, perhaps the most common being $\mathrm{CDCDCD}$, especially within the final six lines (or sestet), is common. The English (or Shakespearean) sonnet follows the rhyme scheme $\mathrm{ABAB \,\, CDCD \,\, EFEF \,\, GG}$, introducing a third quatrain (grouping of four lines), a final couplet, and a greater amount of variety in rhyme than is usually found in its Italian predecessors. By convention, sonnets in English typically use iambic pentameter, while in the Romance languages, the hendecasyllable and Alexandrine are the most widely used meters.

Sonnets of all types often make use of a volta, or "turn," a point in the poem at which an idea is turned on its head, a question is answered (or introduced), or the subject matter is further complicated. This volta can often take the form of a "but" statement contradicting or complicating the content of the earlier lines. In the Petrarchan sonnet, the turn tends to fall around the division between the first two quatrains and the sestet, while English sonnets usually place it at or near the beginning of the closing couplet.

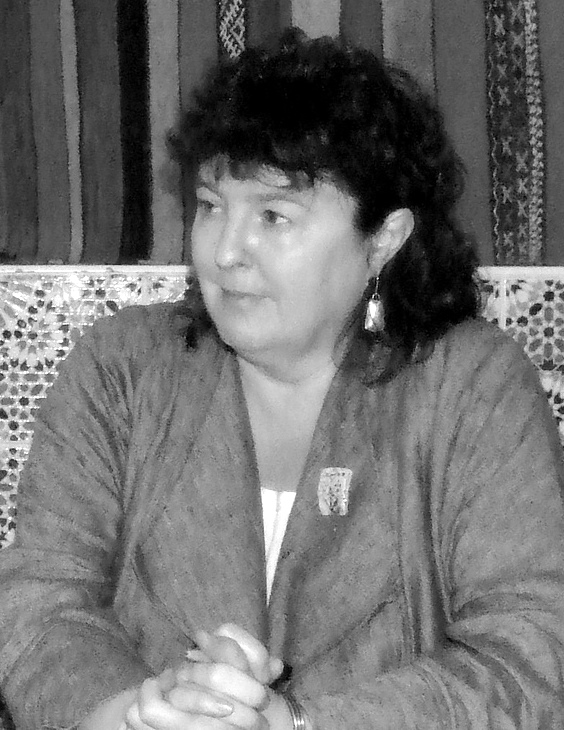
Carol Ann Duffy

Sonnets are particularly associated with high poetic diction, vivid imagery, and romantic love, largely due to the influence of Petrarch as well as of early English practitioners such as Edmund Spenser (who gave his name to the Spenserian sonnet), Michael Drayton, and Shakespeare, whose sonnets are among the most famous in English poetry, with twenty being included in the Oxford Book of English Verse. However, the twists and turns associated with the volta allow for a logical flexibility applicable to many subjects. Poets from the earliest centuries of the sonnet to the present have used the form to address topics related to politics (John Milton, Percy Bysshe Shelley, Claude McKay), theology (John Donne, Gerard Manley Hopkins), war (Wilfred Owen, E. E. Cummings), and gender and sexuality (Carol Ann Duffy). Further, postmodern authors such as Ted Berrigan and John Berryman have challenged the traditional definitions of the sonnet form, rendering entire sequences of "sonnets" that often lack rhyme, a clear logical progression, or even a consistent count of fourteen lines.

=== Shi ===
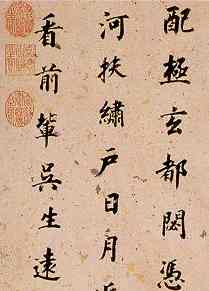
Du Fu, "On Visiting the Temple of Laozi"

Shi (simplified Chinese: 诗; traditional Chinese: 詩; pinyin: shī; Wade–Giles: shih) is the main type of Classical Chinese poetry. Within this form of poetry the most important variations are "folk song" styled verse (yuefu), "old style" verse (gushi), "modern style" verse (jintishi). In all cases, rhyming is obligatory. The Yuefu is a folk ballad or a poem written in the folk ballad style, and the number of lines and the length of the lines could be irregular. For the other variations of shi poetry, generally either a four line (quatrain, or jueju) or else an eight-line poem is normal; either way with the even numbered lines rhyming. The line length is scanned by an according number of characters (according to the convention that one character equals one syllable), and are predominantly either five or seven characters long, with a caesura before the final three syllables. The lines are generally end-stopped, considered as a series of couplets, and exhibit verbal parallelism as a key poetic device. The "old style" verse (Gushi) is less formally strict than the jintishi, or regulated verse, which, despite the name "new style" verse actually had its theoretical basis laid as far back as Shen Yue (441–513 CE), although not considered to have reached its full development until the time of Chen Zi'ang (661–702 CE). A good example of a poet known for his Gushi poems is Li Bai (701–762 CE). Among its other rules, the jintishi rules regulate the tonal variations within a poem, including the use of set patterns of the four tones of Middle Chinese. The basic form of jintishi (sushi) has eight lines in four couplets, with parallelism between the lines in the second and third couplets. The couplets with parallel lines contain contrasting content but an identical grammatical relationship between words. Jintishi often have a rich poetic diction, full of allusion, and can have a wide range of subject, including history and politics. One of the masters of the form was Du Fu (712–770 CE), who wrote during the Tang Dynasty (8th century).

=== Villanelle ===
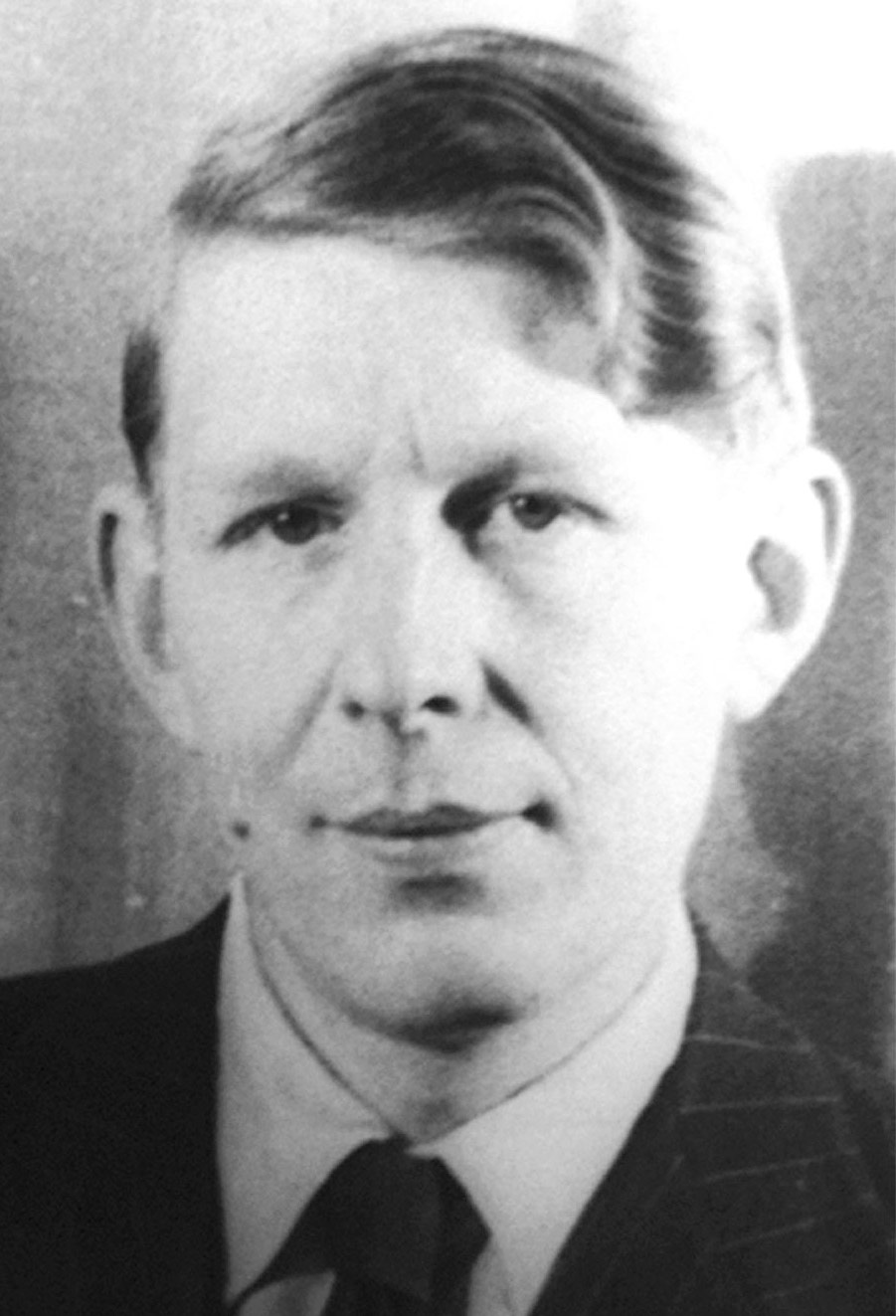
W. H. Auden

The villanelle is a nineteen-line poem made up of five triplets with a closing quatrain; the poem is characterized by having two refrains, initially used in the first and third lines of the first stanza, and then alternately used at the close of each subsequent stanza until the final quatrain, which is concluded by the two refrains. The remaining lines of the poem have an AB alternating rhyme. The villanelle has been used regularly in the English language since the late 19th century by such poets as Dylan Thomas, W. H. Auden, and Elizabeth Bishop.

=== Limerick ===
A limerick is a poem that consists of five lines and is often humorous. Rhythm is very important in limericks for the first, second and fifth lines must have seven to ten syllables. However, the third and fourth lines only need five to seven. Lines 1, 2 and 5 rhyme with each other, and lines 3 and 4 rhyme with each other. Practitioners of the limerick included Edward Lear, Lord Alfred Tennyson, Rudyard Kipling, Robert Louis Stevenson.

=== Tanka ===
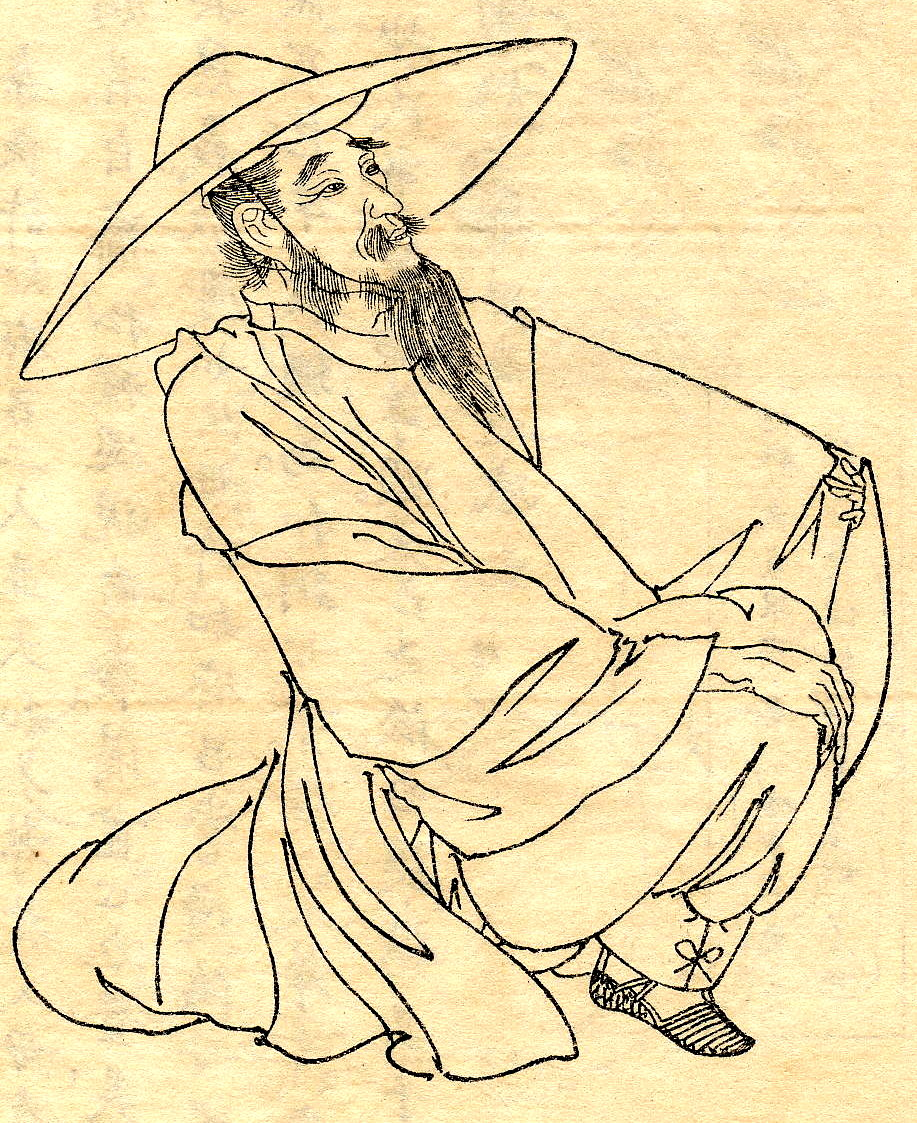
Kakinomoto no Hitomaro

Tanka is a form of unrhymed Japanese poetry, with five sections totalling 31 on (phonological units identical to morae), structured in a 5–7–5–7–7 pattern. There is generally a shift in tone and subject matter between the upper 5–7–5 phrase and the lower 7–7 phrase. Tanka were written as early as the Asuka period by such poets as Kakinomoto no Hitomaro (fl. late 7th century), at a time when Japan was emerging from a period where much of its poetry followed Chinese form. Tanka was originally the shorter form of Japanese formal poetry (which was generally referred to as "waka"), and was used more heavily to explore personal rather than public themes. By the tenth century, tanka had become the dominant form of Japanese poetry, to the point where the originally general term waka ("Japanese poetry") came to be used exclusively for tanka. Tanka are still widely written today.

=== Haiku ===
Haiku is a popular form of unrhymed Japanese poetry, which evolved in the 17th century from the hokku, or opening verse of a renku. Generally written in a single vertical line, the haiku contains three sections totalling 17 on (morae), structured in a 5–7–5 pattern. Traditionally, haiku contain a kireji, or cutting word, usually placed at the end of one of the poem's three sections, and a kigo, or season-word. The most famous exponent of the haiku was Matsuo Bashō (1644–1694). An example of his writing:

Japanese

富士の風
や扇にのせて
江戸土産

Rōmaji

fuji no kaze
ya oogi ni nosete
Edo miyage

English

the wind of Mt. Fuji
I've brought on my fan!
a gift from Edo

=== Khlong ===
The khlong (โคลง, [kʰlōːŋ]) is among the oldest Thai poetic forms. This is reflected in its requirements on the tone markings of certain syllables, which must be marked with mai ek (ไม้เอก, Thai pronunciation: [máj èːk], ◌่) or mai tho (ไม้โท, [máj tʰōː], ◌้). This was likely derived from when the Thai language had three tones (as opposed to today's five, a split which occurred during the Ayutthaya Kingdom period), two of which corresponded directly to the aforementioned marks. It is usually regarded as an advanced and sophisticated poetic form.

In khlong, a stanza (bot, บท, Thai pronunciation: [bòt]) has a number of lines (bat, บาท, Thai pronunciation: [bàːt], from Pali and Sanskrit pāda), depending on the type. The bat are subdivided into two wak (วรรค, Thai pronunciation: [wák], from Sanskrit varga). (Note: In literary studies, line in western poetry is translated as bat. However, in some forms, the unit is more equivalent to wak. To avoid confusion, this article will refer to wak and bat instead of line, which may refer to either.) The first wak has five syllables, the second has a variable number, also depending on the type, and may be optional. The type of khlong is named by the number of bat in a stanza; it may also be divided into two main types: khlong suphap (โคลงสุภาพ, [kʰlōːŋ sù.pʰâːp]) and khlong dan (โคลงดั้น, [kʰlōːŋ dân]). The two differ in the number of syllables in the second wak of the final bat and inter-stanza rhyming rules.

==== Khlong si suphap ====
The khlong si suphap (โคลงสี่สุภาพ, [kʰlōːŋ sìː sù.pʰâːp]) is the most common form still currently employed. It has four bat per stanza (si translates as four). The first wak of each bat has five syllables. The second wak has two or four syllables in the first and third bat, two syllables in the second, and four syllables in the fourth. Mai ek is required for seven syllables and Mai tho is required for four, as shown below. "Dead word" syllables are allowed in place of syllables which require mai ek, and changing the spelling of words to satisfy the criteria is usually acceptable.

=== Ode ===
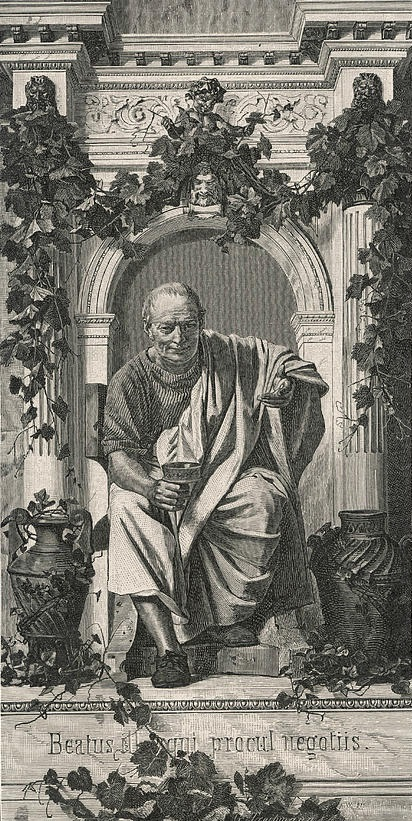
Horace

Odes were first developed by poets writing in ancient Greek, such as Pindar, and Latin, such as Horace. Forms of odes appear in many of the cultures that were influenced by the Greeks and Latins. The ode generally has three parts: a strophe, an antistrophe, and an epode. The strophe and the antistrophe of the ode possess similar metrical structures and, depending on the tradition, similar rhyme structures. In contrast, the epode is written with a different scheme and structure. Odes have a formal poetic diction and generally deal with a serious subject. The strophe and antistrophe look at the subject from different, often conflicting, perspectives, with the epode moving to a higher level to either view or resolve the underlying issues. Odes are often intended to be recited or sung by two choruses (or individuals), with the first reciting the strophe, the second the antistrophe, and both together the epode. Over time, differing forms for odes have developed with considerable variations in form and structure, but generally showing the original influence of the Pindaric or Horatian ode. One non-Western form which resembles the ode is the qasida in Arabic poetry.

=== Ghazal ===
Ghazal by Sa'di of Shiraz (13th century) from 19th century manuscript

The ghazal (also ghazel, gazel, gazal, or gozol) is a form of poetry common in Arabic, Bengali, Persian and Urdu. In classic form, the ghazal has from five to fifteen rhyming couplets that share a refrain at the end of the second line. This refrain may be of one or several syllables and is preceded by a rhyme. Each line has an identical meter and is of the same length. The ghazal often reflects on a theme of unattainable love or divinity.

As with other forms with a long history in many languages, many variations have been developed, including forms with a quasi-musical poetic diction in Urdu. Ghazals have a classical affinity with Sufism, and a number of major Sufi religious works are written in ghazal form. The relatively steady meter and the use of the refrain produce an incantatory effect, which complements Sufi mystical themes well. Among the masters of the form are Rumi, the celebrated 13th-century Persian poet, Attar, 12th century Iranian Sufi mystic poet who Rumi considered his master, and their equally famous near-contemporary Hafez. Hafez uses the ghazal to expose hypocrisy and the pitfalls of worldliness, but also expertly exploits the form to express the divine depths and secular subtleties of love; creating translations that meaningfully capture such complexities of content and form is immensely challenging, but lauded attempts to do so in English include Gertrude Bell's Poems from the Divan of Hafiz and Beloved: 81 poems from Hafez (Bloodaxe Books) whose Preface addresses in detail the problematic nature of translating ghazals and whose versions (according to Fatemeh Keshavarz, Roshan Institute for Persian Studies) preserve "that audacious and multilayered richness one finds in the originals". Indeed, Hafez's ghazals have been the subject of much analysis, commentary and interpretation, influencing post-fourteenth century Persian writing more than any other author. The West-östlicher Diwan of Johann Wolfgang von Goethe, a collection of lyrical poems, is inspired by the Persian poet Hafez.

== Genres ==
In addition to specific forms of poems, poetry is often thought of in terms of different genres and subgenres. A poetic genre is generally a tradition or classification of poetry based on the subject matter, style, or other broader literary characteristics. Some commentators view genres as natural forms of literature. Others view the study of genres as the study of how different works relate and refer to other works.

=== Narrative poetry ===
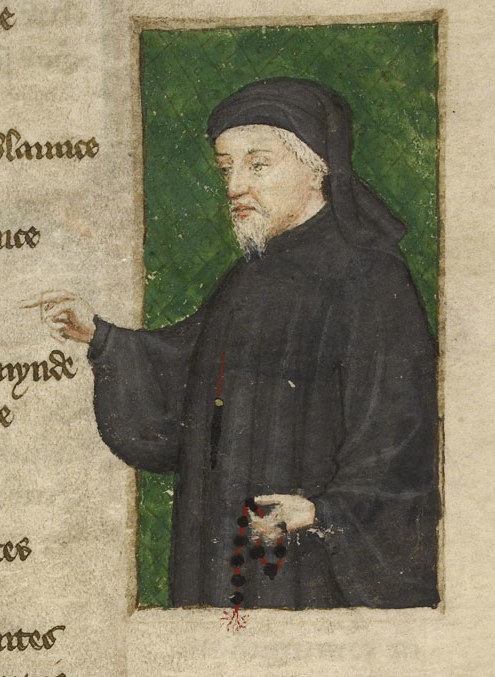
Chaucer

Narrative poetry is a genre of poetry that tells a story. Broadly it subsumes epic poetry, but the term "narrative poetry" is often reserved for smaller works, generally with more appeal to human interest. Narrative poetry may be the oldest type of poetry. Many scholars of Homer have concluded that his Iliad and Odyssey were composed of compilations of shorter narrative poems that related individual episodes.

Much narrative poetry—such as Scottish and English ballads, and Baltic and Slavic heroic poems—is performance poetry with roots in a preliterate oral tradition. It has been speculated that some features that distinguish poetry from prose, such as meter, alliteration and kennings, once served as memory aids for bards who recited traditional tales.

Notable narrative poets have included Ovid, Dante, Juan Ruiz, William Langland, Chaucer, Fernando de Rojas, Luís de Camões, Shakespeare, Alexander Pope, Robert Burns, Adam Mickiewicz, Alexander Pushkin, Letitia Elizabeth Landon, Edgar Allan Poe, Alfred Tennyson, and Anne Carson.

=== Lyric poetry ===
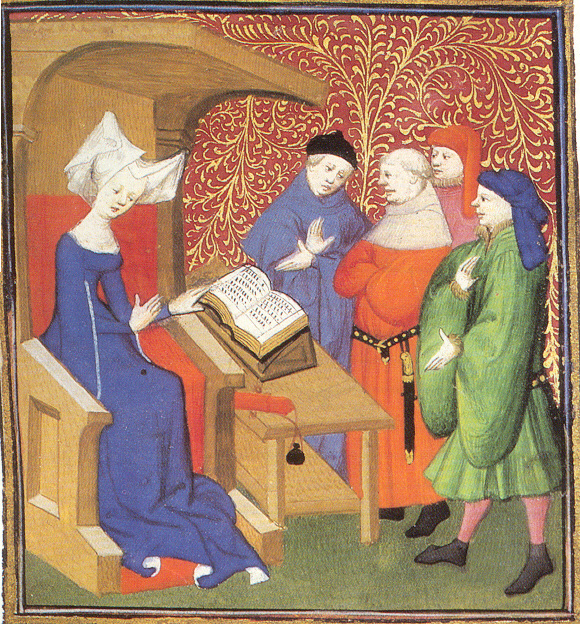
Christine de Pizan (left)

Lyric poetry is a genre that, unlike epic and dramatic poetry, does not attempt to tell a story but instead is of a more personal nature. Poems in this genre tend to be shorter, melodic, and contemplative. Rather than depicting characters and actions, it portrays the poet's own feelings, states of mind, and perceptions. Notable poets in this genre include Hafez, Christine de Pizan, John Donne, Charles Baudelaire, Gerard Manley Hopkins, Antonio Machado, and Edna St. Vincent Millay.

=== Epic poetry ===
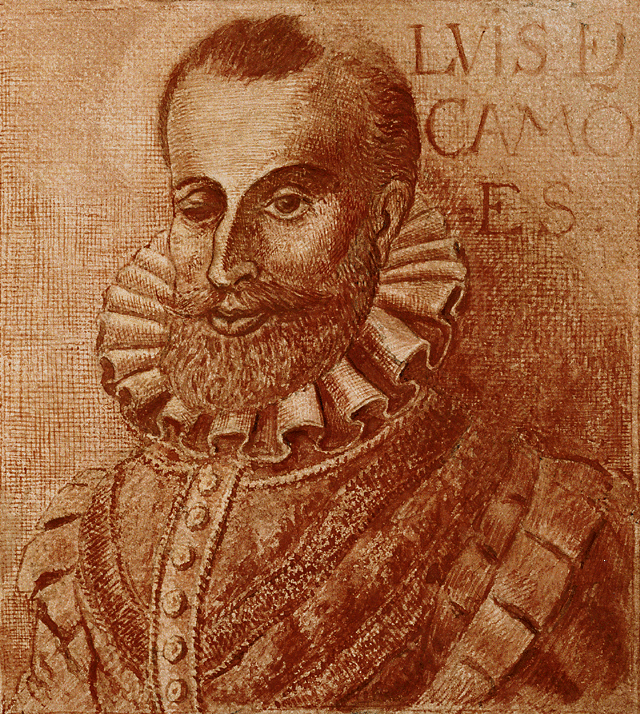
Camões

Epic poetry is a genre of poetry, and a major form of narrative literature. This genre is often defined as lengthy poems concerning events of a heroic or important nature to the culture of the time. It recounts, in a continuous narrative, the life and works of a heroic or mythological person or group of persons.

Examples of epic poems are Homer's Iliad and Odyssey, Virgil's Aeneid, the Nibelungenlied, Luís de Camões' Os Lusíadas, the Cantar de Mio Cid, the Epic of Gilgamesh, the Mahabharata, Lönnrot's Kalevala, Valmiki's Ramayana, Ferdowsi's Shahnama, Nizami (or Nezami)'s Khamse (Five Books), and the Epic of King Gesar. A Sanskrit analogue to the epic poem is the mahākāvya.

While the composition of epic poetry, and of long poems generally, became less common in the west after the early 20th century, some notable epics have continued to be written. The Cantos by Ezra Pound, Helen in Egypt by H.D., and Paterson by William Carlos Williams are examples of modern epics. Derek Walcott won a Nobel prize in 1992 to a great extent on the basis of his epic, Omeros.

=== Satirical poetry ===
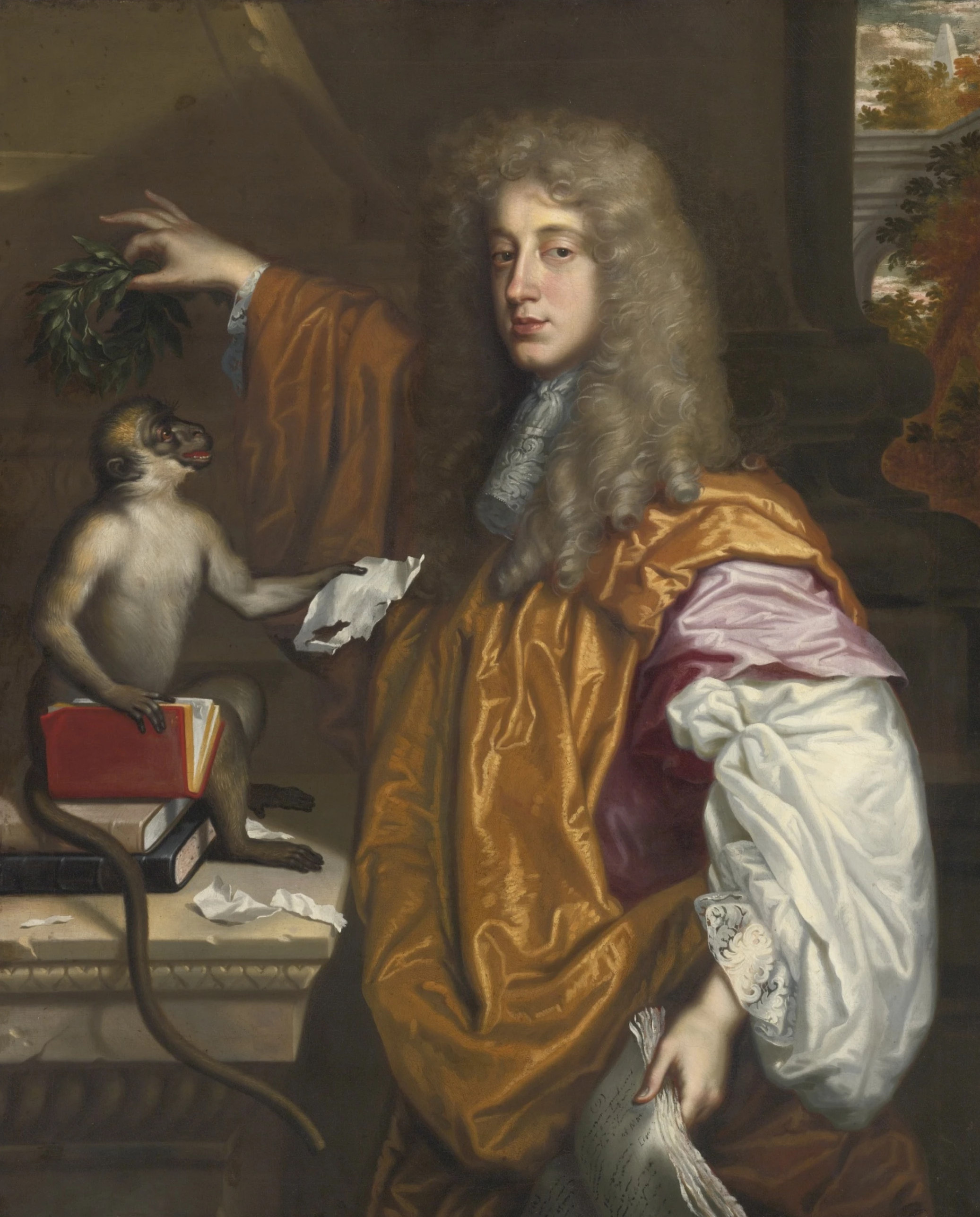
John Wilmot

Poetry can be a powerful vehicle for satire. The Romans had a strong tradition of satirical poetry, often written for political purposes. A notable example is the Roman poet Juvenal's satires.

The same is true of the English satirical tradition. John Dryden (a Tory), the first Poet Laureate, produced in 1682 Mac Flecknoe, subtitled "A Satire on the True Blue Protestant Poet, T.S." (a reference to Thomas Shadwell). Satirical poets outside England include Poland's Ignacy Krasicki, Iran's Ubayd Zakani, Azerbaijan's Sabir, Portugal's Manuel Maria Barbosa du Bocage, and Korea's Kim Kirim, especially noted for his Gisangdo.

=== Elegy ===
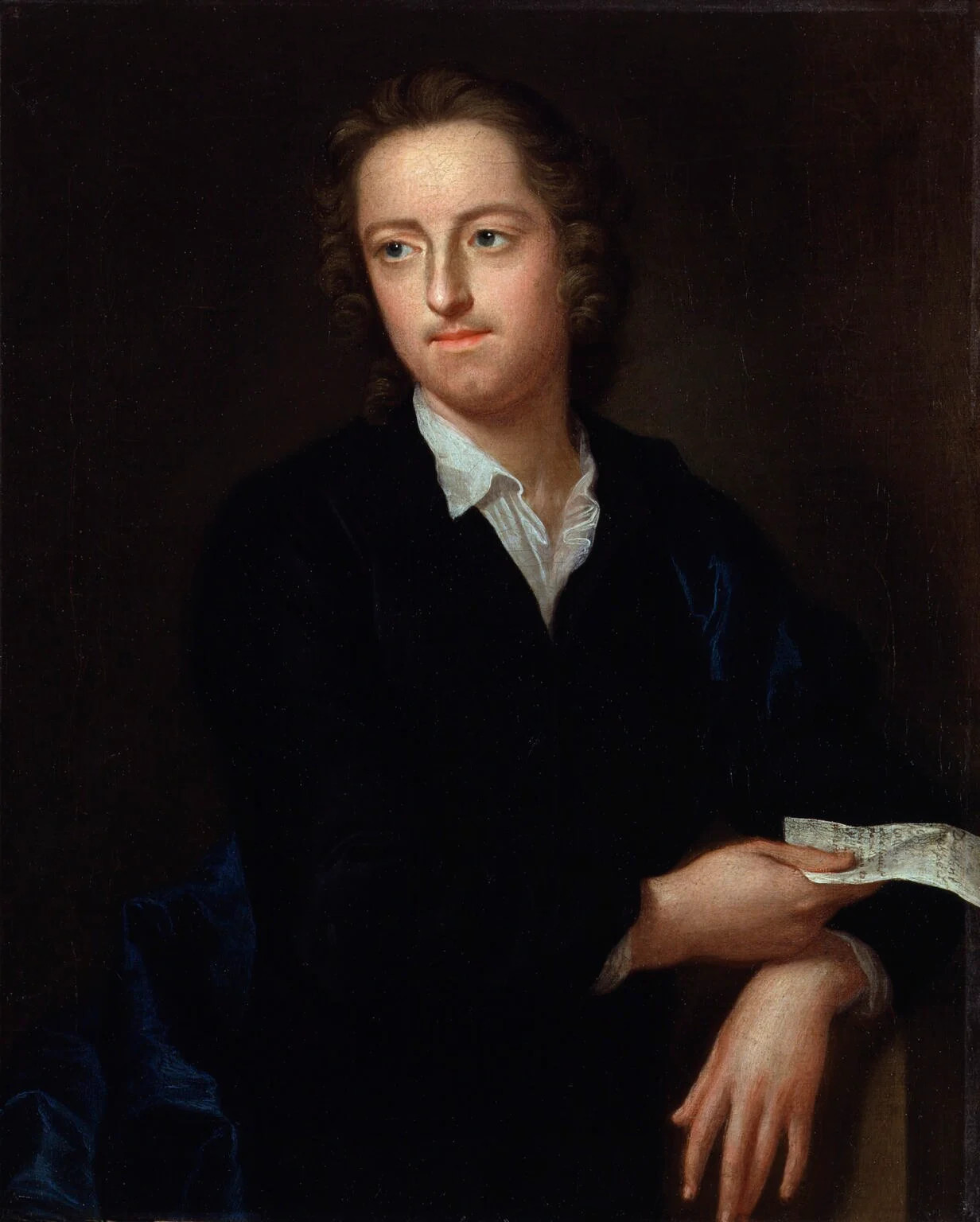
Thomas Gray

An elegy is a mournful, melancholy or plaintive poem, especially a lament for the dead or a funeral song. The term "elegy," which originally denoted a type of poetic meter (elegiac meter), commonly describes a poem of mourning. An elegy may also reflect something that seems to the author to be strange or mysterious. The elegy, as a reflection on a death, on a sorrow more generally, or on something mysterious, may be classified as a form of lyric poetry.

Notable practitioners of elegiac poetry have included Propertius, Khaqani, Jorge Manrique, Jan Kochanowski, Chidiock Tichborne, Edmund Spenser, Ben Jonson, John Milton, Thomas Gray, Charlotte Smith, William Cullen Bryant, Percy Bysshe Shelley, Johann Wolfgang von Goethe, Evgeny Baratynsky, Alfred Tennyson, Walt Whitman, Antonio Machado, Juan Ramón Jiménez, William Butler Yeats, Rainer Maria Rilke, and Virginia Woolf.

=== Verse fable ===
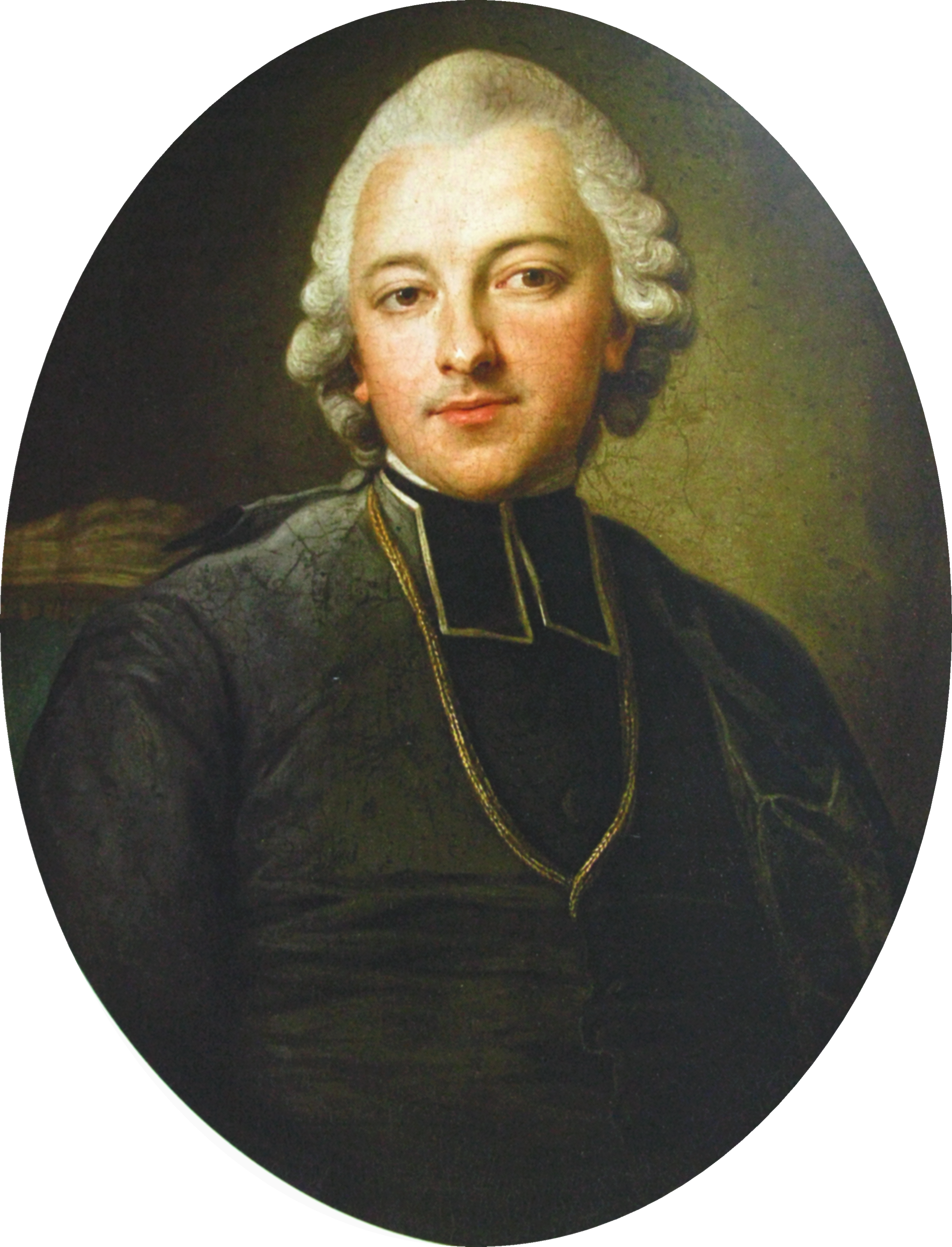
Krasicki

The fable is an ancient literary genre, often (though not invariably) set in verse. It is a succinct story that features anthropomorphised animals, legendary creatures, plants, inanimate objects, or forces of nature that illustrate a moral lesson (a "moral"). Verse fables have used a variety of meter and rhyme patterns.

Notable verse fabulists have included Aesop, Vishnu Sarma, Phaedrus, Marie de France, Nizami Ganjavi, Rumi, Robert Henryson, Biernat of Lublin, Jean de La Fontaine, Ignacy Krasicki, Félix María de Samaniego, Tomás de Iriarte, Ivan Krylov, and Ambrose Bierce.

=== Dramatic poetry ===
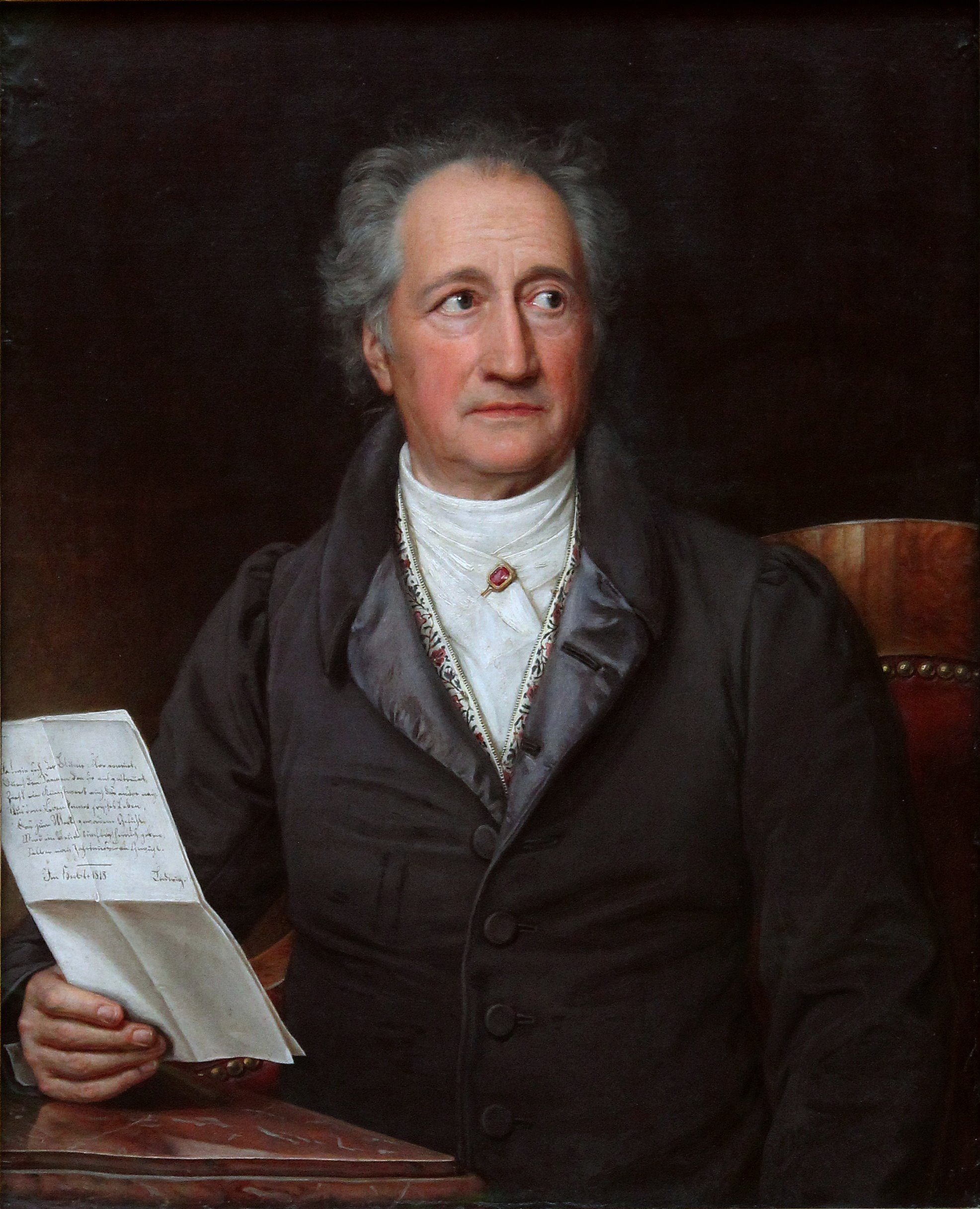
Goethe

Dramatic poetry is drama written in verse to be spoken or sung, and appears in varying, sometimes related forms in many cultures. Greek tragedy in verse dates to the 6th century B.C., and may have been an influence on the development of Sanskrit drama, just as Indian drama in turn appears to have influenced the development of the bianwen verse dramas in China, forerunners of Chinese Opera. East Asian verse dramas also include Japanese Noh. Examples of dramatic poetry in Persian literature include Nizami's two famous dramatic works, Layla and Majnun and Khosrow and Shirin, Ferdowsi's tragedies such as Rostam and Sohrab, Rumi's Masnavi, Gorgani's tragedy of Vis and Ramin, and Vahshi's tragedy of Farhad. American poets of 20th century revive dramatic poetry, including Ezra Pound in "Sestina: Altaforte," T.S. Eliot with "The Love Song of J. Alfred Prufrock".

=== Speculative poetry ===
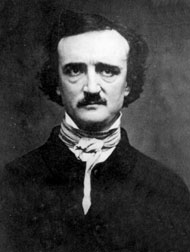
Poe

Speculative poetry, also known as fantastic poetry (of which weird or macabre poetry is a major sub-classification), is a poetic genre which deals thematically with subjects which are "beyond reality", whether via extrapolation as in science fiction or via weird and horrific themes as in horror fiction. Such poetry appears regularly in modern science fiction and horror fiction magazines.

Edgar Allan Poe is sometimes seen as the "father of speculative poetry". Poe's most remarkable achievement in the genre was his anticipation, by three-quarters of a century, of the Big Bang theory of the universe's origin, in his then much-derided 1848 essay (which, due to its very speculative nature, he termed a "prose poem"), Eureka: A Prose Poem.

=== Prose poetry ===
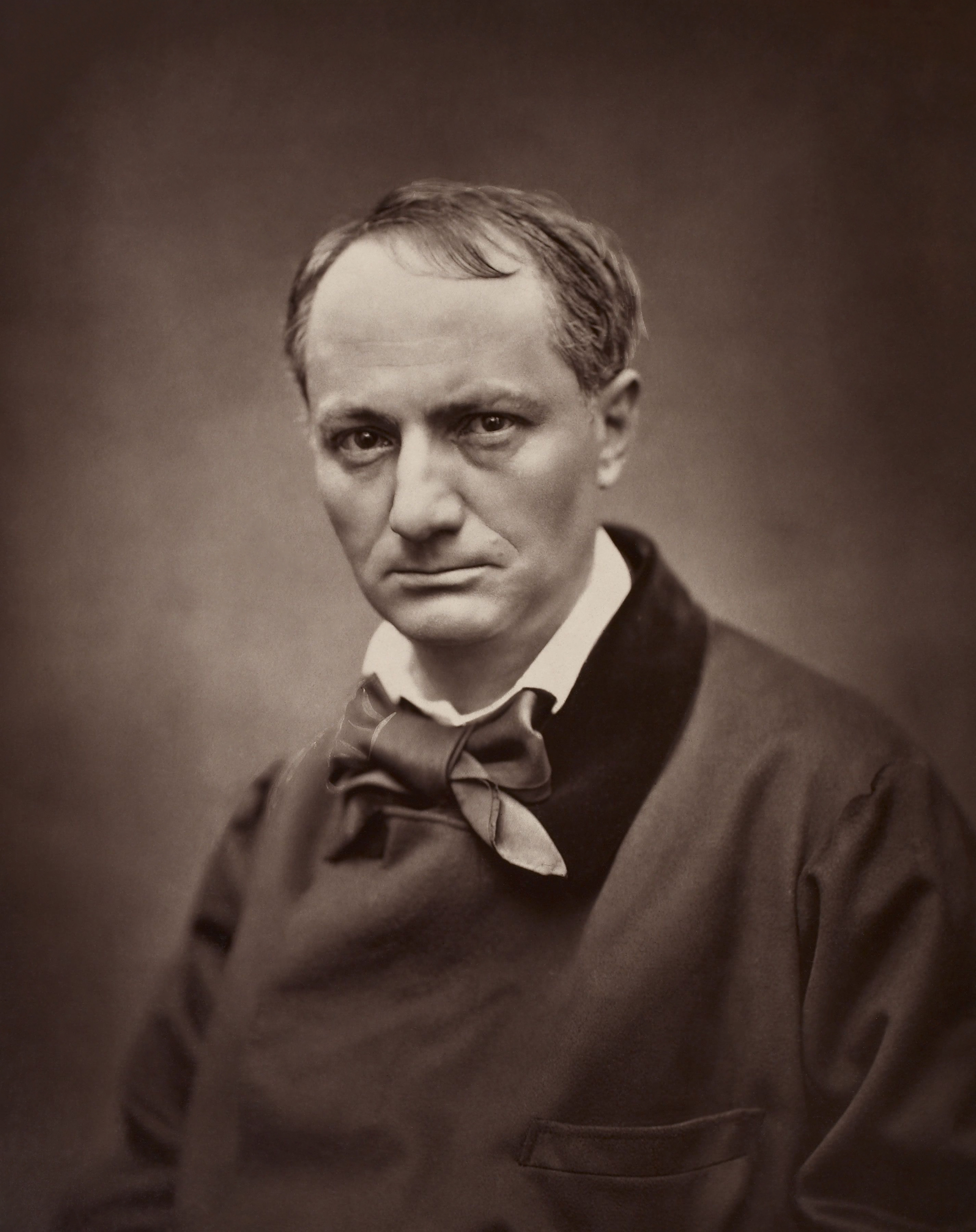
Baudelaire

Prose poetry is a hybrid genre that shows attributes of both prose and poetry. It may be indistinguishable from the micro-story (a.k.a. the "short short story", "flash fiction"). While some examples of earlier prose strike modern readers as poetic, prose poetry is commonly regarded as having originated in 19th-century France, where its practitioners included Aloysius Bertrand, Charles Baudelaire, Stéphane Mallarmé, and Arthur Rimbaud.

Independently of the European poetic tradition, Sanskrit prose-poetry (gadyakāvya) has existed from around the seventh century, with notable works including Kadambari.

Since the late 1980s especially, prose poetry has gained increasing popularity, with entire journals, such as The Prose Poem: An International Journal, Contemporary Haibun Online, and Haibun Today devoted to that genre and its hybrids. Latin American poets of the 20th century who wrote prose poems include Octavio Paz and Alejandra Pizarnik.

=== Light poetry ===
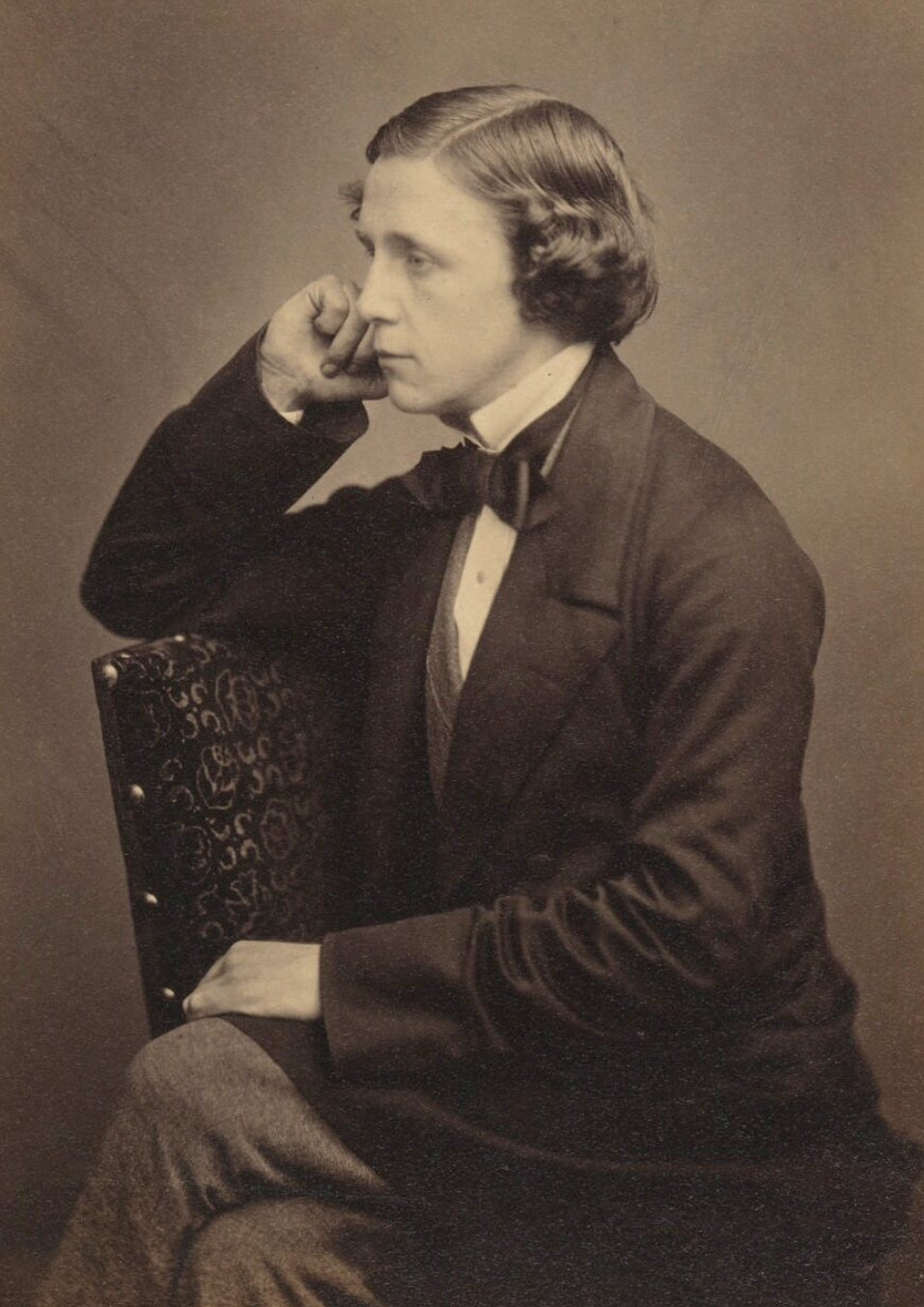
Lewis Carroll

Light poetry, or light verse, is poetry that attempts to be humorous. Poems considered "light" are usually brief, and can be on a frivolous or serious subject, and often feature word play, including puns, adventurous rhyme and heavy alliteration. Although a few free verse poets have excelled at light verse outside the formal verse tradition, light verse in English usually obeys at least some formal conventions. Common forms include the limerick, the clerihew, and the double dactyl.

While light poetry is sometimes condemned as doggerel, or thought of as poetry composed casually, humor often makes a serious point in a subtle or subversive way. Many of the most renowned "serious" poets have also excelled at light verse. Notable writers of light poetry include Lewis Carroll, Ogden Nash, X. J. Kennedy, Willard R. Espy, Shel Silverstein, Gavin Ewart and Wendy Cope.

=== Contemporary poetry ===
Contemporary poetry is a classification for any work of poetry made from 1945-present. As a more general genre, the focus of any piece of contemporary poetry has a wider range than other genres. Examples of contemporary poetry include slam poetry, performance poetry, and copy poetry. Although the genre has a wide range, contemporary poetry is most often associated with poetry that explores personal experiences and has greater diversity of voices. This common form of contemporary poetry is often used to respond to or acknowledge social, cultural, political, or personal issues.

The themes in common contemporary poetry within the U.S. were shaped by the experiences of people during the time period of the 1940s and 1950s. The Cold War and civil rights movements were responsible for shifts in culture that led to the rise of contemporary poetry in social contexts as a method of expression. Common contemporary poetry relies on emotions and experiences of individuals to motivate and inspire readers, and it can be used for political purposes. Regular themes for this genre are exploration of identity, social issues, climate issues, and personal experiences.

Popular contemporary poets include Natalie Diaz, Ada Limón, and Jericho Brown. Limón's own poetry finalized for the Kingsley Tufts Poetry Award, 2015 National Book Award in Poetry, and the 2016 National Book Critics Circle Award. Both Limón and Diaz's works focused on their own experiences that held personal significance, contributing to the individual messages of their works. Brown's poems, "Ganymede" and "As a Human Being", won the Cecil Hemley Memorial Award and the Lyric Poetry Award. His popular poems revolve around ideas of race and struggle.

=== Slam poetry ===
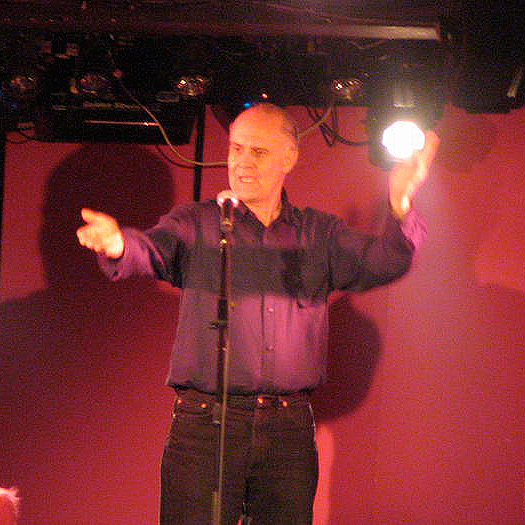
Smith

Slam poetry as a genre originated in 1986 in Chicago, Illinois, when Marc Kelly Smith organized the first slam. Slam performers comment emotively, aloud before an audience, on personal, social, or other matters. Slam focuses on the aesthetics of word play, intonation, and voice inflection. Slam poetry is often competitive, at dedicated "poetry slam" contests.

=== Performance poetry ===
Performance poetry, similar to slam in that it occurs before an audience, is a genre of poetry that may fuse a variety of disciplines in a performance of a text, such as dance, music, and other aspects of performance art.

== See also ==
- Anti-poetry
- Digital poetry
- Glossary of poetry terms
- Improvisation
- List of poetry groups and movements
- Oral poetry
- Outline of poetry
- Persona poetry
- Phonestheme
- Phono-semantic matching
- Poetry reading
- Rhapsode
- Semantic differential
- Spoken word

== Bibliography ==
- Adams, Stephen J. (1997). Poetic designs: an introduction to meters, verse forms and figures of speech. Broadview. ISBN 978-1-55111-129-2.
- Corn, Alfred (1997). The Poem's Heartbeat: A Manual of Prosody. Storyline Press. ISBN 978-1-885266-40-8.
- Fussell, Paul (1965). Poetic Meter and Poetic Form. Random House.
- Hollander, John (1981). Rhyme's Reason. Yale University Press. ISBN 978-0-300-02740-2.
- Pinsky, Robert (1998). The Sounds of Poetry. Farrar, Straus and Giroux. ISBN 978-0-374-26695-0.
- Speyer, Leonora (1926). Fiddler's farewell. New York: Alred A. Knopf.
