= Ezekiel 22 =

Book of Ezekiel, chapter 22

- ← chapter 21 chapter 23 →
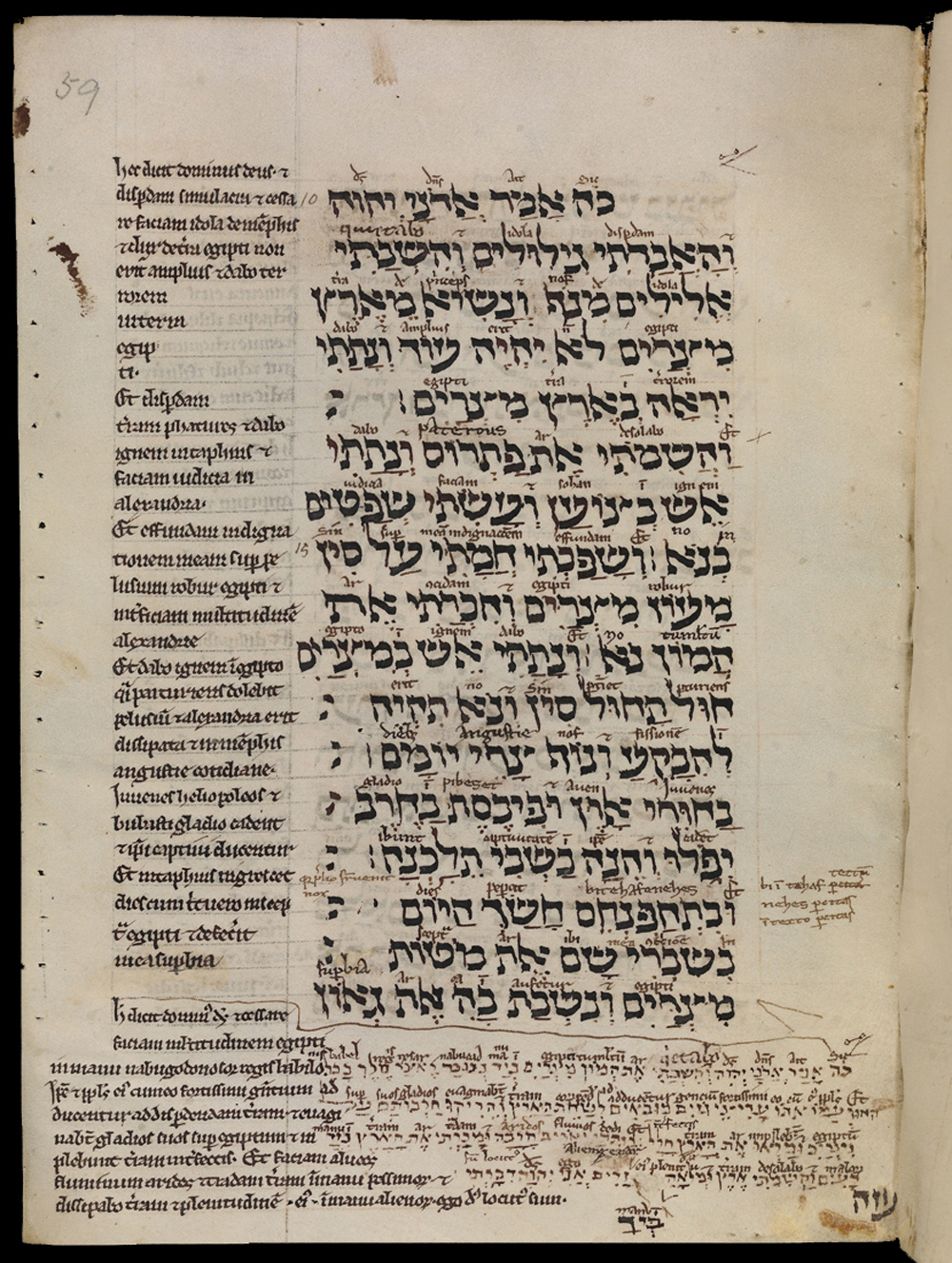
- Book of Ezekiel 30:13–18 in an English manuscript from early 13th century, MS. Bodl. Or. 62, fol. 59a. A Latin translation appears in the margins with further interlineations above the Hebrew.
- Book: Book of Ezekiel
- Hebrew Bible part: Nevi'im
- Order in the Hebrew part: 7
- Category: Latter Prophets
- Christian Bible part: Old Testament
- Order in the Christian part: 26

Ezekiel 22 is the twenty-second chapter of the Book of Ezekiel in the Hebrew Bible or the Old Testament of the Christian Bible. This book contains the prophecies attributed to the prophet/priest Ezekiel, and is one of the Books of the Prophets. Chapters 20 to 24 contain a series of "predictions regarding the fall of Jerusalem", and this chapter contains three separate prophecies centering on the inevitable punishment due to the city's guilt.

== Text ==
The original text was written in the Hebrew language. This chapter is divided into 32 verses.

=== Textual witnesses ===
Some early manuscripts containing the text of this chapter in Hebrew are of the Masoretic Text tradition, which includes the Codex Cairensis (895), the Petersburg Codex of the Prophets (916), Aleppo Codex (10th century), Codex Leningradensis (1008).

There is also a translation into Koine Greek known as the Septuagint, made in the last few centuries BC. Extant ancient manuscripts of the Septuagint version include Codex Vaticanus (B; $\mathfrak{G}$^{B}; 4th century), Codex Alexandrinus (A; $\mathfrak{G}$^{A}; 5th century) and Codex Marchalianus (Q; $\mathfrak{G}$^{Q}; 6th century). (Note: Ezekiel is missing from the extant Codex Sinaiticus.)

== Structure ==
The chapter has three divisions. The first contains a denunciation of the various sins of Jerusalem coupled with a promise of judgment (verses 1–16). The prophet then compares Jerusalem to metal filled with impurities, and promises that God will purge the impurities by burning (17-22). Ezekiel then justifies the judgment against Jerusalem in terms of wrongful acts committed by various leaders, including prophets, priests, and the nobility (23-31).

== Verse 2 ==
“Now, son of man, will you judge, will you judge the bloody city? Yes, show her all her abominations!

The phrase "Son of man" (Hebrew: בן־אדם ḇen-’āḏām) is used 93 times in the book of Ezekiel to address the prophet. Each of the three sections in this chapter commence with God's word to the "son of man" (verses 2, 18 and 24).

== Verse 18 ==
Son of man, the house of Israel has become dross to Me;

they are all bronze, tin, iron, and lead, in the midst of a furnace;
they have become dross from silver.

This verse introduces the figure of a smelting furnace.

- "Dross" (Hebrew: סיג or סוג, sig or sug, plural: סגים): "what is removed from metal", usually of silver; "the refuse of metal", "scoria", baser metal that is separated from the purer metal by melting. As silver is purified in the furnace to remove the floating dross until the reflection of the image of the refiner is shown from its molten surface, the judgment of Israel was for the purpose of purification.

== Verses 23-31 ==
An indictment of "all the classes of the nation": the royal house (verse 25), the priests (verse 26), the princes (verse 27), the prophets (verse 28) and the people of the land (verse 29).

== See also ==
- Bronze
- Iron
- Israel
- Jerusalem
- Lead
- Purification
- Sabbath
- Silver
- Ten Commandments
- Tin

== Bibliography ==
- Bromiley, Geoffrey W. (1995). International Standard Bible Encyclopedia: vol. iv, Q-Z. Eerdmans. ISBN 9780802837844.
- Brown, Francis; Briggs, Charles A.; Driver, S. R. (1994) [1906]. The Brown-Driver-Briggs Hebrew and English Lexicon (reprint ed.). Hendrickson Publishers. ISBN 978-1565632066.
- Clements, Ronald E (1996). Ezekiel. Westminster John Knox Press. ISBN 9780664252724.
- Gesenius, H. W. F. (1979) [1857]. Gesenius' Hebrew and Chaldee Lexicon to the Old Testament Scriptures: Numerically Coded to Strong's Exhaustive Concordance, with an English Index. Translated by Tregelles, Samuel Prideaux (7th ed.). Baker Book House.
- Joyce, Paul M. (2009). Ezekiel: A Commentary. Continuum. ISBN 9780567483614.
- Würthwein, Ernst (1995). The Text of the Old Testament. Translated by Rhodes, Erroll F. Grand Rapids, MI: Wm. B. Eerdmans. ISBN 0-8028-0788-7.
