= Ezekiel 21 =

Book of Ezekiel, chapter 21

- ← chapter 20 chapter 22 →
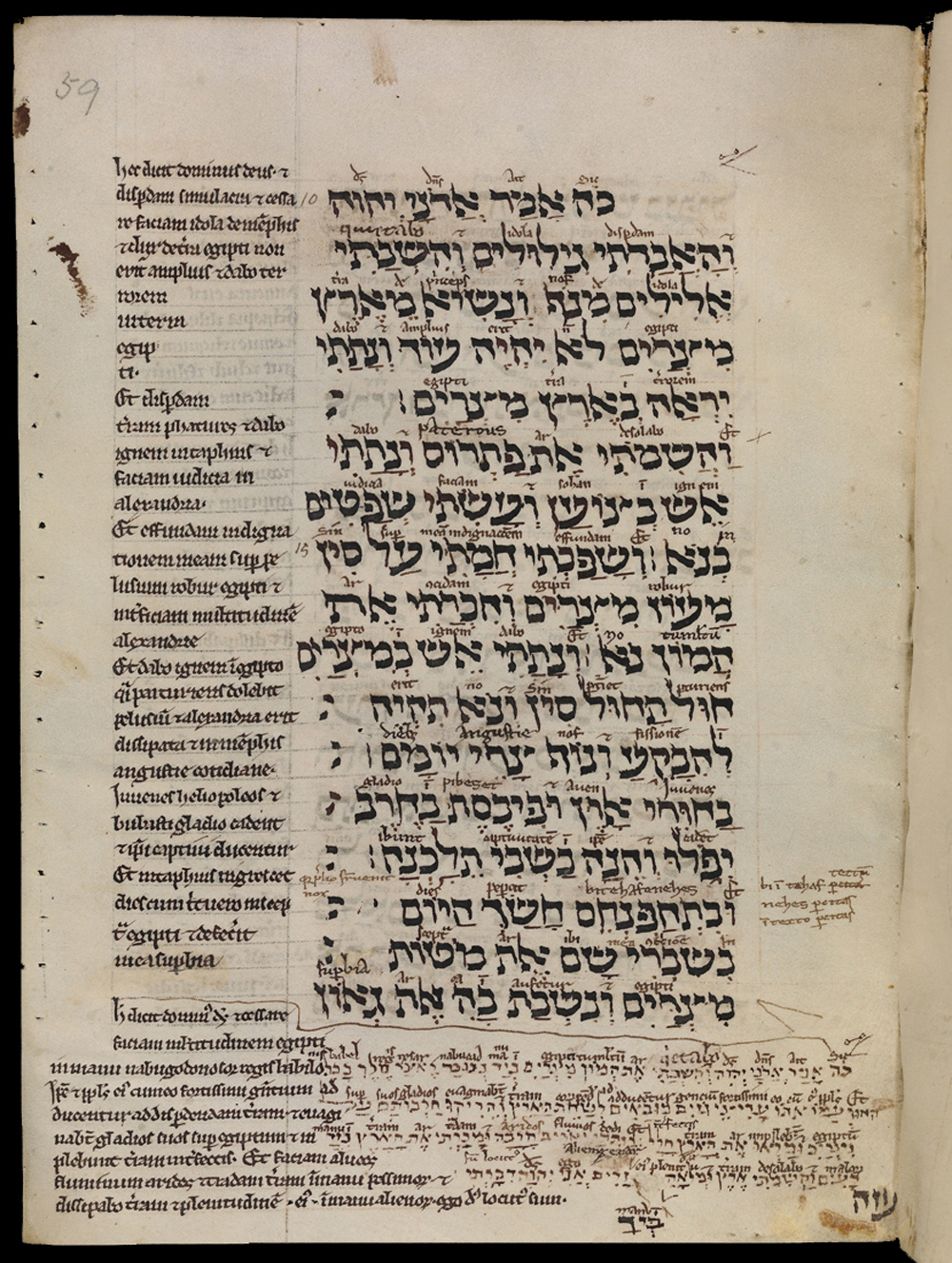
- Book of Ezekiel 30:13–18 in an English manuscript from the early 13th century, MS. Bodl. Or. 62, fol. 59a. A Latin translation appears in the margins with further interlineations above the Hebrew.
- Book: Book of Ezekiel
- Hebrew Bible part: Nevi'im
- Order in the Hebrew part: 7
- Category: Latter Prophets
- Christian Bible part: Old Testament
- Order in the Christian part: 26

Ezekiel 21 is the twenty-first chapter of the Book of Ezekiel in the Hebrew Bible or the Old Testament of the Christian Bible. This book contains the prophecies attributed to the prophet/priest Ezekiel, and is one of the Books of the Prophets. In chapters 20 to 24 there are "further predictions regarding the fall of Jerusalem", and this chapter also includes a prophecy against the Ammonites.

== Text ==
The original text of this chapter is written in the Hebrew language. This chapter is divided into 32 verses.

=== Textual witnesses ===
Some early manuscripts containing the text of this chapter in Hebrew are of the Masoretic Text tradition, which includes the Codex Cairensis (895), the Petersburg Codex of the Prophets (916), Aleppo Codex (10th century), Codex Leningradensis (1008).

There is also a translation into Greek known as the Septuagint, made in the last few centuries BC. Extant ancient manuscripts of the Septuagint version include Codex Vaticanus (B; $\mathfrak{G}$^{B}; 4th century), Codex Alexandrinus (A; $\mathfrak{G}$^{A}; 5th century) and Codex Marchalianus (Q; $\mathfrak{G}$^{Q}; 6th century). (Note: Ezekiel is missing from the extant Codex Sinaiticus.)

== Verses 6-7a ==
Sigh therefore, son of man, with a breaking heart, and sigh with bitterness before their eyes. And it shall be when they say to you, 'Why are you sighing?' that you shall answer, 'Because of the news; when it comes, every heart will melt, all hands will be feeble, every spirit will faint, and all knees will be weak as water.

As in Ezekiel 12:17–20, "Ezekiel is instructed in to act out the response to YHWH's actions, in this case moaning pitifully in order to provoke the people's curiosity and so provide further opportunity to warn them of the coming disaster".

== Verse 9 ==
Son of man, prophesy and say, 'Thus says the Lord!' Say:

'A sword, a sword is sharpened
And also polished!' (NKJV)

- "Son of man" (Hebrew: בן־אדם ben adam): this phrase is used 93 times to address Ezekiel, including seven times in this chapter.
- "Sword": it is first "polished" then "engaged."

== Verses 19b-20 ==
Make a sign; put it at the head of the road to the city. Appoint a road for the sword to go to Rabbah, [capital] of the Ammonites, and to Judah, into fortified Jerusalem.

The signpost represented the decision then faced by Nebuchadrezzar, king of Babylon, regarding which of these two capitals to attack.

== Verse 21 ==
For the king of Babylon stands at the parting of the road, at the fork of the two roads, to use divination: he shakes the arrows, he consults the images, he looks at the liver.

Three methods of divination are noted: Biblical scholar Julie Galambush comments that "the arrows apparently functioned like lots, first labelled and then shaken together in a quiver, after which one was drawn out"; teraphim (images) were also used in Canaan and Israel (see Genesis 31:19, 1 Samuel 19:13–16 and Hosea 3:4); hepatoscopy, divination based on the analysis of sheep livers, was widespread in the ancient Near East.

== See also ==
- Ammonites
- Babylon
- Israel
- Jerusalem
- Judah
- Rabbah
- Related Bible parts: Ezekiel 18, Hebrews 12

== Bibliography ==
- Bromiley, Geoffrey W. (1995). International Standard Bible Encyclopedia: vol. iv, Q-Z. Eerdmans. ISBN 9780802837844.
- Brown, Francis; Briggs, Charles A.; Driver, S. R. (1994). The Brown-Driver-Briggs Hebrew and English Lexicon (reprint ed.). Hendrickson Publishers. ISBN 978-1565632066.
- Clements, Ronald E (1996). Ezekiel. Westminster John Knox Press. ISBN 9780664252724.
- Gesenius, H. W. F. (1979). Gesenius' Hebrew and Chaldee Lexicon to the Old Testament Scriptures: Numerically Coded to Strong's Exhaustive Concordance, with an English Index. Translated by Tregelles, Samuel Prideaux (7th ed.). Baker Book House.
- Joyce, Paul M. (2009). Ezekiel: A Commentary. Continuum. ISBN 9780567483614.
- Würthwein, Ernst (1995). The Text of the Old Testament. Translated by Rhodes, Erroll F. Grand Rapids, MI: Wm. B. Eerdmans. ISBN 0-8028-0788-7.
