= Qinah =

Qinah is a term used mainly in the poetry of the Hebrew Bible (Christian Old Testament). It may refer to:

- kinah (a variant spelling): a poetic lament or dirge
- qinah (metre): the rhythm of line-pairs found in many such poems

== See also ==
- kinnot: Hebrew dirges or elegies
