= Biblical poetry =

Poetry found in the Hebrew Bible

The ancient Hebrews identified poetic portions in the sacred texts, as shown by their entitling as "psalms" or as "chants" passages such as Exodus 15:1-19 and Numbers 21:17-20; a song or chant (shir) is, according to the primary meaning of the term, poetry. The question as to whether the poetical passages of the Old Testament show signs of regular rhythm or meter remains unsolved. Many of the features of Biblical poetry are lost when the poems are translated to English.

== Characteristics of Ancient Hebrew poetry ==
=== Unusual forms ===
The employment of unusual forms of language cannot be considered as a sign of ancient Hebrew poetry. In Genesis 9:25–27 and elsewhere the form lamo occurs. But this form, which represents partly lahem and partly lo, has many counterparts in Hebrew grammar, as, for example, kemo instead of ke-; or -emo = "them"; or -emo = "their"; or elemo = "to them"—forms found in passages for which no claim to poetical expressions is made. Then there are found ḥayeto = "beast", osri = "tying", and yeshu'atah = "salvation"—three forms that probably retain remnants of the old endings of the nominative, genitive, and accusative: u(n), i(n), a(n).

Again, in Lamech's words, "Adah and Zillah, hear my voice; ye wives of Lamech, harken unto my speech", the two words he'ezin and imrah attract attention, because they occur for the first time in this passage, although there had been an earlier opportunity of using them: in Genesis 3:8 and 3:10, He'ezin = "to harken" could have been used just as well as its synonym shama' = "to hear".

Furthermore, imrah = "speech" might have been used instead of the essentially identical dabar in Genesis 9:1 and following, but its earliest use is, as stated above, in Genesis 4:23. In place of adam = "man" enosh is employed. (compare the Aramaic enash).

A systematic review of similar unusual forms of Hebrew grammar and Hebrew words occurring in certain portions of the Old Testament. Such forms have been called dialectus poetica since the publication of Robert Lowth's Prælectiones de Sacra Poesi Hebræorum iii. (1753); but this designation is ambiguous and can be accepted only in agreement with the rule a parte potiori fit denominatio for some of these unusual forms and words are found elsewhere than in the "songs" of the Old Testament.

These unusual forms and expressions do not occur in all songs, and there are several Psalms that have none of these peculiarities.

=== Parallelism ===
Not even the parallelismus membrorum is an absolutely certain indication of ancient Hebrew poetry. This "parallelism" occurs in the portions of the Hebrew Bible that are at the same time marked frequently by the so-called dialectus poetica; it consists in a remarkable correspondence in the ideas expressed in two successive units (hemistiches, verses, strophes, or larger units); for example, the above-cited words of Lamech, "Adah and Zillah, hear my voice; ye wives of Lamech, harken unto my speech", in which are found he'ezin and imrah, show a remarkable repetition of the same thought.

But this ideal corythmy is not always present in the songs of the Old Testament or in the Psalms, as the following passages will show:

- "The Lord is my strength and song, and he is become my salvation" (Exodus 15:2).
- "Saul and Jonathan, the beloved and the lovely in life, and in death they were not divided".
- "Ye daughters of Israel, weep over Saul, who clothed you in scarlet, and fine linen".
- "And he shall be like a tree planted by the rivers of water, that bringeth forth his fruit in his season";
- "I laid me down and slept; I awaked; for the Lord sustained me. I will not be afraid of ten thousands of people, that have set themselves against me round about".

Julius Ley says therefore correctly that

"the poets did not consider themselves bound by parallelism to such an extent as not to set it aside when the thought required it."

Though this restriction must be made to James Robertson's view, it remains the case that: "The distinguishing feature of the Hebrew poetry ... is the rhythmical balancing of parts, or parallelism of thought."

Various rhetorical forms appear in the parallelisms of Biblical poetry. These include:

- Synonymous parallelism; in this form, the second unit (hemistich or half line of verse, verse, strophe, or larger unit) says much the same thing as the first one, with variations. An example appears in Amos 5:24:

But let judgment run down as waters,

and righteousness as a mighty stream.

Another example of synonymous parallelism comes in Isaiah 2:4 or Micah 4:3:

"They will beat their swords into plowshares"

and their spears into pruning hooks.

- Antithesis is also found; here, the second unit directly contrasts with the first, often making the same point from the opposite perspective. From Proverbs 10:1:

A wise son maketh a glad father,

but a foolish son is the heaviness of his mother.

- Emblematic parallelism occurs where one unit renders figuratively the literal meaning of another.
- Synthetic parallelism occurs where the units balance, clause for clause, with one unit building upon or adding to the first. From Psalm 14:2:

The LORD looked down from heaven upon the children of men,

to see if there were any that did understand and seek God.

- Climactic parallelism occurs where the second unit partially balances the first, but also adds a summative thought or completes the series. From Psalm 29:1:

Give unto the LORD, O ye mighty,

give unto the LORD glory and strength.

- External parallelism occurs when the syntactic units balance one another across multiple verses. Here, some of the permitted sorts of parallelisms are added not only within a single line of verse, but also between lines. From Isaiah 1:27-28:

Zion shall be redeemed with judgment,

and her converts with righteousness.

And the destruction of the transgressors and the sinners shall be together,

and they that forsake the LORD shall be consumed.

External parallelism can also "accumulate" in a chiastic or "ring" structure that may include many verses. For example, Psalm 1 utilizes synonymous, synthetic, and emblematic parallelism before "turning" antithetically back to emblematic, synthetic, and then synonymous parallels.

=== Quantitative rhythm ===
The poetry of the ancient Hebrews is not distinguished from the other parts of the Old Testament by rhythm based on quantity, though in view of Greek and Roman poetry it was natural to seek such a rhythm in the songs and Psalms of the Old Testament. William Jones, for example, attempted to prove that there was a definite sequence of long and short syllables in the ancient Hebrew poems; but he could support this thesis only by changing the punctuation in many ways, and by allowing great license to the Hebrew poets. However, on reading the portions of the Old Testament marked by the so-called dialectus poetica or by parallelism (e.g., Genesis 4:23 and following) no such sequence of long and short syllables can be discovered; and Sievers says: "Hebrew prosody is not based on quantity as classical prosody is."

=== Accentual rhythm ===
Many scholars hold that the Hebrew poet considered only the syllables receiving the main accent, and did not count the intervening ones. Examples contrary to this are not found in passages where forms of the so-called dialectus poetica are used, as Ley holds; and Israel Davidson has proved that the choice of lamo instead of lahem favors in only a few passages the opinion that the poet intended to cause an accented syllable to be followed by an unaccented one.

The rhythm of Hebrew poetry may be similar to that of the German Nibelungenlied — a view that is strongly supported by the nature of the songs sung by the populace of Palestine in the early 20th century. These songs have been described by L. Schneller in the following words:

"The rhythms are manifold; there may be eight accents in one line, and three syllables are often inserted between two accents, the symmetry and variation being determined by emotion and sentiment."

Also in Palestine, Gustaf Hermann Dalman observed:

"Lines with two, three, four, and five accented syllables may be distinguished, between which one to three, and even four, unaccented syllables may be inserted, the poet being bound by no definite number in his poem. Occasionally two accented syllables are joined".

Such free rhythms are, in Davidson's opinion, found also in the poetry of the Old Testament. Under the stress of their thoughts and feelings the poets of Israel sought to achieve merely the material, not the formal symmetry of corresponding lines. This may be observed, for example, in the following lines of Psalm 2: "Serve the LORD with fear" ('Ibdu et-Yhwh be-yir'ah, 2:11), "rejoice with trembling" (we-gilu bi-re'adah). This is shown more in detail by König; and Carl Heinrich Cornill has confirmed this view by saying:

"Equal length of the several stichoi was not the basic formal law of Jeremiah's metric construction."

Sievers is inclined to restrict Hebrew rhythm by various rules, as he attacks Karl Budde's view, that

"a foot which is lacking in one-half of a verse may find a substitute in the more ample thought of this shorter line".

Furthermore, the verse of the Old Testament poetry is naturally iambic or anapestic, as the words are accented on one of the final syllables.

=== The Dirges ===
A special kind of rhythm may be observed in the dirges, called kinnot in Hebrew. A whole book of these elegies is contained in the Hebrew Bible, the first of them beginning thus: "How does the city sit solitary—that was full of people—how is she become as a widow—she that was great among the nations—and princess among the provinces—how is she become tributary!" (Lamentations 1:1).

The rhythm of such lines lies in the fact that a longer line is always followed by a shorter one. As in the elegiac couplet of Greco-Roman poetry, this change was intended to symbolize the idea that a strenuous advance in life is followed by fatigue or reaction. This rhythm, which may be designated "elegiac measure," occurs also in Amos 5:2, expressly designated as a ḳinah (often spelt qinah). The sad import of his prophecies induced Jeremiah also to employ the rhythm of the dirges several times in his utterances (Jeremiah 9:20, 13:18 and following). He refers here expressly to the meḳonenot (the mourning women) who in the East still chant the death-song to the trembling tone of the pipe (48:36 and following). Ḳinot are found also in Ezekiel 19:1, 26:17, 27:2, 32:2 and following, 32:16, 32:19 and following.

This elegiac measure, being naturally a well-known one, was used also elsewhere, as, for example, in Psalms 19:8–10. The rhythm of the ḳinah has been analyzed especially by Budde. Similar funeral songs of the modern Arabs are quoted by Wetzstein, as, e.g.: "O, if he only could be ransomed! truly, I would pay the ransom!"

=== Anadiplosis ===
A special kind of rhythm was produced by the frequent use of anadiplosis, in which the phrase at the end of one sentence is repeated at the beginning of the next. Examples include the passages "they came not to the help of the Lord [i.e., to protect God's people], to the help of the Lord against the mighty" and "From whence shall my help come? My help cometh from the Lord".

Many similar passages occur in Psalms 120-134, which also contain an unusual number of epanalepsis, or catch-words, for which Israel Davidson proposed the name Leittöne. Thus there is the repetition of shakan in Psalms 120:5–6; of shalom in Psalms 120:6–7; and the catch-word yishmor in Psalms 121:7–8. As the employment of such repetitions is somewhat suggestive of the mounting of stairs, the superscription shir ha-ma'alot, found at the beginning of these fifteen psalms, may have a double meaning: it may indicate not only the purpose of these songs, to be sung on the pilgrimages to the festivals at Jerusalem, but also the peculiar construction of the songs, by which the reciter is led from one step of the inner life to the next. Such graduated rhythm may be observed elsewhere; for the peasants in modern Syria accompany their national dance by a song the verses of which are connected like the links of a chain, each verse beginning with the final words of the preceding one.

=== Acrostics ===
Alphabetical acrostics are used as an external embellishment of a few poems. The letters of the alphabet, generally in their ordinary sequence, stand at the beginning of smaller or larger sections of Psalms 9-10 (probably), 25, 34, 37, 111, 112, 119, 145; Proverbs 31:10-31; Lamentations 1-4; and also of Sirach 51:13-29, as the newly discovered (but poorly preserved) Hebrew text of this book has shown.

Alphabetical and other acrostics occur frequently in Neo-Hebraic poetry. The existence of acrostics in Babylonian literature has been definitely proved; and alphabetical poems are found also among the Samaritans, Syrians, and Arabs. Cicero says (De Divinatione, II.54) that the verse of the sibyl was in acrostics; and the so-called Oracula Sibyllina contain an acrostic.

A secondary phenomenon, which distinguishes a part of the poems of the Old Testament from the other parts, is the so-called accentuatio poetica; it has been much slighted. Although not all the poetical portions of the Old Testament are marked by a special accentuation, the Book of Job in 3:3-42:6 and the books of Psalms and Proverbs throughout have received unusual accents. This point will be further discussed later on.

== Division of the poetical portions of the Hebrew Bible ==
=== Poems that deal with events ===
First may be mentioned poems that deal principally with events, being epic-lyric in character: the triumphal song of Israel delivered from Egypt, or the song of the sea; the mocking song on the burning of Heshbon; the so-called song of Moses; the song of Deborah; the derisive song of victory of the Israelite women; Hannah's song of praise; David's song of praise on being saved from his enemies; Hezekiah's song of praise on his recovery; Jonah's song of praise; and many of the Psalms, e.g., those on the creation of the world, and on the election of Israel. A subdivision is formed by poems that deal more with description and praise: the so-called Well song; the song of praise on the uniqueness of the god of Israel; and those on his eternity; his omnipresence and omniscience; and his omnipotence.

=== Didactic poems ===
Poems appealing more to reason, being essentially didactic in character. These include fables, like that of Jotham; parables, like those of Nathan and others, or in the form of a song; riddles, maxims, the monologues and dialogues in Job 3:3 and following; compare also the reflections in monologue in Ecclesiastes. A number of the Psalms also are didactic in character. A series of them impresses the fact that God's law teaches one to abhor sin, and inculcates a true love for the Temple and the feasts of Yahweh. Another set of Psalms ("theodicies") shows that God is just, although it may at times not seem this way to a short-sighted observer of the world and of history.

=== Lyrics ===
Poems that portray feelings based on individual experience. Many of these lyrics express joy, as, e.g., Lamech's so-called Song of the sword; David's "last words"; the words of praise of liberated Israel; songs of praise like Psalms 18, 24, 126, etc. Other lyrics express mourning. First among these are the dirges proper for the dead, as the ḳinah on the death of Saul and Jonathan; that on Abner's death; and all psalms of mourning, as, e.g., the expressions of sorrow of sufferers, and the expressions of penitence of sinners.

=== Poems that urge action ===
Finally, a large group of poems of the Old Testament that urge action and are exhortatory. These may be divided into two sections:

1. The poet wishes something for himself, as in the so-called "signal words" (Numbers 10:35 and following, "Arise, LORD" etc.); at the beginning of the Well song (21:17 and following, ali be'er); in the daring request, "Sun, stand thou still" (Joshua 10:12); in Habakkuk's prayer (tefillah; Habakkuk 3:1-19); or in psalms of request for help in time of war (44, 60, etc.) or for liberation from prison (122, 137, etc.).
2. The poet pronounces blessings upon others, endeavoring to move God to grant these wishes. To this group belong the blessing of Noah (Genesis 9:25-27), of Isaac (27:28-29 and 39-40), and of Jacob (49:3-27); Jethro's congratulation of Israel (Exodus 18:10); the blessing of Aaron (Numbers 6:24-26) and of Balaam (23:7-10, 18-24, 24:5-9, 24:17-24); Moses' farewell (Deuteronomy 33:1 and following); the psalms that begin with Ashre = "Blessed is," etc., or contain this phrase, as Psalms 1, 41, 84:5 and following, 84:13, 112, 119, 128.

It was natural that in the drama, which is intended to portray a whole series of external and internal events, several of the foregoing kinds of poems should be combined. This combination occurs in Canticles, which, in Davidson's opinion, is most correctly characterized as a kind of drama.

== See also ==
- Poetry
- Hebrew Bible
- Yemenite Jewish poetry
- List of national poetries
