= Oholah and Oholibah =

Pejorative personifications given by the prophet Ezekiel to Samaria and Jerusalem

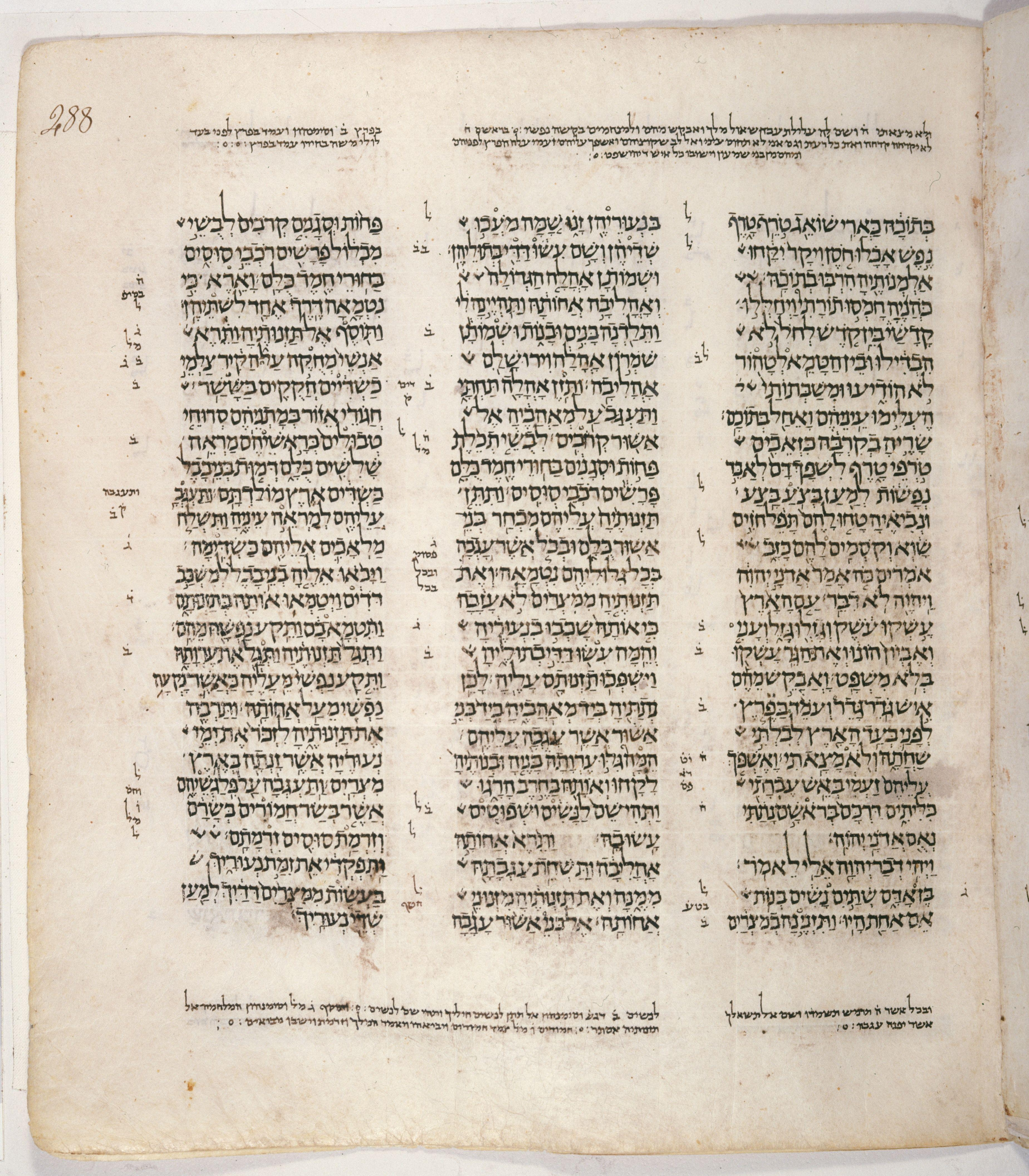
Page from the Leningrad Codex containing Ezekiel 22:25–23:21, including the section on Oholah and Oholibah.

In the Hebrew Bible, Oholah (אהלה ’Āholāh) and Oholibah (אהליבה ’Āholîḇāh) (or Aholah and Aholibah in the King James Version and Young's Literal Translation) are pejorative personifications given by the prophet Ezekiel to the cities of Samaria in the Kingdom of Israel and Jerusalem in the kingdom of Judah, respectively. They appear in chapter 23 of the Book of Ezekiel.

There is a pun in these names in the Hebrew. Oholah means "her tent", and Oholibah means "my tent is in her."

The Hebrew prophets frequently compared the sin of idolatry to the sin of adultery, in a reappearing rhetorical figure. Ezekiel's rhetoric directed against these two allegorical figures depicts them as lusting after Egyptian men in explicitly sexual terms in Ezekiel 23:20–21:

And she doted upon concubinage with them, whose flesh is as the flesh of asses, and whose issue is like the issue of horses. Thus thou didst call to remembrance the lewdness of thy youth, when they from Egypt bruised thy breasts for the bosom of thy youth.

— Ezekiel 23:20–21

== Ezekiel 23:44 ==
A hapax legomenon, אשת (’iššōṯ), is translated as "women", though it is different than the normal plural form of אשה (’iššāh, 'woman'), which is נשים (nāšîm). Paul Mankowski writes "'He went in to her as to a harlot, indeed they have gone in to Oholah and Oholibah אשת of wickedness.' The easiest and perhaps correct solution to the difficulty of the anomalous אשת in this verse is to assume the text is corrupt and emend it."

== Catharism ==
In the divergent theology of the Cathars, the heterodox Christian movement thriving in the 12th to 14th centuries, Oholah and Oholibah inspired the belief that the Cathar Invisible Father had two spiritual wives, Collam and Hoolibam.

== See also ==
- Ezekiel 16
- Ezekiel 23
- Oholiab
- Rape in the Hebrew Bible § Ezekiel 16 and 23
