= Karl Budde =

German theologian

Karl Ferdinand Reinhard Budde (13 April 1850 – 29 January 1935) was a German theologian, born in Bensberg, and a well-known authority on the Old Testament.

== Biography ==
He studied theology, philosophy and history at the universities of Bonn and Berlin, obtaining his habilitation for Old Testament studies at Bonn in 1873. He was inspector of the Evangelisches Theologisches Stift in Bonn from 1878 to 1885, and in the meantime, became an associate professor of Old Testament theology at the University of Bonn (1879). In 1889 he attained a full professorship at Strassburg, and from 1900 to 1921 served as president of Old Testament theology and exegesis at the University of Marburg. He received a D. D. from St. Andrews in 1911.

Budde was an honorary member of the Society for Old Testament Study.

== Selected works ==
- Das hebräische Klaglied (1882); In this treatise, Budde discusses the qinah meter, a rhythm of Hebrew dirges, such as found in the Book of Lamentations.
- Die biblische Urgeschichte (Gen. 1-12, 5) (1883) – Biblical pre-history; Genesis 1–12, 5.
- Das Buch Hiob : übersetzt und erklärt (1896) – The Book of Job: translated and explained.
- Die Bücher Richter und Samuel, ihre Quellen und ihr Aufbau (1900) & The Books of Judges and Samuel; their sources and structure.
- "The Religion of Israel to the Exile", in American Lectures on the History of Religions (1899).
- Die Bücher Samuel (1902) – The Books of Samuel.
- Das Alte Testament und die Ausgrabungen (1903) – The Old Testament and the excavations.
- contributions to the Encyclopaedia Biblica (1903)
- Das prophetische Schrifttum (1905) – Literature of the biblical prophets.
- Geschichte der althebräischen Litteratur (1906) – History of Old Hebrew literature.
- Auf dem Wege zum Monotheismus (1910) – On the path to Monotheism.
- The Song of Solomon in New World, March issue (1894).
- "The books of Samuel : critical edition of the Hebrew text printed in colors exhibiting the composite structure of the book" (English translation by Benjamin Wisner Bacon, 1894).
