= Ezekiel 19 =

Book of Ezekiel, chapter 19

- ← chapter 18 chapter 20 →
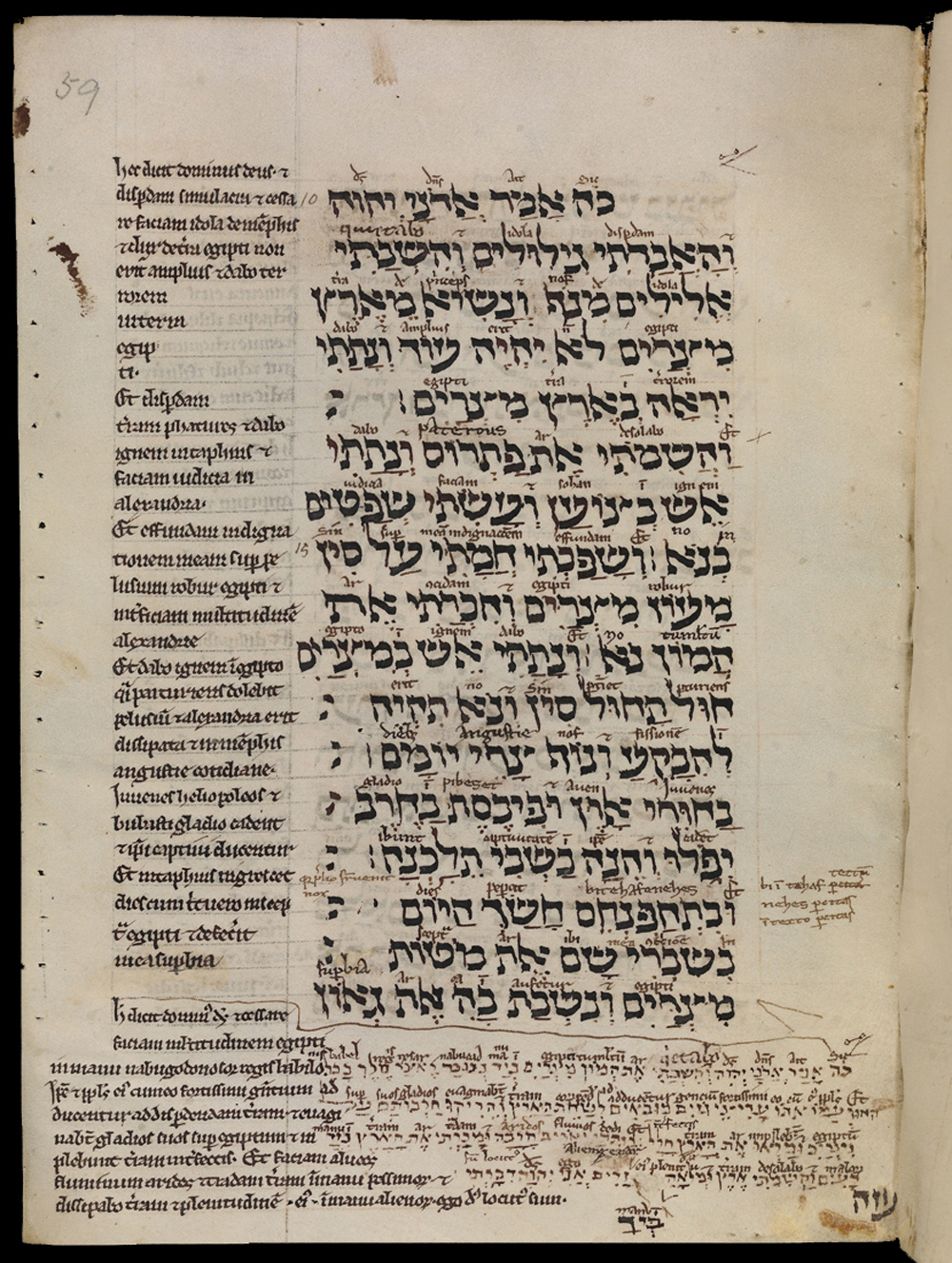
- Book of Ezekiel 30:13–18 in an English manuscript from the early 13th century, MS. Bodl. Or. 62, fol. 59a. A Latin translation appears in the margins with further interlineations above the Hebrew.
- Book: Book of Ezekiel
- Hebrew Bible part: Nevi'im
- Order in the Hebrew part: 7
- Category: Latter Prophets
- Christian Bible part: Old Testament
- Order in the Christian part: 26

Ezekiel 19 is the nineteenth chapter of the Book of Ezekiel in the Hebrew Bible or the Old Testament of the Christian Bible. This book contains the prophecies attributed to the prophet/priest Ezekiel, and is one of the Books of the Prophets. This chapter contains a kinah or lamentation for the rulers of Israel. Two princes are lamented, one captured and carried to Egypt, i.e. Jehoahaz, son and successor of Josiah (verses 1–4), and another carried to Babylon, who must be Jehoiachin (verses 5–9).

== Text ==
The original text was written in the Hebrew language. This chapter is divided into 14 verses.

=== Textual witnesses ===
Some early manuscripts containing the text of this chapter in Hebrew are of the Masoretic Text tradition, which includes the Codex Cairensis (895), the Petersburg Codex of the Prophets (916), Aleppo Codex (10th century), Codex Leningradensis (1008).

There is also a translation into Koine Greek known as the Septuagint, made in the last few centuries BC. Extant ancient manuscripts of the Septuagint version include Codex Vaticanus (B; $\mathfrak{G}$^{B}; 4th century), Codex Alexandrinus (A; $\mathfrak{G}$^{A}; 5th century) and Codex Marchalianus (Q; $\mathfrak{G}$^{Q}; 6th century). (Note: Ezekiel is missing from the extant Codex Sinaiticus.)

== Verse 1 ==
Moreover take thou up a lamentation for the princes of Israel (KJV)

- "Lamentation" (Hebrew: קינה qî-nāh; plural: קִינִים in Ezekiel 2:10 or קִּינֽוֹת in 2 Chronicles 35:25): the Hebrew word has a meaning of "elegy, dirge", "a mournful song".

== Verse 4 ==
The nations also heard of him; he was taken in their pit,

and they brought him with chains unto the land of Egypt.

- "With chains unto the land of Egypt": This is the fate of Jehoahaz (also called "Shallum") who succeeded his father, Josiah, as king in Jerusalem for 3 months in 609 BC, before being deposed by Pharaoh Necho II and taken as prisoner to Egypt until his death (2 Kings 23:31–34; 2 Chronicles 36:1-4; Jeremiah 22:10-12).

== Verse 5 ==
Now when she saw that she had waited, and her hope was lost,

then she took another of her whelps, and made him a young lion.

- "She took another of her whelps": Two of the last four kings of Judah, Jehoahaz and Zedekiah, was born of the same mother, Hamutal, and the same father, king Josiah, although the "lioness" in Ezekiel 9:1–9 generally refers to "Judah".

== Verse 9 ==
And they put him in ward in chains, and brought him to the king of Babylon:

they brought him into holds, that his voice should no more be heard upon the mountains of Israel.

- "Brought him to the king of Babylon": This is the fate of Zedekiah (also called "Mattaniah"), the last king of Judah, who was appointed as king in Jerusalem in 597 BC by Nebuchadnezzar II of Babylon to replace Jehoiachin, but later rebelled, was captured and brought before Nebuchadnezzar in Riblah, where his families were killed, he himself was made blind, then taken as prisoner to Babylon until his death.

== See also ==
- Babylon
- Hamutal
- Egypt
- Israel
- Jehoahaz
- Lion
- Vine
- Zedekiah
- Related Bible parts: Genesis 49, 2 Kings 23, 2 Kings 24, 1 Chronicles 3, 2 Chronicles 36, Jeremiah 1, Jeremiah 22, John 15

== Bibliography ==
- Bromiley, Geoffrey W. (1995). International Standard Bible Encyclopedia: vol. iv, Q-Z. Eerdmans. ISBN 9780802837844.
- Brown, Francis; Briggs, Charles A.; Driver, S. R. (1994). The Brown-Driver-Briggs Hebrew and English Lexicon (reprint ed.). Hendrickson Publishers. ISBN 978-1565632066.
- Clements, Ronald E (1996). Ezekiel. Westminster John Knox Press. ISBN 9780664252724.
- Gesenius, H. W. F. (1979). Gesenius' Hebrew and Chaldee Lexicon to the Old Testament Scriptures: Numerically Coded to Strong's Exhaustive Concordance, with an English Index. Translated by Tregelles, Samuel Prideaux (7th ed.). Baker Book House.
- Joyce, Paul M. (2009). Ezekiel: A Commentary. Continuum. ISBN 9780567483614.
- Würthwein, Ernst (1995). The Text of the Old Testament. Translated by Rhodes, Erroll F. Grand Rapids, MI: Wm. B. Eerdmans. ISBN 0-8028-0788-7.
