= Ezekiel 20 =

Book of Ezekiel, chapter 20

- ← chapter 19 chapter 21 →
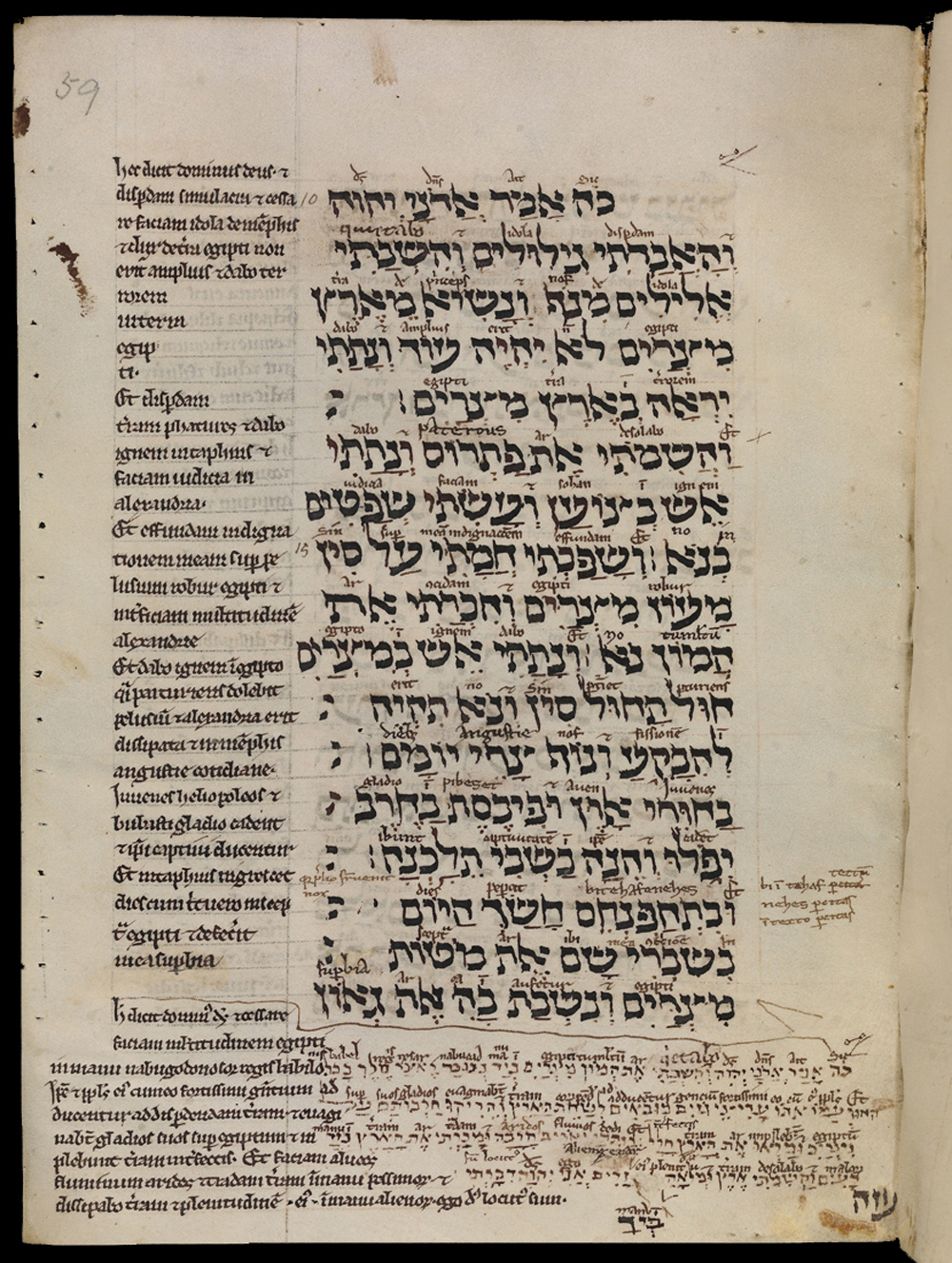
- Book of Ezekiel 30:13–18 in an English manuscript from the early 13th century, MS. Bodl. Or. 62, fol. 59a. A Latin translation appears in the margins with further interlineations above the Hebrew.
- Book: Book of Ezekiel
- Hebrew Bible part: Nevi'im
- Order in the Hebrew part: 7
- Category: Latter Prophets
- Christian Bible part: Old Testament
- Order in the Christian part: 26

Ezekiel 20 is the twentieth chapter of the Book of Ezekiel in the Hebrew Bible or the Old Testament of the Christian Bible. This book contains the prophecies attributed to the prophet/priest Ezekiel, and is one of the Books of the Prophets. In chapters 20 to 24 there are "further predictions regarding the fall of Jerusalem". In this chapter, Ezekiel speaks on God's behalf to some of the elders of Israel.

== Text ==
The original text of this chapter is written in the Hebrew language. This chapter is divided into 49 verses.

=== Textual witnesses ===
Some early manuscripts containing the text of this chapter in Hebrew are of the Masoretic Text tradition, which includes the Codex Cairensis (895), the Petersburg Codex of the Prophets (916), Aleppo Codex (10th century), Codex Leningradensis (1008).

There is also a translation into Koine Greek known as the Septuagint, made in the last few centuries BC. Extant ancient manuscripts of the Septuagint version include Codex Vaticanus (B; $\mathfrak{G}$^{B}; 4th century), Codex Alexandrinus (A; $\mathfrak{G}$^{A}; 5th century) and Codex Marchalianus (Q; $\mathfrak{G}$^{Q}; 6th century). (Note: Ezekiel is missing from the extant Codex Sinaiticus.)

== Verse 1 ==
It came to pass in the seventh year, in the fifth month, on the tenth day of the month,

that certain of the elders of Israel came to inquire of the Lord, and sat before me. (NKJV)

The opening of chapter 8 has similar wording. The recorded date of the occurrence in chapter 20 would fall in July–August 591 BC, calculated to be August 14, 591 BCE, based on an analysis by German theologian Bernhard Lang.

== Verse 4 ==
Will you judge them, son of man, will you judge them?

Then make known to them the abominations of their fathers. (NKJV)

- "Will you judge them?" - a recurrent theme, also seen in Ezekiel 22:2 and 23:36.
- "Son of man" (Hebrew: בן־אדם ḇen-’ā-ḏām): this phrase is used 93 times to address Ezekiel.
- "Abomination" (Hebrew plural: תּוֹעֲבֹ֥ת tō-‘ă-ḇōṯ; singular: תּוֹעֵבָה tôʻêbah, to-ay-baw'): something loathsome or objectionable, especially for "Jehovah" (Proverbs 3:32; 21:27), "specially used for things belonging to the worship of idols" or idolatrous practices and objects.

== Verse 5 ==
“Say to them, ‘Thus says the Lord God: “On the day when I chose Israel and raised My hand in an oath to the descendants of the house of Jacob, and made Myself known to them in the land of Egypt, I raised My hand in an oath to them, saying, ‘I am the Lord your God.’"

The text in the King James Version makes no reference to God's oath in this verse.

== Verses 6–10 ==
‘‘6 On that day I raised My hand in an oath to them, to bring them out of the land of Egypt into a land that I had searched out for them, ‘flowing with milk and honey,’ the glory of all lands. 7 Then I said to them, ‘Each of you, throw away the abominations which are before his eyes, and do not defile yourselves with the idols of Egypt. I am the Lord your God.’ But they rebelled against Me and would not obey Me. They did not all cast away the abominations which were before their eyes, nor did they forsake the idols of Egypt. Then I said, ‘I will pour out My fury on them and fulfill My anger against them in the midst of the land of Egypt.’ 9 But I acted for My name’s sake, that it should not be profaned before the Gentiles among whom they were, in whose sight I had made Myself known to them, to bring them out of the land of Egypt. 10 Therefore I made them go out of the land of Egypt and brought them into the wilderness.’’(NKJV)

Scholars have noted that Ezekiel 20:6–10 recounts Israel’s departure from Egypt without mentioning slavery. Gili Kugler argues that this omission reflects an alternative tradition in which Egypt was remembered as the place of God’s revelation and Israel’s initiation as his people, rather than as a house of slavery. In this reading, Israel’s departure is not an act of deliverance from oppression but the outcome of God’s unilateral election and desire to assert his authority.

== Verse 25 ==
"Therefore, I also gave them up to statutes that were not good, and judgments by which they could not live."

Biblical scholar Gili Kugler interprets that the prophet claims God indeed gave Israel “statutes that were not good.” According to this view, such laws, including practices like child sacrifice, functioned as a means to ensure the continued sinfulness of future generations. This, in turn, made the punishment of exile deserved, just as it would have been during their ancestors’ sojourn in Egypt Ezekiel 20:6–10 and during their wanderings in the desert. Kugler refers to this theological perspective as a form of "cruel theology," in which God deliberately imposes statutes in order to ensure that Israel’s wrongful behavior continued into future generations, thereby providing the grounds for their punishment.

== Verse 29 ==
Then I said to them, "What is this high place to which you go?" So its name is called Bamah to this day.

"Bamah" means "high place". Theologian Andrew B. Davidson suggests that Ezekiel uses "a punning and contemptuous derivation of the word", using what (mah) and go (ba):

What (mah) is the high place whereunto ye go (ba)?"

Whilst he disagrees with the interpretation, Davidson notes that "some have supposed that “go” has the sense of “go in” (e.g. Genesis 38:2: Judah saw there a daughter of a certain Canaanite ... and he married her and went in to her) and that the allusion is to the immoralities practised on the high places".

== Verse 35 ==
And I will bring you into the wilderness of the peoples, and there I will plead My case with you face to face.

The "wilderness of the peoples" is alternatively translated as "the wilderness of the nations" (NIV), or "a desert surrounded by nations" (Contemporary English Version). Davidson suggests it refers to "the Syro-Babylonian wilderness, adjoining the peoples among whom they were dispersed", perhaps the modern-day Syrian Desert. Davidson suggests that Ezekiel may have followed Hosea's words here:

Therefore, behold, I will allure her,

Bring her into the wilderness
And speak kindly to her.

== Verse 37 ==
“I will make you pass under the rod,

and I will bring you into the bond of the covenant; (NKJV)

- "Bond" (Hebrew: מסרת mā-sō-reṯ): "band" or "terms" in New Living Translation; contraction of מַאֲסֹרֶת, used in relation to the "covenant", the same root as the word "mesorah".

== See also ==
- Av: Fifth month in Hebrew calendar
- Exodus
- Egypt
- Israel
- Jacob
- Sabbath
- Ten Commandments
- Tisha B'Av
- Related Bible parts: Exodus 20, Deuteronomy 5, Romans 6, Galatians 5

== Bibliography ==
- Bromiley, Geoffrey W. (1995). International Standard Bible Encyclopedia: vol. iv, Q-Z. Eerdmans. ISBN 9780802837844.
- Brown, Francis; Briggs, Charles A.; Driver, S. R. (1994). The Brown-Driver-Briggs Hebrew and English Lexicon (reprint ed.). Hendrickson Publishers. ISBN 978-1565632066.
- Clements, Ronald E (1996). Ezekiel. Westminster John Knox Press. ISBN 9780664252724.
- Gesenius, H. W. F. (1979). Gesenius' Hebrew and Chaldee Lexicon to the Old Testament Scriptures: Numerically Coded to Strong's Exhaustive Concordance, with an English Index. Translated by Tregelles, Samuel Prideaux (7th ed.). Baker Book House.
- Joyce, Paul M. (2009). Ezekiel: A Commentary. Continuum. ISBN 9780567483614.
- Kee, Howard Clark; Meyers, Eric M.; Rogerson, John; Levine, Amy-Jill; Saldarini, Anthony J. (2008). Chilton, Bruce (ed.). The Cambridge Companion to the Bible (2, revised ed.). Cambridge University Press. ISBN 9780521691406.
- Würthwein, Ernst (1995). The Text of the Old Testament. Translated by Rhodes, Erroll F. Grand Rapids, MI: Wm. B. Eerdmans. ISBN 0-8028-0788-7.
