= Ezekiel 23 =

Book of Ezekiel, chapter 23

- ← chapter 22 chapter 24 →
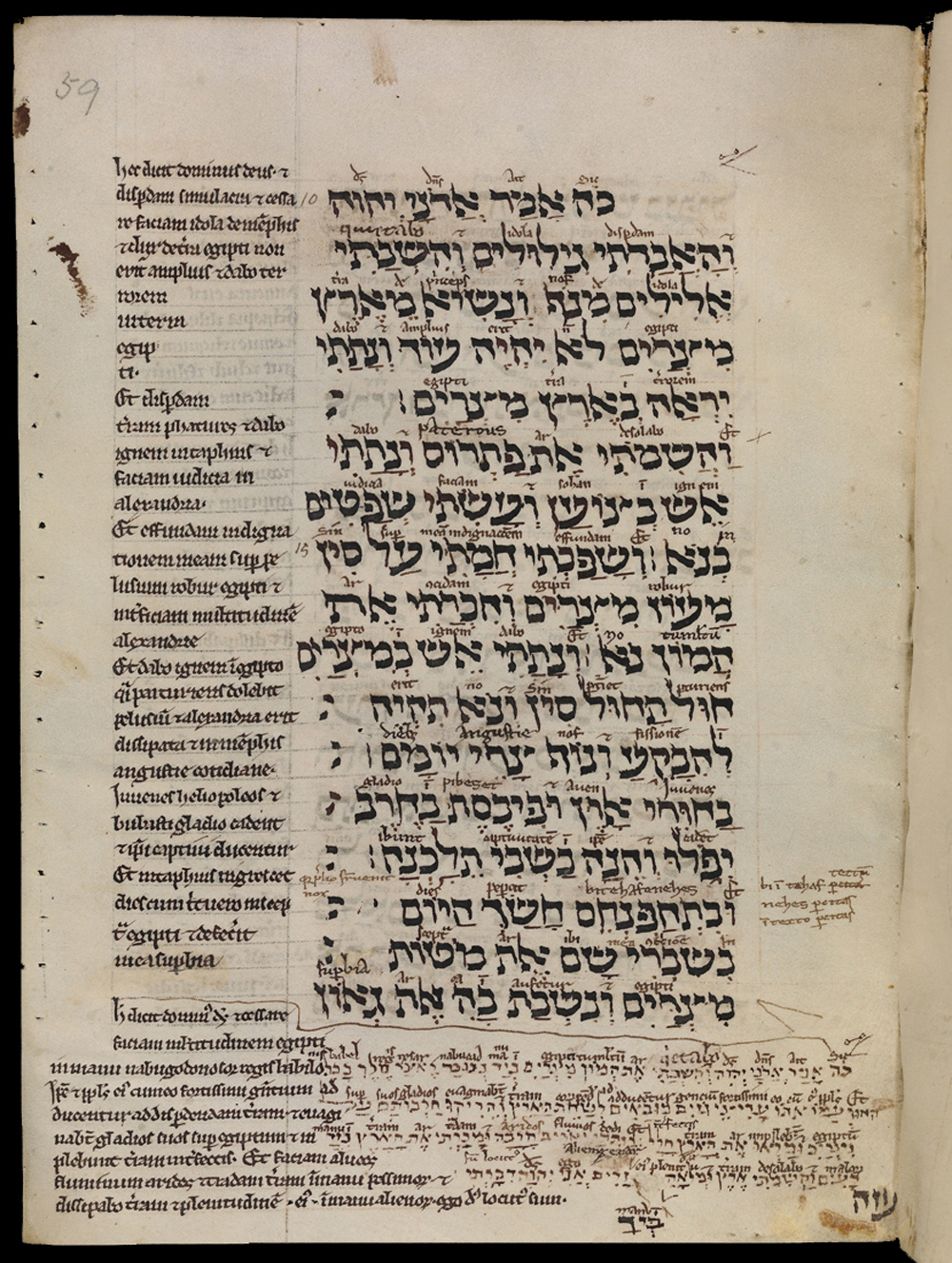
- Book of Ezekiel 30:13–18 in an English manuscript from the early 13th century, MS. Bodl. Or. 62, fol. 59a. A Latin translation appears in the margins with further interlineations above the Hebrew.
- Book: Book of Ezekiel
- Hebrew Bible part: Nevi'im
- Order in the Hebrew part: 7
- Category: Latter Prophets
- Christian Bible part: Old Testament
- Order in the Christian part: 26

Ezekiel 23 is the twenty-third chapter of the Book of Ezekiel in the Hebrew Bible or the Old Testament of the Christian Bible. This book contains the prophecies attributed to the prophet/priest Ezekiel, and is one of the Books of the Prophets. This chapter forms part of a series of "predictions regarding the fall of Jerusalem", and is written in the form of a message delivered by God to Ezekiel. It presents an extended metaphor in which Samaria and Jerusalem are compared to sisters named Oholah (Samaria) and Oholibah (Jerusalem), who are the wives of God and accused of "playing the whore" in Egypt then cuckolding her husband while he watched (Ezekiel 23:1–4).

== Text ==
The original text of this chapter is written in the Hebrew language. This chapter is divided into 49 verses.

=== Textual witnesses ===
In the Hebrew Masoretic tradition, some of the early manuscripts containing the text of this chapter in Hebrew language are the Codex Cairensis, Aleppo Codex (10th century), and Leningrad Codex (1008–1009). Fragments containing parts of this chapter were found among the Dead Sea Scrolls, that is, 4Q73 (4QEzek^{a}; 50–25 BCE) with extant verses 14–15, 17–18, 44–47.

There is also a translation into Koine Greek known as the Septuagint, made in the last few centuries BC. Extant ancient manuscripts of the Septuagint version include Codex Vaticanus (B; $\mathfrak{G}$^{B}; 4th century), Codex Alexandrinus (A; $\mathfrak{G}$^{A}; 5th century) and Codex Marchalianus (Q; $\mathfrak{G}$^{Q}; 6th century). (Note: Ezekiel is missing from the extant Codex Sinaiticus.)

== Contents ==
Ezekiel 23's metaphor of Israel and Judah as sisters married to God has attracted the attention of feminist scholars. In Ezekiel 23 their disapproved sexual relations in Egypt occur when they are young, before they are married to God. In Ezekiel 16, a text with some similarities but important differences as well, the metaphorical woman belongs to God from puberty, with her sexual offenses occurring only later. The reference to promiscuity in Egypt could refer to earlier political alliances.

Ohalah is accused of adultery with Assyrian soldiers, and of worshipping their gods (verses 5–7). This metaphorically refers to an earlier alliance between the Northern Kingdom of Samaria and Assyria. God punishes her relations with Assyria by giving her over to Assyrian control: they strip her naked, take her children, and kill her (9–10). This is a reference to the conquest of Israel by Assyria and the deportations of inhabitants which occurred in 722 B.C.E.

Knowing about her sister's punishment but disregarding it, Oholibah (Jerusalem, the capital city of the Southern Kingdom) continues her "whoring" with the Assyrians, and then with Babylonians as well (11–17). God abandons her in disgust, but she continues her "whorings" with her lovers (18–21).

As a result, God proclaims that he will send Babylonian soldiers to conquer Oholibah, to disfigure her, take her children, and burn her people (22–35). God then orders Ezekiel to announce this judgment to Oholibah (36), and accuses the Judahites of committing "adultery" by worshipping idols and practicing child sacrifice (37), polluting the temple and desecrating the Sabbath by simultaneously worshipping the god of Israel and idols (39). God compares this to prostitution (40–45) and calls for their punishment (46–49).

=== Verse 2 ===
"Son of man, there were two women,

The daughters of one mother."

- "Son of man" (Hebrew: בן־אדם ben adam): this phrase is used 93 times to address Ezekiel.

=== Verse 4 ===
Their names: Oholah the elder and Oholibah her sister;

They were Mine,

And they bore sons and daughters.

As for their names,

Samaria is Oholah, and Jerusalem is Oholibah.

- "Oholah and Oholibah": the pejorative names containing a pun in the Hebrew, Oholah means "her tent", and Oholibah means "my tent is in her", suggesting that "God's real dwelling (tent) was in Jerusalem". "Tent" also means "tabernacle".

== See also ==
- Assyria
- Babylonia
- Chaldea (Pekod, Shoa, Koa)
- Egypt
- Jerusalem
- Oholah and Oholibah
- Sabaeans
- Samaria
- Related Bible parts: 2 Kings 15, 2 Kings 17, 2 Kings 24, Isaiah 7, Isaiah 30, Isaiah 31, Ezekiel 16, Hosea 2, Hebrews 6

== Bibliography ==
- Bromiley, Geoffrey W. (1995). International Standard Bible Encyclopedia: vol. iv, Q-Z. Eerdmans. ISBN 9780802837844.
- Brown, Francis; Briggs, Charles A.; Driver, S. R. (1994). The Brown-Driver-Briggs Hebrew and English Lexicon (reprint ed.). Hendrickson Publishers. ISBN 978-1565632066.
- Clements, Ronald E (1996). Ezekiel. Westminster John Knox Press. ISBN 9780664252724.
- Joyce, Paul M. (2009). Ezekiel: A Commentary. Continuum. ISBN 9780567483614.
- Ulrich, Eugene, ed. (2010). The Biblical Qumran Scrolls: Transcriptions and Textual Variants. Brill.
- Würthwein, Ernst (1995). The Text of the Old Testament. Translated by Rhodes, Erroll F. Grand Rapids, MI: Wm. B. Eerdmans. ISBN 0-8028-0788-7.
