= Ezekiel 16 =

Book of Ezekiel, chapter 16

- ← chapter 15 chapter 17 →
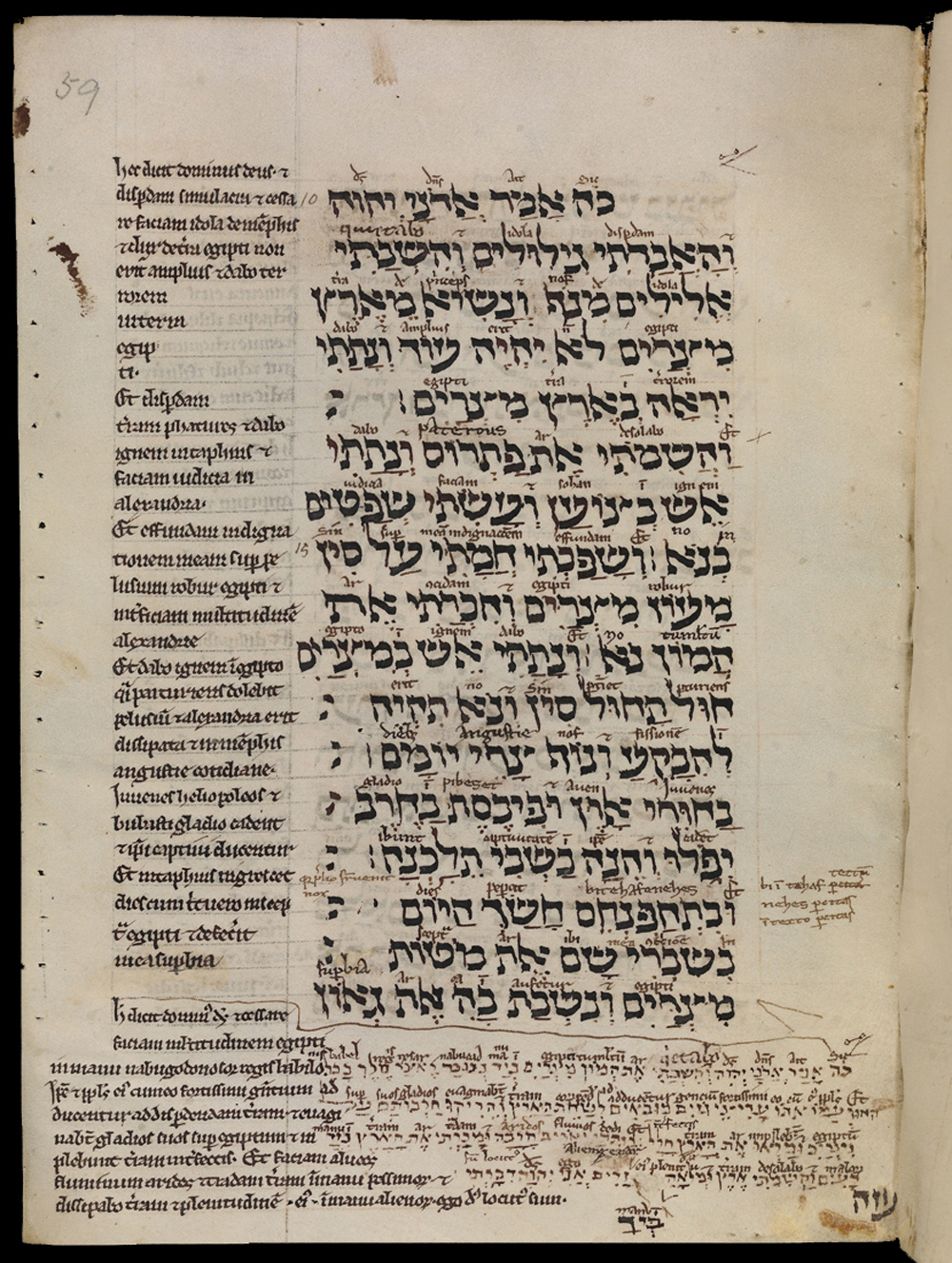
- Book of Ezekiel 30:13–18 in an English manuscript from the early 13th century, MS. Bodl. Or. 62, fol. 59a. A Latin translation appears in the margins with further interlineations above the Hebrew.
- Book: Book of Ezekiel
- Hebrew Bible part: Nevi'im
- Order in the Hebrew part: 7
- Category: Latter Prophets
- Christian Bible part: Old Testament
- Order in the Christian part: 26

Ezekiel 16 is the sixteenth chapter of the Book of Ezekiel in the Hebrew Bible or the Old Testament of the Christian Bible. This book contains prophecies attributed to the prophet/priest Ezekiel, and is one of the Books of the Prophets. Biblical scholar R. E. Clements calls this chapter "an Old Testament parable of the prodigal daughter", describing a shocking illustration of ungrateful Jerusalem in contrast to God's enduring love to her. This chapter is often linked to Ezekiel 23, which deals with two daughters, symbolizing the Kingdoms of Israel and Judah.

== Text ==
The original text was written in the Hebrew language. This chapter is divided into 63 verses. Ezekiel 16 describes an allegory in which Jerusalem is portrayed as an abandoned child who is rescued and nurtured by God, later becoming His wife. The narrative recounts Jerusalem’s humble beginnings, her growth and prosperity under divine care, and her subsequent unfaithfulness, represented through imagery of adultery and prostitution. The chapter concludes with a statement of judgment and a future promise of restoration within the framework of a renewed covenant.

=== Textual witnesses ===
Some early manuscripts containing the text of this chapter in Hebrew are of the Masoretic Text tradition, which includes the Codex Cairensis (895), the Petersburg Codex of the Prophets (916), Aleppo Codex (10th century), and Codex Leningradensis (1008). Fragments containing parts of this chapter in Hebrew were found among the Dead Sea Scrolls, that is, 3Q1 (3QEzek; 50 BCE–50 CE) with extant verses 31–33.

There is also a translation into Koine Greek known as the Septuagint, made in the last few centuries BC. Extant ancient manuscripts of the Septuagint version include Codex Vaticanus (B; $\mathfrak{G}$^{B}; 4th century), Codex Alexandrinus (A; $\mathfrak{G}$^{A}; 5th century) and Codex Marchalianus (Q; $\mathfrak{G}$^{Q}; 6th century). (Note: Ezekiel is missing from the extant Codex Sinaiticus.)

=== Incest and rhetorical shock ===
Biblical scholar Gili Kugler suggests that the rhetorical strength of the allegory in Ezek. 16 lies in its deliberate use of biblical prohibition. By transforming God’s role from an adoptive father to a husband, the text evokes the image of a father–daughter incestuous relationship. Kugler contends that this rhetorical device was designed to shock Ezekiel’s audience and provoke feelings of horror and shame, rather than to describe normative ancient practices. This interpretation contrasts with readings that view the allegory as merely reflecting conventional patriarchal values. Yet the shocking element lies in the fact that a sexual relationship between father and daughter is never explicitly prohibited in biblical law. Unlike other incestuous relationships that are clearly forbidden, this one remains unspoken and left within the realm of taboo. In this context, God’s transgression of that unarticulated boundary in Ezekiel’s allegory, exposes the capacity for such transgressions within humanity itself, with no restrictions.

== Verse 2 ==
Son of man, cause Jerusalem to know her abominations,

- "Son of man" (Hebrew: בן־אדם ḇen-'ā-ḏām): this phrase is used 93 times to address Ezekiel.
- "Abomination" (Hebrew: תּוֹעֵבָה tôwʻêbah, to-ay-baw'): something loathsome or objectionable, especially for "Jehovah" (Proverbs 3:32; 21:27), "specially used for things belonging to the worship of idols" or idolatrous practices and objects.

== Verse 3 ==
And say, Thus saith the Lord God unto Jerusalem;
Thy birth and thy nativity is of the land of Canaan;

thy father was an Amorite, and thy mother an Hittite.

God "commands Ezekiel to inform Jerusalem of the accusation brought against her, and in verses 3—34 provides a 'biography' for his bride". The assimilation of Israel with those former residents [of the land of Israel] led to apostasy.

== Verse 6 ==
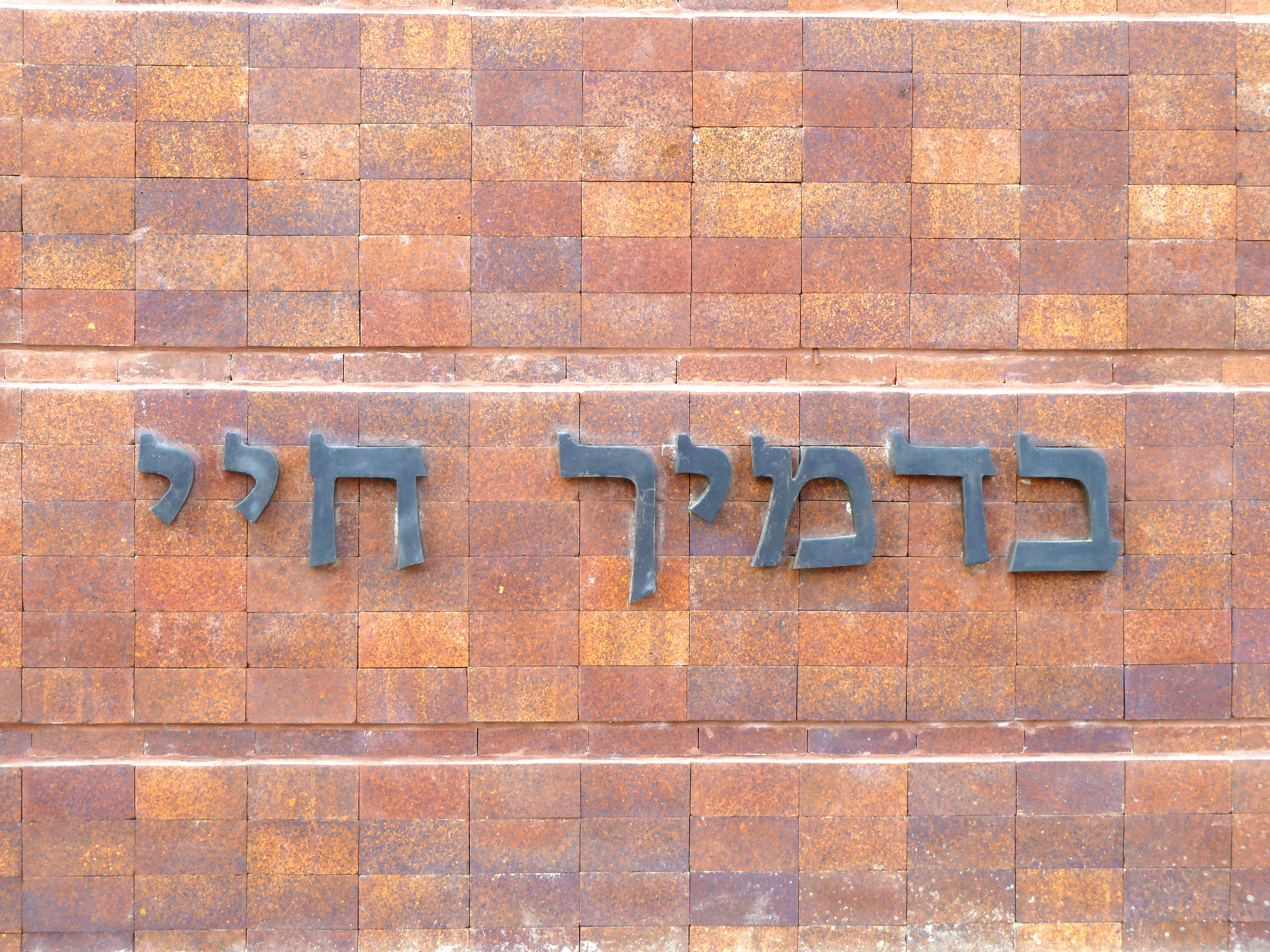
Jerusalem Yad Vashem, Hebrew inscription בדמיך חיי (In thy blood thou shalt live, Ezekiel 16:6).

And when I passed by thee, and saw thee polluted in thine own blood,
I said unto thee when thou wast in thy blood,
Live; yea, I said unto thee when thou wast in thy blood, Live.

- "Polluted" (Hebrew: מִתְבּוֹסֶסֶת miṯ-bō-se-seṯ, from the root verb בּוּס ḇūs, "tread down with feet" or "trample"): Rashi connects it to (Psalm 60:12, numbered as 60:14 in Hebrew version): "God ... shall tread down (Hebrew: יָבוּס) our enemies."

== Verse 16 ==
Moreover you multiplied your acts of harlotry as far as the land of the trader, Chaldea; and even then you were not satisfied.

Chaldea: "the land of the trader" or "the land of merchants". The King James Version lacks the wording which describes Chaldea as a trading nation.

== Verses 44-52 ==
An unfavourable comparison of Jerusalem to Samaria and Sodom.

== Verses 59-63 ==
God promises at last to forgive Jerusalem.

=== Verse 60 ===
Nevertheless I will remember my covenant with thee in the days of thy youth,

and I will establish unto thee an everlasting covenant.

God's remembrance of God's covenant with the patriarchs of Israel was anticipated in Leviticus 26:43–45.

== See also ==
- Amorites
- Assyria
- Canaan
- Chaldea
- Egypt
- Hittites
- Jerusalem
- Philistine
- Rape in the Hebrew Bible § Ezekiel 16 and 23
- Samaria
- Sodom
- Related Bible parts: Genesis 14, Leviticus 26, Isaiah 47, Ezekiel 23, John 15, Revelation 17

== Bibliography ==
- Bromiley, Geoffrey W. (1995). International Standard Bible Encyclopedia: vol. iv, Q-Z. Eerdmans. ISBN 9780802837844.
- Brown, Francis; Briggs, Charles A.; Driver, S. R. (1994). The Brown-Driver-Briggs Hebrew and English Lexicon (reprint ed.). Hendrickson Publishers. ISBN 978-1565632066.
- Clements, Ronald E (1996). Ezekiel. Westminster John Knox Press. ISBN 9780664252724.
- Gesenius, H. W. F. (1979). Gesenius' Hebrew and Chaldee Lexicon to the Old Testament Scriptures: Numerically Coded to Strong's Exhaustive Concordance, with an English Index. Translated by Tregelles, Samuel Prideaux (7th ed.). Baker Book House.
- Joyce, Paul M. (2009). Ezekiel: A Commentary. Continuum. ISBN 9780567483614.
- Ulrich, Eugene, ed. (2010). The Biblical Qumran Scrolls: Transcriptions and Textual Variants. Brill.
- Würthwein, Ernst (1995). The Text of the Old Testament. Translated by Rhodes, Erroll F. Grand Rapids, MI: Wm. B. Eerdmans. ISBN 0-8028-0788-7.
