= Ezekiel 18 =

Book of Ezekiel, chapter 18

- ← chapter 17 chapter 19 →
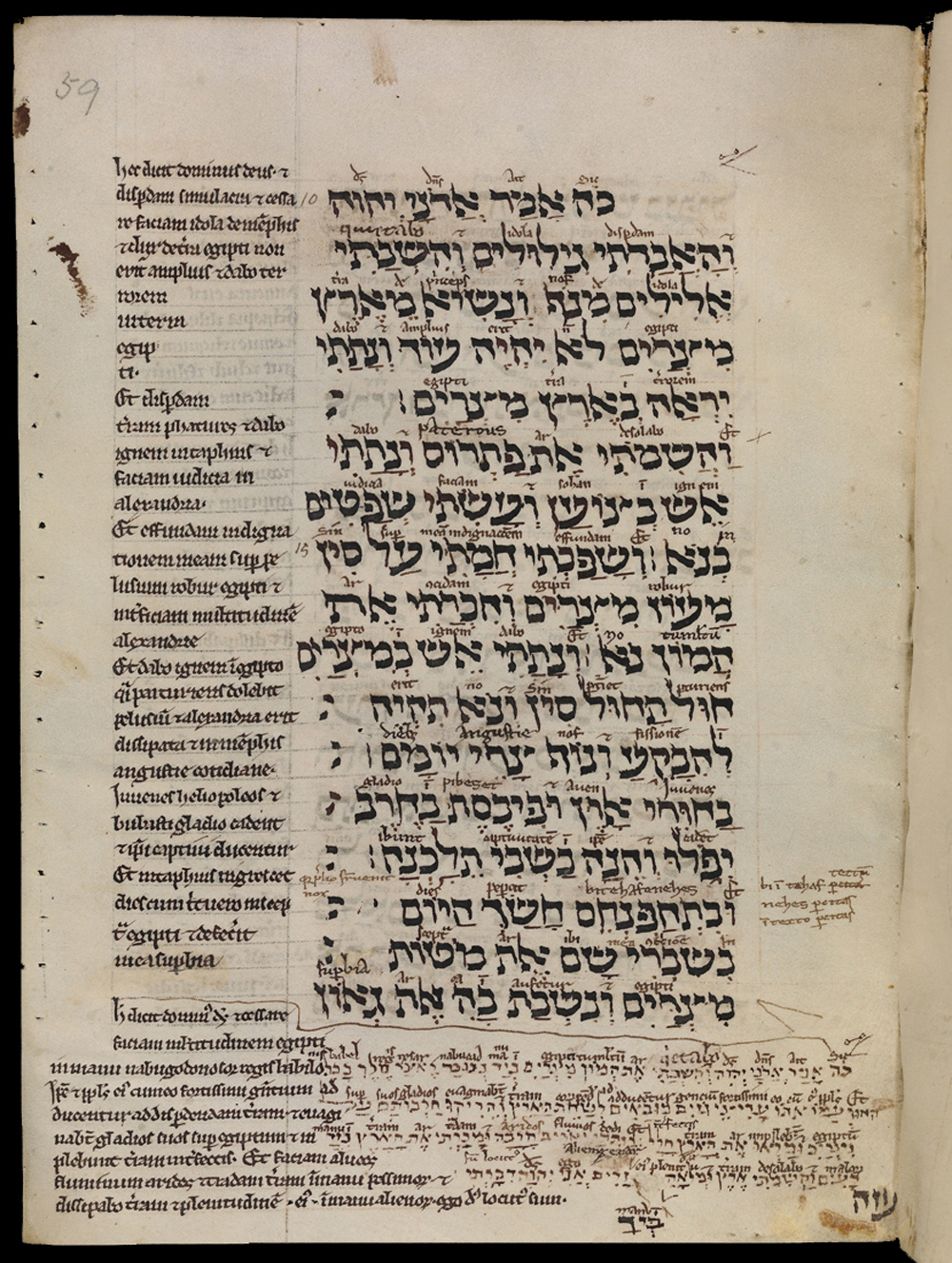
- Book of Ezekiel 30:13–18 in an English manuscript from the early 13th century, MS. Bodl. Or. 62, fol. 59a. A Latin translation appears in the margins with further interlineations above the Hebrew.
- Book: Book of Ezekiel
- Hebrew Bible part: Nevi'im
- Order in the Hebrew part: 7
- Category: Latter Prophets
- Christian Bible part: Old Testament
- Order in the Christian part: 26

Ezekiel 18 is the eighteenth chapter of the Book of Ezekiel in the Hebrew Bible or the Old Testament of the Christian Bible. This book contains the prophecies attributed to the prophet/priest Ezekiel, and is one of the Books of the Prophets. In this chapter, Ezekiel "departs from the Priestly belief in the transgenerational consequences of sin and stresses the moral responsibility of [each] generation".

== Text ==
The original text of this chapter is written in the Hebrew language. This chapter is divided into 32 verses.

=== Textual witnesses ===
Some early manuscripts containing the text of this chapter in Hebrew are of the Masoretic Text tradition, which includes the Codex Cairensis (895), the Petersburg Codex of the Prophets (916), Aleppo Codex (10th century), Codex Leningradensis (1008).

There is also a translation into Koine Greek known as the Septuagint, made in the last few centuries BC. Extant ancient manuscripts of the Septuagint version include Codex Vaticanus (B; $\mathfrak{G}$^{B}; 4th century), Codex Alexandrinus (A; $\mathfrak{G}$^{A}; 5th century) and Codex Marchalianus (Q; $\mathfrak{G}$^{Q}; 6th century). (Note: Ezekiel is missing from the extant Codex Sinaiticus.)

== Verse 2 ==
"What do you mean when you use this proverb concerning the land of Israel, saying:
'The fathers have eaten sour grapes,
and the children's teeth are set on edge'?"

The New King James Version calls this a "false proverb", while biblical commentator Albert Barnes calls it "a paganish saying".

== Verse 4 ==
"Behold, all souls are Mine;
The soul of the father
As well as the soul of the son is Mine;
The soul who sins shall die." (NKJV)

- "Soul" (Hebrew: חידה khî-ḏāh): the Hebrew word has a meaning of "enigmatic statements that require further interpretation", "allegorical and figurative", "dark, obscure utterance".
- "Parable" (Hebrew: משל mā-shāl;): "similitude" which is generally used in proverbs, generally form a comparison.

== Verse 32 ==
"For I have no pleasure in the death of one who dies," says the Lord God.
"Therefore turn and live!"

- "Turn" (Hebrew: השיבו hā-shî-ḇū, from the root verb שׁוּביבו shuḇ): the Hebrew word has a meaning of "turn back", "return, come or go back", "turn about", "be converted (as a sinner)."

== See also ==
- Israel
- Sin
- Usury
- Related Bible parts: 2 Kings 24, 2 Chronicles 36, Isaiah 11, Jeremiah 52, Matthew 13

== Bibliography ==
- Brown, Francis; Briggs, Charles A.; Driver, S. R. (1994). The Brown-Driver-Briggs Hebrew and English Lexicon (reprint ed.). Hendrickson Publishers. ISBN 978-1565632066.
- Clements, Ronald E (1996). Ezekiel. Westminster John Knox Press. ISBN 9780664252724.
- Gesenius, H. W. F. (1979). Gesenius' Hebrew and Chaldee Lexicon to the Old Testament Scriptures: Numerically Coded to Strong's Exhaustive Concordance, with an English Index. Translated by Tregelles, Samuel Prideaux (7th ed.). Baker Book House.
- Joyce, Paul M. (2009). Ezekiel: A Commentary. Continuum. ISBN 9780567483614.
- Matties, G. (1990), Ezekiel 18 and the Rhetoric of Moral Discourse, Society of Biblical Literature, SBL Dissertation Series, 126.
- Würthwein, Ernst (1995). The Text of the Old Testament. Translated by Rhodes, Erroll F. Grand Rapids, MI: Wm. B. Eerdmans. ISBN 0-8028-0788-7.
