= Kinah =

Hebrew lamentation

Kinah (Hebrew: קִינָה), also ḳinah or qinah (pl. kinot, kinoth, qinot, or qinoth), is Hebrew for a dirge or lamentation. Its general meaning is a dirge or lament, especially as sung by Jewish female professional mourners. Specifically, it can refer to one of the many Hebrew elegies traditionally chanted on Tisha B'Av. The Christian Jerusalem Bible refers to Isaiah 47 as a qinah or "lament for Babylon", and to Ezekiel 19 as a qinah or lamentation over the rulers of Israel. A. W. Streane suggested that Jeremiah 22:6–7, concerning the prophesied destruction of Jerusalem, was written "in Ḳinah metre".

Kinah was also the name of a city in the south of the Kingdom of Judah related in the book of Joshua 15:22. It was probably not far from the Dead Sea, in the Wady Fikreh.
