= Qinah (metre) =

Metre used in Hebrew biblical poetry

Qinah is a poetic metre used in various places in the Hebrew Bible (the Christian Old Testament) and most notably in the Book of Lamentations.

The metre describes pairs of unbalanced lines, the first having three stresses, the second having two. For example Lamentations 2:7 is three such line-pairs:

The Lord has rejected his altar,
spurned his sanctuary;
He has handed over to the enemy
the walls of its strongholds.
They shout in the house of the Lord
as on a feast day.

where bold syllables are stressed.

In the Bible this 3:2 stress pattern is found in some (not all) dirges, for which the Hebrew technical term is qinah. Consequently, this term also became applied to the metre itself.

The metre is often described as a "limping beat", sometimes characterised as "three beats of weeping followed by two beats of sobs". Thus, qinah may also be considered a form of catalexis.

Rather than Budde's late nineteenth century description of this as "metre", many scholars nowadays prefer the description of "rhythm", which is less tied to syllable counting.

Not all biblical dirges or laments are written in this metre, such as David's lament over Saul and Jonathan in 2 Samuel 1:17–27. And other, brighter passages do use this metre such as Song of Songs 1:9–11 and the hopeful Isaiah 40:9–11.
