= Ezekiel 24 =

Book of Ezekiel, chapter 24

- ← chapter 23 chapter 25 →
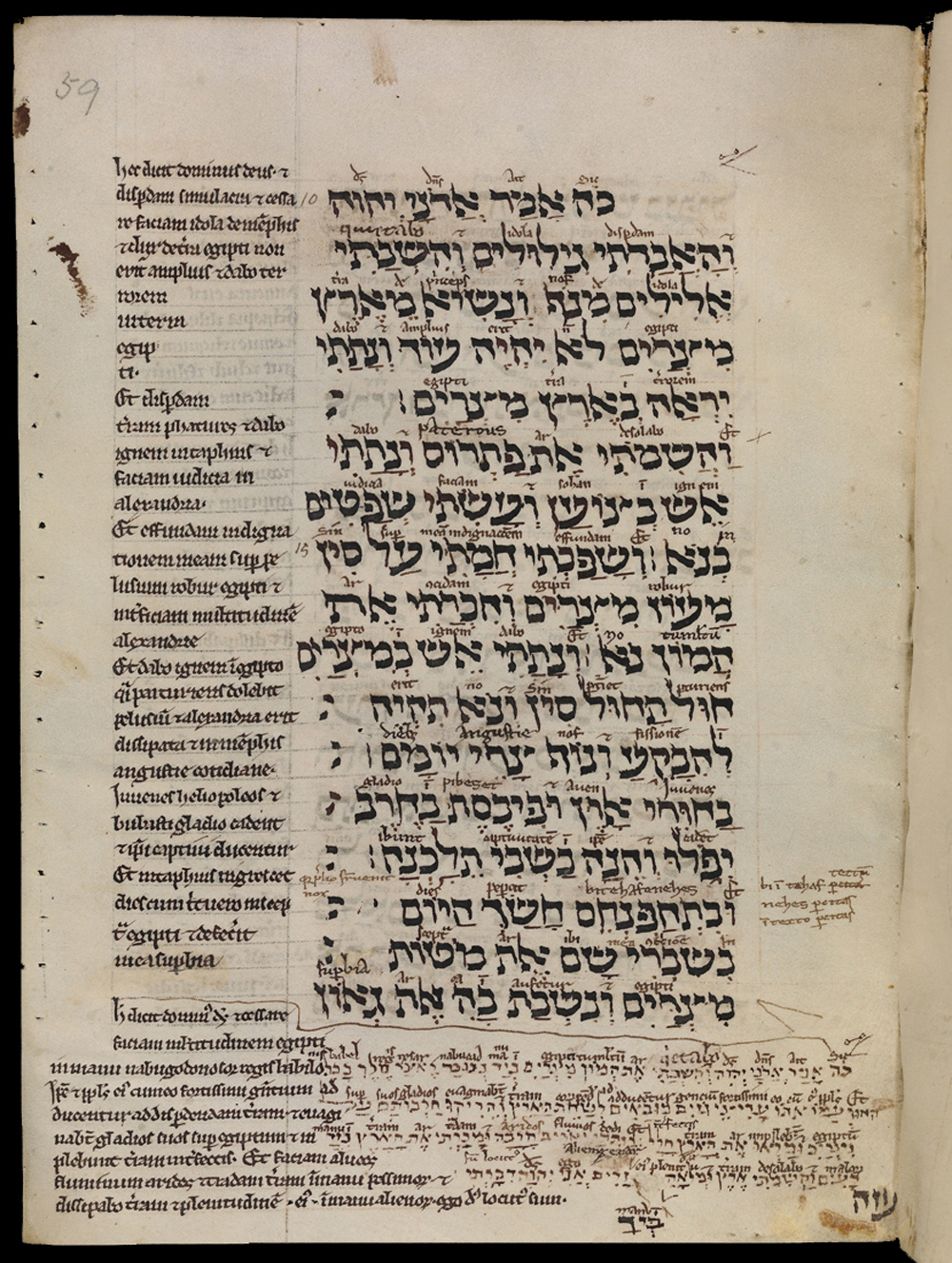
- Book of Ezekiel 30:13–18 in an English manuscript from the early 13th century, MS. Bodl. Or. 62, fol. 59a. A Latin translation appears in the margins with further interlineations above the Hebrew.
- Book: Book of Ezekiel
- Hebrew Bible part: Nevi'im
- Order in the Hebrew part: 7
- Category: Latter Prophets
- Christian Bible part: Old Testament
- Order in the Christian part: 26

Ezekiel 24 is the twenty-fourth chapter of the Book of Ezekiel in the Hebrew Bible or the Old Testament of the Christian Bible. This book is attributed to the prophet/priest Ezekiel, and is one of the Books of the Prophets. This chapter contains Ezekiel's "last oracle against Jerusalem".

== Text ==
The original text of this chapter was written in the Hebrew language. This chapter is divided into 27 verses.

=== Textual witnesses ===
In the Hebrew Masoretic tradition, some early manuscripts which contain the text of this chapter are the Codex Cairensis, Aleppo Codex (10th century), and Leningrad Codex (1008-1009). Fragments containing parts of this chapter were found among the Dead Sea Scrolls, that is, 4Q75 (4QEzek^{c}; 100–50 BCE) with extant verses 2–3.

There is also a translation into Koine Greek known as the Septuagint, made in the last few centuries BC. Extant ancient manuscripts of the Septuagint version include Codex Vaticanus (B; $\mathfrak{G}$^{B}; 4th century), Codex Alexandrinus (A; $\mathfrak{G}$^{A}; 5th century) and Codex Marchalianus (Q; $\mathfrak{G}$^{Q}; 6th century). (Note: Ezekiel is missing from the extant Codex Sinaiticus.) There are a number of places in this chapter where the Septuagint text lacks wording present in the Hebrew texts.

== Verse 1 ==
Again, in the ninth year, in the tenth month, on the tenth day of the month,

the word of the Lord came to me, saying, (NKJV)

Cross reference: 2 Kings 25:1–3; Jeremiah 39:1–2; Jeremiah 52:1–6

- "The tenth month" (of the ecclesiastical year on the Hebrew calendar): Tevet. The date corresponds to January 5, 587 BCE, based on the analysis by theologian Bernhard Lang, or 588 BCE, in the New Oxford Annotated Bible.

== Verse 2 ==
"Son of man, write thee the name of the day, even of this same day:

the king of Babylon set himself against Jerusalem this same day." (KJV)

- "Son of man" (Hebrew: בן־אדם ḇen-'ā-ḏām): this phrase is used 93 times to address Ezekiel.
- "Set" (Hebrew: סָמַ֤ךְ sā-maḵ): translated "started his siege" (NKJV); "has laid siege" (NIV); "drew close" (ASV). The Hebrew verb means "lean", "lay", "rest", "support", in the sense of "to place or lay something upon any thing, so that it may rest upon, and be supported by it" or "to lay hand on any thing, so as to lean upon the hand."

== The Parable to the Rebellious House (24:3–14) ==
The mashal, or the parable to the rebellious house is the oracle revealed to Ezekiel the prophet against the city of Jerusalem the same day the king of Babylon started his siege against it. It is also considered a proverb. The parable is 12 verses long from verse 3 to verse 14.

=== Hebrew Text ===
The following table shows the Hebrew text of Ezekiel 24:3-14 with vowels alongside an English translation based upon the JPS 1917 translation (now in the public domain).

Verse	Hebrew text	English translation (JPS 1917)
3	וּמְשֹׁ֤ל אֶל־בֵּית־הַמֶּ֙רִי֙ מָשָׁ֔ל וְאָמַרְתָּ֣ אֲלֵיהֶ֔ם כֹּ֥ה אָמַ֖ר אֲדֹנָ֣י יֱהֹוִ֑ה שְׁפֹ֤ת הַסִּיר֙ שְׁפֹ֔ת וְגַם־יְצֹ֥ק בּ֖וֹ מָֽיִם׃	And utter a parable concerning the rebellious house, and say unto them: Thus saith the Lord GOD: Set on the pot, set it on, And also pour water into it;
4	אֱסֹ֤ף נְתָחֶ֙יהָ֙ אֵלֶ֔יהָ כׇּל־נֵ֥תַח ט֖וֹב יָרֵ֣ךְ וְכָתֵ֑ף מִבְחַ֥ר עֲצָמִ֖ים מַלֵּֽא׃	Gather into it the pieces belonging to it, Even every good piece, the thigh, and the shoulder; Fill it with the choice bones.
5	מִבְחַ֤ר הַצֹּאן֙ לָק֔וֹחַ וְגַ֛ם דּ֥וּר הָעֲצָמִ֖ים תַּחְתֶּ֑יהָ רַתַּ֣ח רְתָחֶ֔יהָ גַּם־בָּשְׁל֥וּ עֲצָמֶ֖יהָ בְּתוֹכָֽהּ׃ {ס}	Take the choice of the flock, And pile also the bones under it; Make it boil well, That the bones thereof may also be seethed in the midst of it.
6	לָכֵ֞ן כֹּה־אָמַ֣ר ׀ אֲדֹנָ֣י יֱהֹוִ֗ה אוֹי֮ עִ֣יר הַדָּמִים֒ סִ֚יר אֲשֶׁ֣ר חֶלְאָתָ֣הֿ בָ֔הּ וְחֶ֨לְאָתָ֔הּ לֹ֥א יָצְאָ֖ה מִמֶּ֑נָּה לִנְתָחֶ֤יהָ לִנְתָחֶ֙יהָ֙ הֽוֹצִיאָ֔הּ לֹא־נָפַ֥ל עָלֶ֖יהָ גּוֹרָֽל׃	Wherefore thus saith the Lord GOD: Woe to the bloody city, to the pot whose filth is therein, and whose filth is not gone out of it! bring it out piece by piece; no lot is fallen upon it.
7	כִּ֤י דָמָהּ֙ בְּתוֹכָ֣הּ הָיָ֔ה עַל־צְחִ֥יחַ סֶ֖לַע שָׂמָ֑תְהוּ לֹ֤א שְׁפָכַ֙תְהוּ֙ עַל־הָאָ֔רֶץ לְכַסּ֥וֹת עָלָ֖יו עָפָֽר׃	For her blood is in the midst of her; she set it upon the bare rock; she poured it not upon the ground, to cover it with dust;
8	לְהַעֲל֤וֹת חֵמָה֙ לִנְקֹ֣ם נָקָ֔ם נָתַ֥תִּי אֶת־דָּמָ֖הּ עַל־צְחִ֣יחַ סָ֑לַע לְבִלְתִּ֖י הִכָּסֽוֹת׃ {פ}	that it might cause fury to come up, that vengeance might be taken, I have set her blood upon the bare rock, that it should not be covered.
9	לָכֵ֗ן כֹּ֤ה אָמַר֙ אֲדֹנָ֣י יֱהֹוִ֔ה א֖וֹי עִ֣יר הַדָּמִ֑ים גַּם־אֲנִ֖י אַגְדִּ֥יל הַמְּדוּרָֽה׃	Therefore thus saith the Lord GOD: Woe to the bloody city! I also will make the pile great,
10	הַרְבֵּ֤ה הָעֵצִים֙ הַדְלֵ֣ק הָאֵ֔שׁ הָתֵ֖ם הַבָּשָׂ֑ר וְהַרְקַח֙ הַמֶּרְקָחָ֔ה וְהָעֲצָמ֖וֹת יֵחָֽרוּ׃	heaping on the wood, kindling the fire, that the flesh may be consumed; and preparing the mixture, that the bones also may be burned;
11	וְהַעֲמִידֶ֥הָ עַל־גֶּחָלֶ֖יהָ רֵקָ֑ה לְמַ֨עַן תֵּחַ֜ם וְחָ֣רָה נְחֻשְׁתָּ֗הּ וְנִתְּכָ֤ה בְתוֹכָהּ֙ טֻמְאָתָ֔הּ תִּתֻּ֖ם חֶלְאָתָֽהּ׃	then will I set it empty upon the coals thereof, that it may be hot, and the bottom thereof may burn, and that the impurity of it may be molten in it, that the filth of it may be consumed
12	תְּאֻנִ֖ים הֶלְאָ֑ת וְלֹֽא־תֵצֵ֤א מִמֶּ֙נָּה֙ רַבַּ֣ת חֶלְאָתָ֔הּ בְּאֵ֖שׁ חֶלְאָתָֽהּ׃	It hath wearied itself with toil; yet its great filth goeth not forth out of it, yea, its noisome filth.
13	בְּטֻמְאָתֵ֖ךְ זִמָּ֑ה יַ֤עַן טִֽהַרְתִּיךְ֙ וְלֹ֣א טָהַ֔רְתְּ מִטֻּמְאָתֵךְ֙ לֹ֣א תִטְהֲרִי־ע֔וֹד עַד־הֲנִיחִ֥י אֶת־חֲמָתִ֖י בָּֽךְ׃	Because of thy filthy lewdness, because I have purged thee and thou wast not purged, thou shalt not be purged from thy filthiness any more, till I have satisfied My fury upon thee.
14	אֲנִ֨י יְהֹוָ֤ה דִּבַּ֙רְתִּי֙ בָּאָ֣ה וְעָשִׂ֔יתִי לֹא־אֶפְרַ֥ע וְלֹא־אָח֖וּס וְלֹ֣א אֶנָּחֵ֑ם כִּדְרָכַ֤יִךְ וְכַעֲלִילוֹתַ֙יִךְ֙ שְׁפָט֔וּךְ נְאֻ֖ם אֲדֹנָ֥י יֱהֹוִֽה׃ {פ}	I the LORD have spoken it; it shall come to pass, and I will do it; I will not go back, neither will I spare, neither will I repent; according to thy ways, and according to thy doings, shall they judge thee, saith the Lord GOD.’

== Verses 15-27 ==
On the death of his wife, the prophet abstains from all mourning, providing "a sign of the silent stupefaction which the news of the city’s fall will occasion".

=== Verse 24 ===
"Thus Ezekiel is a sign to you; according to all that he has done you shall do;

and when this comes, you shall know that I am the Lord God." (NKJV)

- "When this comes": medieval commentator Rashi interprets "this" as "the evil".

== See also ==
- Babylon
- Ezekiel
- Jerusalem
- Tevet
- Related Bible parts: 2 Kings 25, Jeremiah 39, Jeremiah 52, Ezekiel 11, 2 Corinthians 1

== Sources ==
- Bromiley, Geoffrey W. (1995). International Standard Bible Encyclopedia: vol. iv, Q-Z. Eerdmans. ISBN 9780802837844.
- Brown, Francis; Briggs, Charles A.; Driver, S. R. (1994). The Brown-Driver-Briggs Hebrew and English Lexicon (reprint ed.). Hendrickson Publishers. ISBN 978-1565632066.
- Clements, Ronald E (1996). Ezekiel. Westminster John Knox Press. ISBN 9780664252724.
- Gesenius, H. W. F. (1979). Gesenius' Hebrew and Chaldee Lexicon to the Old Testament Scriptures: Numerically Coded to Strong's Exhaustive Concordance, with an English Index. Translated by Tregelles, Samuel Prideaux (7th ed.). Baker Book House.
- Joyce, Paul M. (2009). Ezekiel: A Commentary. Continuum. ISBN 9780567483614.
- Kee, Howard Clark; Meyers, Eric M.; Rogerson, John; Levine, Amy-Jill; Saldarini, Anthony J. (2008). Chilton, Bruce (ed.). The Cambridge Companion to the Bible (2, revised ed.). Cambridge University Press. ISBN 9780521691406.
- Ulrich, Eugene, ed. (2010). The Biblical Qumran Scrolls: Transcriptions and Textual Variants. Brill.
- Würthwein, Ernst (1995). The Text of the Old Testament. Translated by Rhodes, Erroll F. Grand Rapids, MI: Wm. B. Eerdmans. ISBN 0-8028-0788-7.
