= Pele-joez-el-gibbor-abi-ad-sar-shalom =

Prophetic name or title which occurs in Isaiah 9:6 in the Hebrew Bible

Pele-yoez-el-gibbor-abi-ad-sar-shalom (Note: Hebrew: פֶּלֶא יוֹעֵץ אֵל גִּבּוֹר אֲבִיעַד שַׂר־שָׁלוֹם Peleʾ yōʿēṣ ʾēl gībbōr ʾáḇīʿaḏ śar-šālōm) is a prophetic name or title which occurs in Isaiah 9:5 in the Hebrew Bible or Isaiah 9:6 in English Bibles. It is one of a series of prophetic names found in chapters 7, 8 and 9 of the Book of Isaiah, including most notably Immanuel (Note: "God with us") and Maher-shalal-hash-baz (Note: Hebrew: מַהֵר שָׁלָל חָשׁ בַּז, "He has made haste to the plunder!") in the previous chapter (Isaiah 8:1–3), which is a reference to the impending plunder of Samaria and Damascus by the king of Assyria.

The meaning of Pele-joez-el-gibbor-abi-ad-sar-shalom is sometimes interpreted as "Wonderful in counsel is God the mighty, the Everlasting Father, the Ruler of Peace" (Hertz 1968).

== Translation ==
Hebrew	Transliteration	English
פֶּלֶא	pe-leʾ	wonder
יוֹעֵץ	yō-ʿēṣ	counselor or he counsels; Targum renders plan.
אֵל	ʾēl	God
גִּבּוֹר	gīb-bōr	mighty or hero
אֲבִי-	ʾáḇī-	father of
-עַד	-ʿaḏ	eternal
שַׂר	śar	prince
שָׁלוֹם	šā-lōm	peace

The name is translated in the Latin Vulgate and most English Bibles. The name could be left untranslated, and is so in the Jewish Publication Society of America Version (1917), though this caused discussion among the translators and led to an English translation in the New Jewish Publication Society of America Version (1985). The Latin Vulgate reads that his name will be called "Admirabilis consiliarius, Deus fortis, Pater futuri saeculi, Princeps pacis" (the Douay-Rheims version translates this as 'Wonderful, Counsellor, God the Mighty, the Father of the world to come, the Prince of Peace').

Wycliffe Bible 9:6 Forsooth a little child is born to us, and a son is given to us, and princehood is made on his shoulder (But a little child is born to us, and a son is given to us, and princehood is placed upon his shoulders); and his name shall be called Wonderful, A counsellor, God, Strong, Father of the world to coming, A prince of peace.

The Masoretic cantillation marks imply pauses after Pele, gibbor, and ad, perhaps for the meaning, "Wonder, adviser to the mighty God. . ."; however the Versions and the traditional rabbinic commentaries agree that Pele yoetz should be read as a phrase, "Designer of wonders."

=== El-gibbor ===
The uncommon term "El-gibbor" is typically translated into English as "Mighty God" (e.g. King James Version; cf. Isaiah 10:21) or occasionally as "Powerful God" (e.g. New Century Version). Martin Luther translated "El gibbor" as "hero" (Held):

Denn uns ist ein Kind geboren, ein Sohn ist uns gegeben, und die Herrschaft ist auf seiner Schulter; er heißt Wunderbar, Rat, Held, Ewig-Vater Friedefürst.

== Jewish interpretation ==
Edersheim (1883) notes that this verse is applied to the Messiah in the Aramaic Targum. In rabbinical interpretation, such as Joseph Herman Hertz (1968) citing Rashi and Luzzatto, the name is taken as referring to the 'crown prince.' Rashi, having applied Emmanuel to Hezekiah also applies the Pele Yoez, "Wonderful Counsellor" prophecy to Hezekiah, saying that God "called the name of Hezekiah "Prince of Peace"." In the Greek Septuagint the name is translated, "Messenger of Great Counsel" as a description of the prince: "he shall be named Messenger of Great Counsel, for I will bring peace upon the rulers, peace and health to him."

== Christian interpretation ==
In Christian interpretation, based partly on the proximity of a quote of Isaiah 9:2 found in Matthew 4, the name is taken as referring to Jesus and Messianic prophecy. The Cambridge Bible for Schools and Colleges argues that the term "Hero-God" is preferable to "Mighty God" here and similarly in Isaiah 10:21.

The full verse (Note: "For unto us a child is born, unto us a son is given: and the government shall be upon his shoulder: and his name shall be called Wonderful, Counsellor, The mighty God, The everlasting Father, The Prince of Peace" (KJV)) is quoted in the libretto of Handel's Messiah.
