= Manea =

Manea may refer to:

- Manea (name), both a surname and a given name
- MANEA, an enzyme
- Manea, Cambridgeshire, a village in the District of Fenland, Cambridgeshire, England
- Manea River, a tributary of the Crasna River in Romania
- Manea or Mania, a Roman and Etruscan deity
- a singular form of Romanian music genre Manele

== See also ==
- Mania (disambiguation)
