= Virgin birth of Jesus =

Belief that Jesus was born to a virgin woman

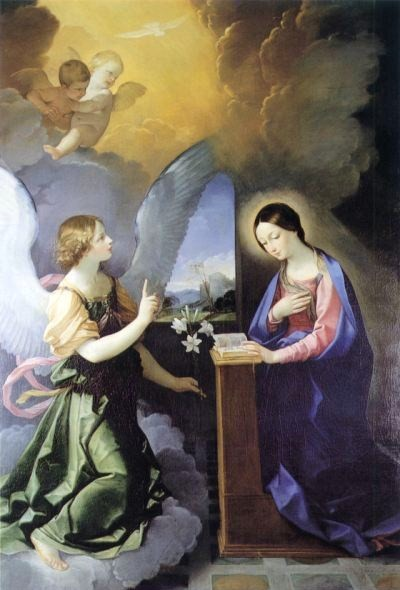
The Annunciation as depicted by Guido Reni, 1621

In Christianity and Islam, it is asserted that Jesus of Nazareth was conceived by his mother Mary solely through divine intervention and without sexual intercourse, thus resulting in his virgin birth. In accordance with these beliefs, Jesus had just one biological parent; Mary's husband Joseph was his father only in the familial and legal sense. Most Christians hold that Mary's virginity was perpetual. Though not biologically related, Jesus being Joseph's adoptive son is cited as linking him to the Davidic line.

The Christian understanding is that the birth of Jesus by a virgin woman was made possible by the Holy Spirit of the Trinity. Christians regard the doctrine as an explanation of the combination of the human and divine natures emanating from Jesus Christ. The Eastern Orthodox Churches accept the doctrine as authoritative by reason of its inclusion in the Nicene Creed, and the Catholic Church holds it authoritative for faith through the Apostles' Creed as well as the Nicene. Nevertheless, there are many contemporary churches in which it is considered orthodox to accept the virgin birth, but not heretical to deny it.

In the New Testament, narratives that include the virgin birth appear only in Matthew 1:18–25 and Luke 1:26–38, and the modern scholarly consensus is that it rests on slender historical foundations, though conservative scholars maintain its historicity. The ancient world did not possess the thoroughly modern understanding that a male's sperm and a female's egg are both needed to form an embryo, although in the apocryphal Gospel of the Birth of Mary, Mary is reported to remark that she "[cannot] bear a child without the addition of a man's seed". This cultural milieu was conducive to many stories of miraculous births, and tales of virgin birth and the impregnation of mortal women by deities were well known in the 1st-century Greco-Roman world and Second Temple Jewish world.

The Islamic understanding of this event comes from the Quran, which also asserts the virgin birth of Jesus. According to Richard Bell, the Quran derives its narrative from the 2nd-century Protoevangelium of James. However, it explicitly rejects the Trinitarian interpretation of the Christian account, instead claiming that Jesus was nothing more than a human in service to God as a prophet and messenger.

== New Testament narratives: Matthew and Luke ==
=== Matthew 1:18-25 ===
18: Now the birth of Jesus the Messiah took place in this way. When his mother Mary had been engaged to Joseph, but before they lived together, she was found to be with child from the Holy Spirit.
19: Her husband Joseph, being a righteous man and unwilling to expose her to public disgrace, planned to dismiss her quietly.
20: But just when he had resolved to do this, an angel of the Lord appeared to him in a dream and said, "Joseph, son of David, do not be afraid to take Mary as your wife, for the child conceived in her is from the Holy Spirit.
21: She will bear a son, and you are to name him Jesus, for he will save his people from their sins."
22: All this took place to fulfill what had been spoken by the Lord through the prophet:
23: "Look, the virgin shall conceive and bear a son, and they shall name him Emmanuel," which means, "God is with us."
24: When Joseph awoke from sleep, he did as the angel of the Lord commanded him; he took her as his wife,
25: but had no marital relations with her until she had borne a son; and he named him Jesus.

=== Luke 1:26-38 ===
26: In the sixth month the angel Gabriel was sent by God to a town in Galilee called Nazareth,
27: to a virgin engaged to a man whose name was Joseph, of the house of David. The virgin's name was Mary.
28: And he came to her and said, "Greetings, favored one! The Lord is with you."
29: But she was much perplexed by his words and pondered what sort of greeting this might be.
30: The angel said to her, "Do not be afraid, Mary, for you have found favor with God.
31: And now, you will conceive in your womb and bear a son, and you will name him Jesus.
32: He will be great, and will be called the Son of the Most High, and the Lord God will give to him the throne of his ancestor David.
33: He will reign over the house of Jacob forever, and of his kingdom there will be no end."
34: Mary said to the angel, "How can this be, since I am a virgin?"
35: The angel said to her, "The Holy Spirit will come upon you, and the power of the Most High will overshadow you; therefore the child to be born will be holy; he will be called Son of God.
36: And now, your relative Elizabeth in her old age has also conceived a son; and this is the sixth month for her who was said to be barren.
37: For nothing will be impossible with God."
38: Then Mary said, "Here am I, the servant of the Lord; let it be with me according to your word." Then the angel departed from her.

== Texts ==
In the entire Christian corpus, the virgin birth is found only in the Gospel of Matthew and the Gospel of Luke. The two agree that Mary's husband was named Joseph, that he was of the Davidic line, and that he played no role in Jesus's divine conception, but beyond this they are very different. Matthew does not mention any census, shepherds, or presentation in the temple, and implies that Joseph and Mary were living in Bethlehem at the time of the birth, while Luke does not mention any magi, flight into Egypt, or massacre of the infants, and states that Joseph lived in Nazareth.

Matthew underlines the virginity of Mary by references to the Book of Isaiah (using the Greek translation in the Septuagint, rather than the Hebrew Masoretic Text) and by his narrative statement that Joseph had no sexual relations with her until after the birth, a choice of words which leaves open the possibility that they did have relations after that. Luke introduces Mary as a virgin, describes her puzzlement at being told she will bear a child despite her lack of sexual experience, and informs the reader that this pregnancy is to be effected through God's Holy Spirit.

There is a serious debate as to whether Luke's nativity story is an original part of his gospel. Some scholars have argued that Chapters 1 and 2 were written in a style quite different from the rest of the gospel, and the dependence of the birth narrative on the Greek Septuagint is absent from the remainder. There are strong Lukan motifs in Luke 1–2, but differences are equally striking—Jesus's identity as "son of David", for example, is a prominent theme of the birth narrative, but not in the rest of the gospel. Other scholars argued Semitisms occur throughout the Gospel of Luke, not just in chapters 1–2, with especially dense concentrations in chapters 4, 5, 7, 9–10, 13–19, and 24. In the early part of the 2nd century, the gnostic theologian Marcion produced a version of Luke lacking these two chapters, and although he is generally accused of having cut them out of a longer text more like our own, genealogies and birth narratives are also absent from Mark and John.

== Cultural context ==
Matthew 1:18 says that Mary was betrothed to Joseph. According to custom, the wedding would take place twelve months later, after which the groom would take his bride from her father's house to his own. A betrothed girl who had sex with a man other than her husband-to-be was considered an adulteress. If tried before a tribunal, both she and the man would be stoned to death, but it was possible for her betrothed husband to issue a document of repudiation, and this, according to Matthew, was the course Joseph wished to take prior to the visitation by the angel.

The most likely cultural context for both Matthew and Luke is Jewish Christian or mixed Gentile/Jewish-Christian circles rooted in Jewish tradition. These readers would have known that the Roman Senate had declared Julius Caesar a god and his successor Augustus to be divi filius, the "son of god", before he became a god himself on his death in AD 14; this remained the pattern for later emperors. Imperial divinity was accompanied by suitable miraculous birth stories, with Augustus being fathered by the god Apollo while his human mother slept, and her human husband being granted a dream in which he saw the sun rise from her womb, and inscriptions even described the news of the divine imperial birth as evangelia, the gospel. The virgin birth of Jesus was thus a direct challenge to a central claim of Roman imperial theology, namely the divine conception and descent of the emperors.

Matthew's genealogy, tracing Jesus's Davidic descent, was intended for Jews, while his virgin birth story was intended for a Greco-Roman audience familiar with virgin birth stories and stories of women impregnated by gods. The ancient world had no understanding that male semen and female ovum were both needed to form a zygote; instead, they thought that the male contribution in reproduction consisted of some sort of formative or generative principle, while female bodily fluids would provide all the matter that was needed for a baby's bodily form, including male sex. This cultural milieu was conducive to miraculous birth stories – they were common in biblical tradition going back to Abraham and Sarah (and the conception of Isaac).

Such stories are less frequent in Judaism, but there too was a widespread belief in angels and divine intervention in births. Theologically, the two accounts mark the moment when Jesus becomes the Son of God, i.e., at his birth, in distinction to Mark, for whom the Sonship dates from Jesus's baptism, and Paul and the pre-Pauline Christians for whom Jesus becomes the Son only at the Resurrection or even the Second Coming.

Tales of virgin birth and the impregnation of mortal women by deities were well known in the 1st-century Greco-Roman world, and Second Temple Jewish works were also capable of producing accounts of the appearances of angels and miraculous births for ancient heroes such as Melchizedek, Noah, and Moses. Luke's virgin birth story is a standard plot from the Jewish scriptures, as for example in the annunciation scenes for Isaac and for Samson, in which an angel appears and causes apprehension, gives reassurance, and announces the coming birth, the mother raises an objection, and the angel gives a sign. Nevertheless, "plausible sources that tell of virgin birth in areas convincingly close to the gospels' own probable origins have proven extremely hard to demonstrate". Similarly, while it is widely accepted that there is a connection with Zoroastrian sources underlying Matthew's story of the Magi (the wise men from the East) and the Star of Bethlehem, a wider claim that Zoroastrianism formed the background to the infancy narratives has not achieved acceptance.

== Historicity and sources of the narratives ==
The modern scholarly consensus is that the doctrine of the virgin birth rests on slender historical foundations. Both Matthew and Luke are compositions dating from the period AD 80–90, though this still places them within the lifetimes of eyewitnesses, including Jesus's own family. Marcus Borg stated, "I (and most mainline scholars) do not see these stories as historically factual." E. P. Sanders described the birth narratives of Matthew and Luke as "the clearest cases of invention" in the Gospels.

The earliest Christian writings, the Pauline epistles, do not contain any mention of a virgin birth and simply state that he was "born of a woman" and "born under the law" like any Jew. In the later epistle 1 Timothy, the author urges that "certain persons" should not "occupy themselves with myths and endless genealogies which promote speculations..." 1 Timothy 1:4. Some scholars have seen this passage as reflecting a negative view of the developing virgin birth stories and their variant genealogies.

Though the author of the Gospel of John is confident that Jesus is more than human, he makes no reference to a virgin birth to prove his point. John in fact refers twice to Jesus as the "son of Joseph," the first time from the lips of the disciple Philip ("We have found him about whom Moses in the law and also the prophets wrote, Jesus, son of Joseph from Nazareth" – John 1:45), the second from the unbelieving Jews ("Is this not Jesus, the son of Joseph, whose mother and father we know?" – John 6:42). These quotations, incidentally, appear to be in direct opposition to the suggestion that Jesus was, or was believed to be, illegitimate: Philip and the Jews knew that Jesus had a human father, and that father was Joseph.

This raises the question of where the authors of Matthew and Luke found their stories. Luke claims to be based upon eyewitness testimonies. Joseph dominates Matthew's and Mary dominates Luke's narrative; James Barker suggests that Luke intended to supplement Matthew’s nativity by adding Mary’s perspective to Matthew’s Joseph, while Brown views it as no more than a pious deduction. Hurtado and Hultgren argue that the infancy narratives cannot be harmonized, precluding a single source for the two, but there are many agreements as well, suggesting that both stories use sources stemming from Palestinian Jewish Christianity; the historical memory of an early birth may lie behind the virgin birth story. A growing number of scholars defend the Farrer hypothesis where Luke used Matthew as a source or the Matthean Posteriority hypothesis where Matthew was aware of Luke. Larry Hurtado argues that the two narratives were created by the two writers, drawing on ideas in circulation at least a decade before the gospels were composed, to perhaps 65-75 or even earlier. Dale Allison and W. D. Davies argue that Matthew presents with minimal redaction a unified and preexisting infancy narrative. They view the infancy story as based on haggadic legends about Moses, though they maintain that elements in the story such as the names of Mary and Joseph and the location of Jesus in Nazareth during the end of Herod’s reign are historical.

Matthew presents the ministry of Jesus as largely the fulfilment of prophecies from the Book of Isaiah, and Matthew 1:22-23, "All this took place to fulfill what had been spoken by the Lord through the prophet: 'Look, the virgin shall conceive and bear a son...'", is a reference to Isaiah 7:14, "...the Lord himself shall give you a sign: the maiden is with child and she will bear a son..." The Book of Isaiah had been translated into Greek, and from this translation, Matthew uses the Greek word παρθένος (parthenos), which does mean virgin, for the Hebrew עַלְמָה (almah), which scholars agree signifies a girl of childbearing age without reference to virginity. This mistranslation gave the author of Matthew the opportunity to interpret Jesus as the prophesied Immanuel, "God is with us", the divine representative on earth. According to R. T. France, the inclusion of Isaiah 7:14 was an explanatory addition to Matthew's birth narrative, albeit not the inspiration for it. According to Mark Goodacre, the Gospel of Matthew did not base the virgin birth on a mistranslation of Isaiah.

Conservative scholars argue that despite the uncertainty of the details, the gospel birth narratives trace back to historical, or at least much earlier pre-gospel traditions. For instance, according to Ben Witherington:

What we find in Matthew and Luke is not the story of… a [god] descending to earth and, in the guise of a man, mating with a human woman, but rather the story of a miraculous conception without the aid of any man, divine or otherwise. As such, this story is without precedent either in Jewish or pagan literature.

== Theology and development ==
Loewe argues that Matthew and Luke use the virgin birth to mark when Jesus becomes the Son of God in contrast from Paul and Mark, for whom the Sonship dates from Jesus's baptism, Resurrection or Second Coming. However, Larry Hurtado disputes this interpretation and holds that Jesus is already presented as God's son even before his baptism in Mark. The Ebionites, a Jewish Christian sect, saw Jesus as fully human, rejected the virgin birth, and preferred to translate almah as "young woman". The 2nd century gnostic theologian Marcion likewise rejected the virgin birth, but regarded Jesus as descended fully formed from heaven and having only the appearance of humanity. By about AD 180 some Jews suggested that Jesus had been illegitimately conceived by a Roman soldier named Pantera or Pandera, whose name is likely a pun on parthenos, virgin. The story was still current in the Middle Ages in satirical parody of the Christian gospels called the Toledot Yeshu. The Toledot Yeshu contains little historical material, and was probably created as a tool for warding off conversions to Christianity.

According to Kärkkäinen, the virgin birth in relation to the incarnation was seen as proof of the divinity of Christ but the Age of Enlightenment offered a full-scale rebuttal of the doctrine, and the only way for classical liberals to continue believing the virgin birth was to resort to the notion of myth, though this elicited a vigorous reaction from conservatives. This division remains in place, although some national synods of the Catholic Church have replaced a biological understanding with the idea of "theological truth", and some evangelical theologians hold it to be marginal rather than indispensable to the Christian faith. Today, the traditional doctrine of the virgin birth is still defended by conservative theologians.

== Celebrations and devotions ==
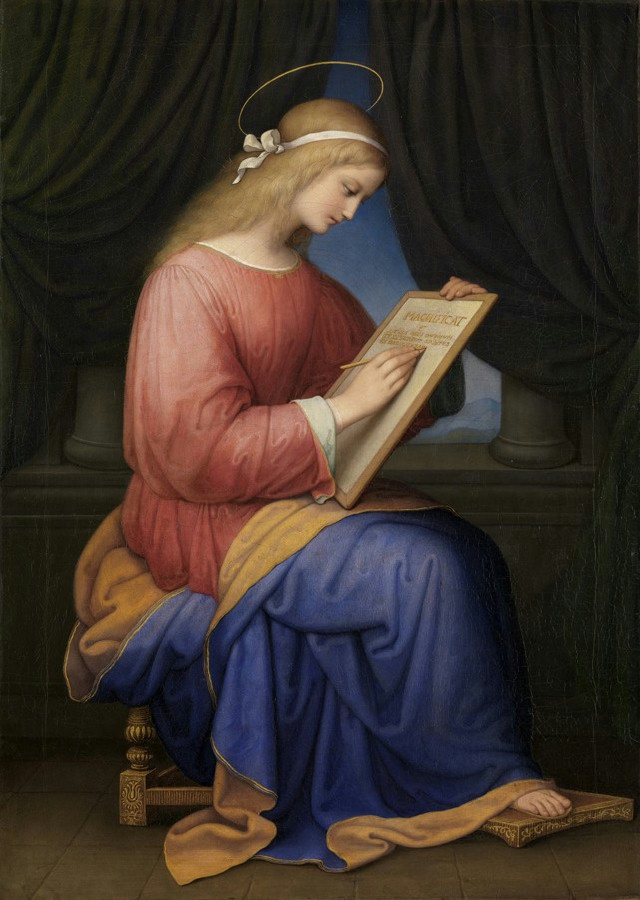
Mary writing the Magnificat, by Marie Ellenrieder, 1833

Most Christians traditionally celebrate the conception of Jesus on 25 March and his birth on 25 December. The Magnificat, based on Luke 1:46-55 is one of four well known Gospel canticles: the Benedictus and the Magnificat in the first chapter, and the Gloria in Excelsis and the Nunc dimittis in the second chapter of Luke, which are now an integral part of the Christian liturgical tradition. The Annunciation became an element of Marian devotions in medieval times, and by the 13th century direct references to it were widespread in French lyrics. The Eastern Orthodox Church uses the title "Ever Virgin Mary" as a key element of its Marian veneration, and as part of the Akathists hymns to Mary which are an integral part of its liturgy.

The doctrine is often represented in Christian art in terms of the Annunciation to Mary by the Archangel Gabriel that she would conceive a child to be born the Son of God, and in Nativity scenes that include the figure of Salome. The Annunciation is one of the most frequently depicted scenes in Western art. Annunciation scenes also amount to the most frequent appearances of Gabriel in medieval art. The depiction of Joseph turning away in some Nativity scenes is a discreet reference to the fatherhood of the Holy Spirit and the virgin birth.

== In Islam ==
According to Richard Bell, the Quran follows the apocryphal gospels, and especially in the Protoevangelium of James, in its accounts of the miraculous births of both Mary and her son Jesus, but while it affirms the virgin birth of Jesus it denies the Trinitarian implications of the gospel story (Jesus is a messenger of God but also a human being and not the second person of the Christian Trinity). In accordance with Gabriel Said Reynolds, Surah Al Imran 3:35-36 parallels the Protoevangelium closely when describing how the pregnant "wife of Imran" (that is, Mary's mother) dedicates her unborn child to God, Mary's secluded upbringing within the Temple, and the angels who bring her food.

== Gallery ==
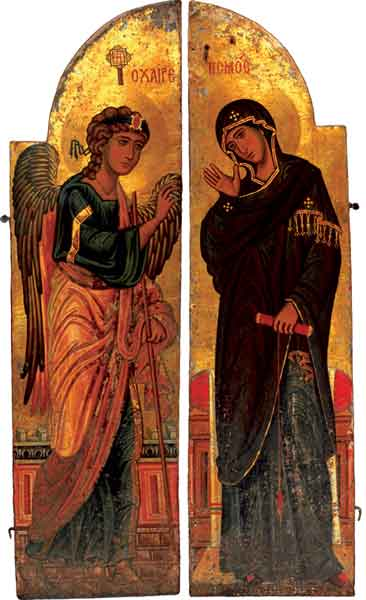
Holy Doors, Saint Catherine's Monastery on Mount Sinai in Egypt, 12th century

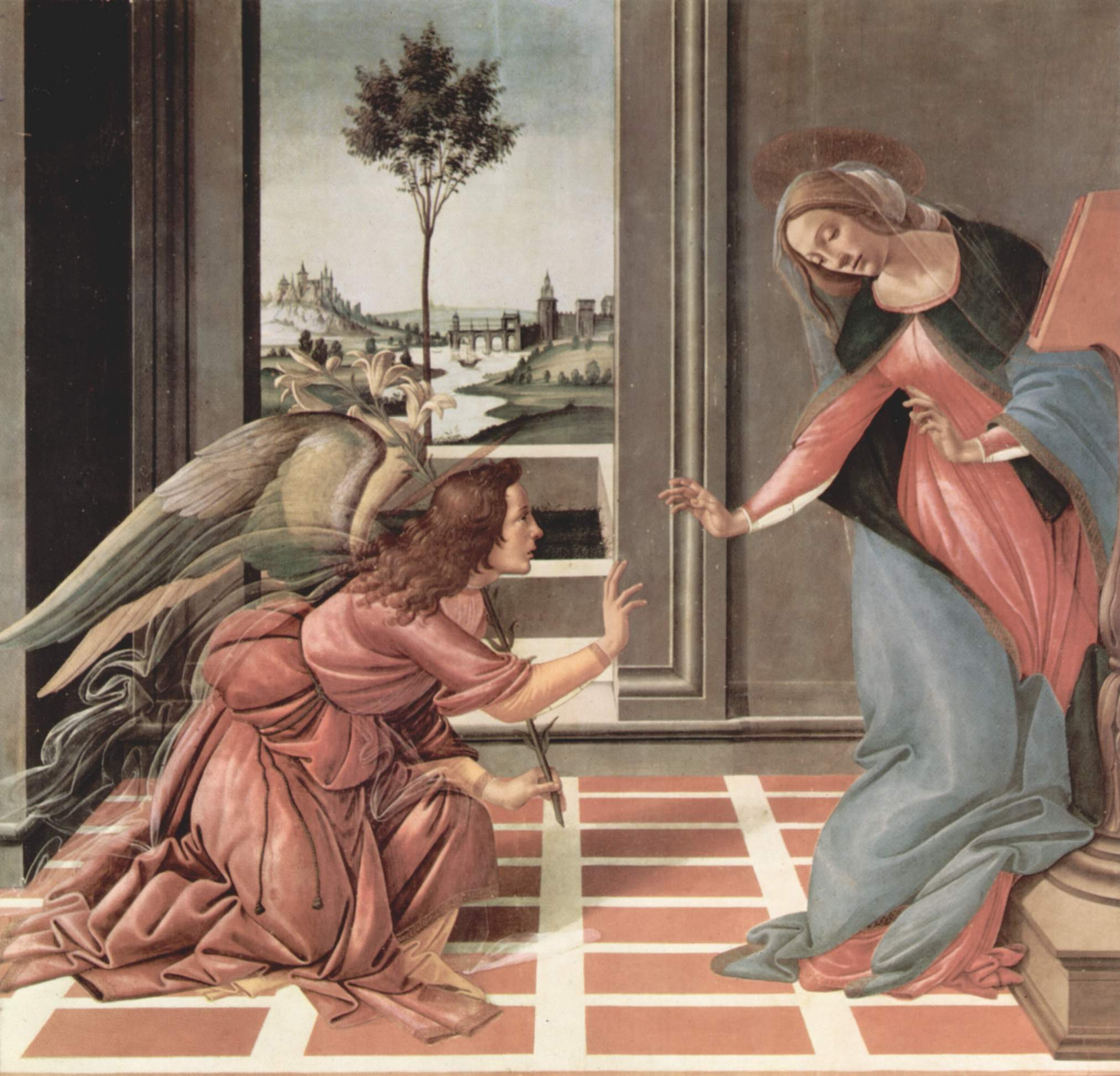
Sandro Botticelli (1489–90)

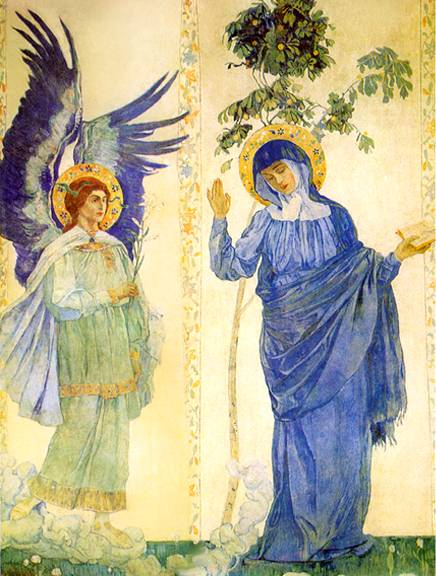
Mikhail Nesterov, Russia, 19th century

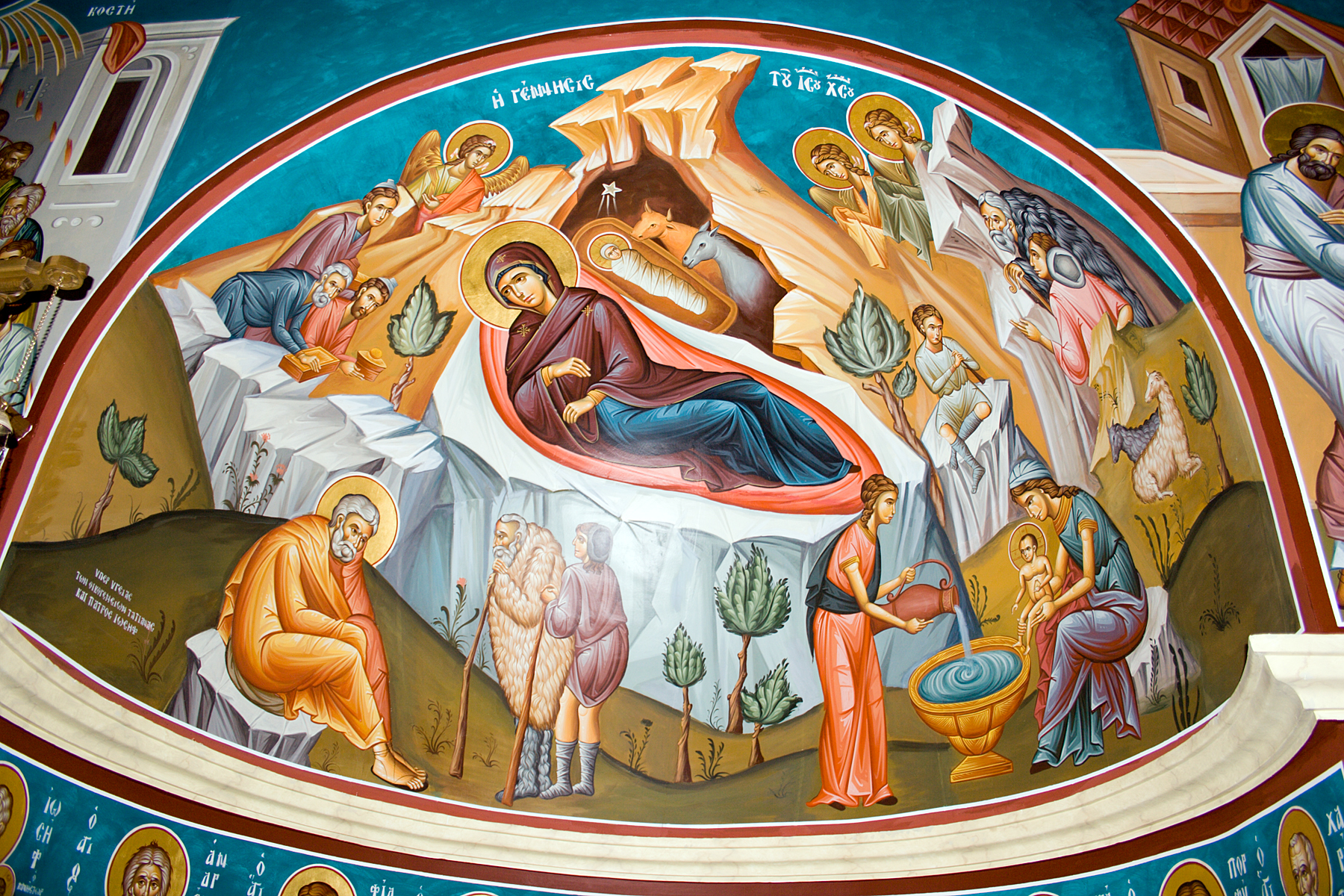
Eastern Orthodox Nativity depiction little changed in more than a millennium

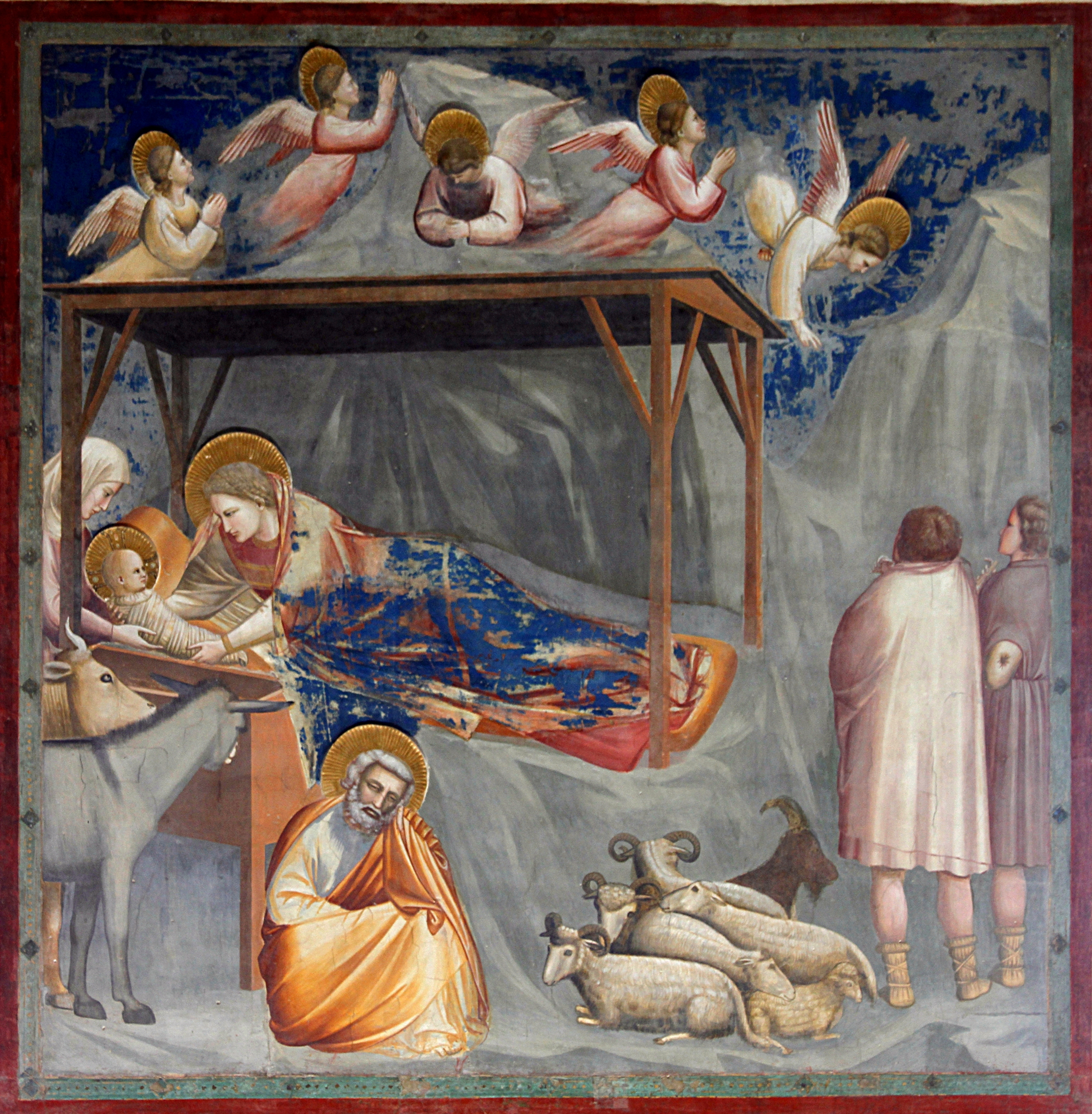
Giotto (1267–1337): Nativity with an uninvolved Joseph but without Salome

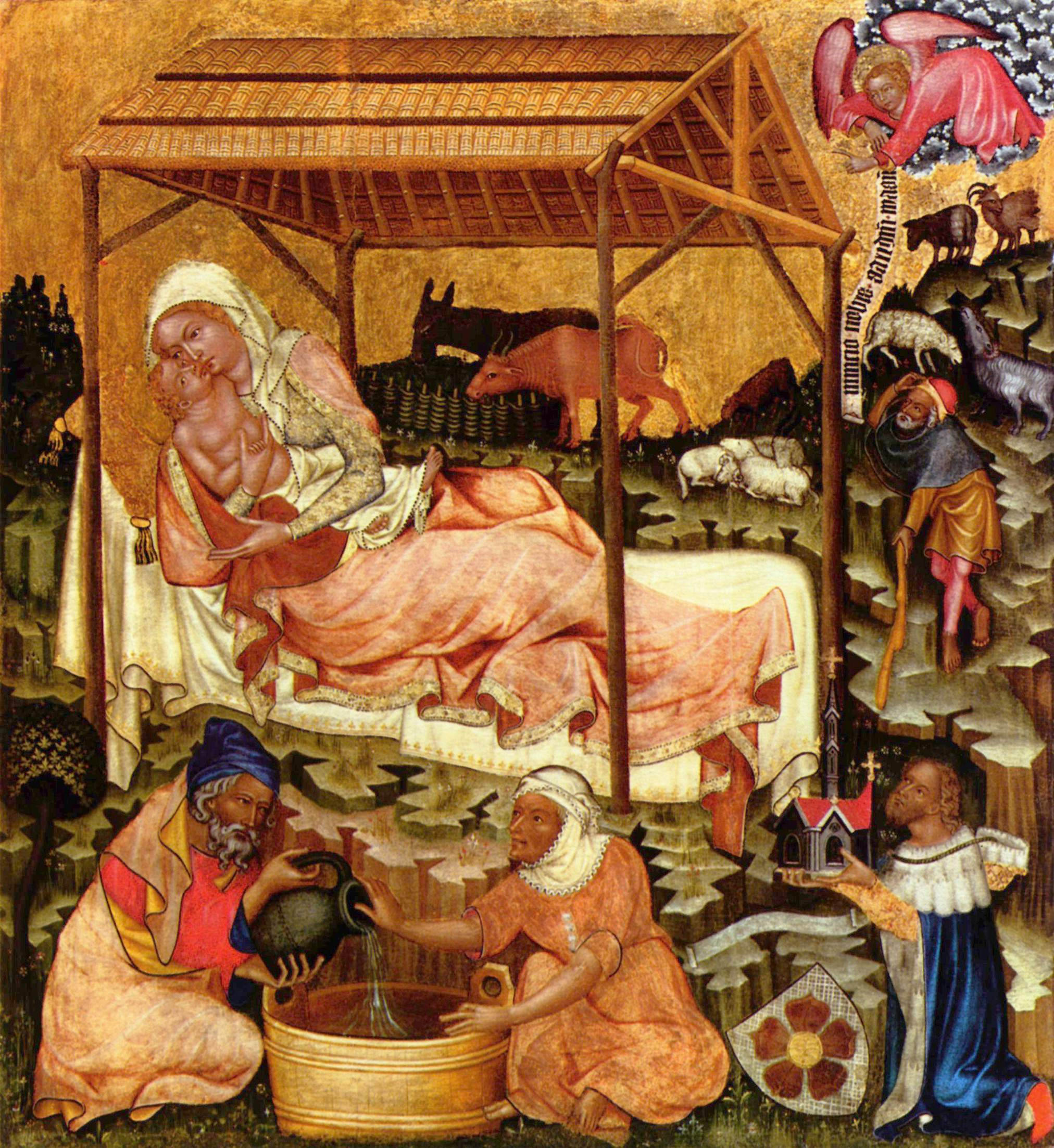
Medieval miniature of the Nativity, c. 1350

== See also ==
- Adoptionism
- Almah
- Christmas
- Christology
- Denial of the virgin birth of Jesus
- Immaculate Conception of Mary
- Incarnation (Christianity)
- Isaiah 7:14
- Perpetual virginity of Mary
- Parthenogenesis

Virgin birth of Jesus Life of Jesus
Preceded by Gabriel announces John's birth to Zechariah	New Testament; Events	Succeeded by Mary visits Elisabeth
