= Isaiah 7:14 =

Verse in the seventh chapter of the Book of Isaiah

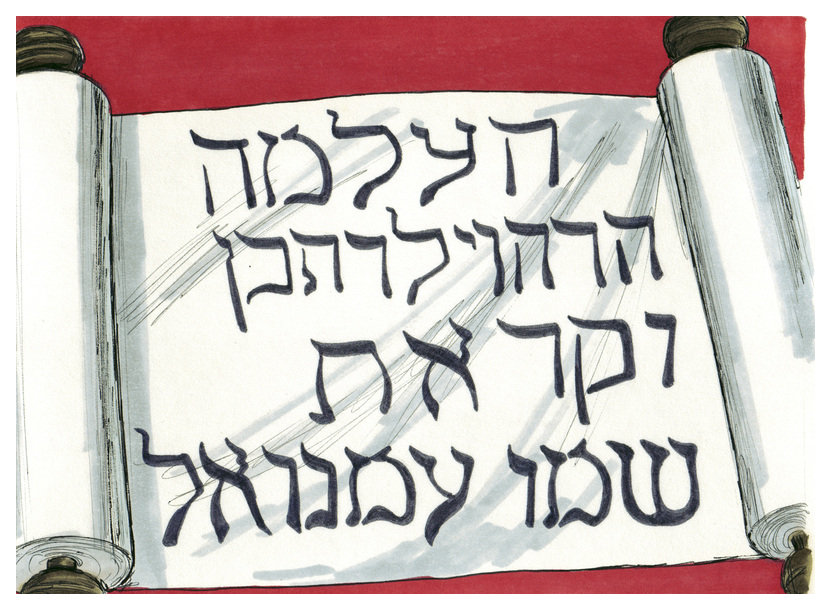
Biblical illustration of Isaiah 7:1

Isaiah 7:14 is a verse in the seventh chapter of the Book of Isaiah in which the prophet Isaiah, addressing king Ahaz of Judah, promises that God will destroy the king's enemies before a child born to an almah is weaned. The Hebrew word עַלְמָה (‘almāh) refers to a "young woman of childbearing age". In the Septuagint, it is translated as παρθένος (parthenos), meaning virgin, and was subsequently picked up by the gospel Matthew as a messianic prophecy of the Virgin birth of Jesus. As the word is used in reference to virgin women elsewhere in the Hebrew Bible, most English translations of the Bible use "virgin" with some exceptions, such as in the Revised Standard Version where "young woman" is used; as such, Isaiah 7:14 continues to be one of the most controversial Bible verses.

== Isaiah's prophesy to Ahaz ==
=== Context: Isaiah 7:1-25 ===
The Book of Isaiah was assembled over several centuries, beginning in the 8th century BC. Chapters 1-39 refer mostly to events of the 8th century, but Isaiah 7:1-25 are the product of a 7th-century Josianic redaction (i.e., an editing in the reign of King Josiah, c. 640–609 BC). They present the 8th-century King Ahaz (reigned c. 732–716 BC) as a faithless monarch who rejects God's promise of protection for his dynasty and city, but the purpose of the original 8th-century narrative was to dissuade Ahaz's son, Hezekiah, from entering into alliance with other kingdoms to oppose the Assyrian Empire, the regional hegemon of the day. The following analysis of the text is based on the Masoretic Text.

=== The oracle: Isaiah 7:1-10 ===
Isaiah 7:1–8:15 deals with the prophet Isaiah's attempt to persuade King Ahaz not to join the kings of Israel (also called Ephraim) and Syria (Aram-Damascus) in their rebellion against their Assyrian overlord. Isaiah 7:1-8 make up a prologue explaining that Israel and Syria have laid siege to Jerusalem in an effort to replace him with a non-Davidic king who will join them.

When Ahaz ... was king of Judah, Rezin, king of Syria, and Pekah ... king of Israel, marched on Jerusalem, they were unable to prevail against it. When the House of David was told that Syria had allied itself with Ephraim, their hearts and the hearts of their people trembled ... But the Lord said to Isaiah, "Go out to meet Ahaz, you and Shearjashub your son, ... and say to him, 'Be firm and keep calm ...' In the face of the threat God announces to Ahaz: 'It will not succeed, it will not happen.'

=== God's sign: Isaiah 7:11-16 ===
Having delivered God's message Isaiah tells Ahaz to ask for a sign to confirm that it is a true prophecy, meaning that Ahaz is being called upon to affirm the divine covenant made with the house of David and threatened by the coalition of enemy kings, but Ahaz refuses, and Isaiah replies that he will have a sign whether he asks for it or not:

7:11 יא שְׁאַל-לְךָ אוֹת, מֵעִם יְהוָה אֱלֹהֶיךָ; הַעְמֵק שְׁאָלָה, אוֹ הַגְבֵּהַּ לְמָעְלָה.

"Ask a sign from the Lord your God, from lowest Sheol or from highest heaven."

7:12 יב וַיֹּאמֶר, אָחָז: לֹא-אֶשְׁאַל וְלֹא-אֲנַסֶּה, אֶת-יְהוָה.

But Ahaz said, "I will not ask, and I will not test the Lord."

7:13 יג וַיֹּאמֶר, שִׁמְעוּ-נָא בֵּית דָּוִד: הַמְעַט מִכֶּם הַלְאוֹת אֲנָשִׁים, כִּי תַלְאוּ גַּם אֶת-אֱלֹהָי.

Then he retorted: "Listen, house of David! Is it not enough to try the patience of men? Will you also try the patience of my God?

7:14 יד לָכֵן יִתֵּן אֲדֹנָי הוּא, לָכֶם--אוֹת: הִנֵּה הָעַלְמָה, הָרָה וְיֹלֶדֶת בֵּן, וְקָרָאת שְׁמוֹ, עִמָּנוּ אֵל.

therefore the Lord himself shall give you a sign: the maiden is with child and she will bear a son, and will call his name Immanuel.

7:15 טו חֶמְאָה וּדְבַשׁ, יֹאכֵל--לְדַעְתּוֹ מָאוֹס בָּרָע, וּבָחוֹר בַּטּוֹב.

By the time he learns to reject the bad and choose the good, he will be eating curds and honey.

7:16 טז כִּי בְּטֶרֶם יֵדַע הַנַּעַר, מָאֹס בָּרָע--וּבָחֹר בַּטּוֹב: תֵּעָזֵב הָאֲדָמָה אֲשֶׁר אַתָּה קָץ, מִפְּנֵי שְׁנֵי מְלָכֶיהָ.

For before the child knows to reject the bad and choose the good, desolation will come upon the land of the two kings before whom you now cower."

A sign, in this context, means a special event which confirms the prophet's words. Ahaz's sign is to be the birth of a son to an almah, who will name him Immanuel, "God is with us", but the significance of the sign is not the identity of the child or his mother (scholars agree that "almah" refers to a woman of childbearing age and has nothing to do with virginity) but the meaning of his name ("God is with us") and the role it plays in identifying the length of time before God will destroy the Ephraimite-Syrian coalition (before the child learns right from wrong).

=== Aftermath: Isaiah 7:17-25 ===
Ahaz turned to Assyria to fend off the threat from Israel and Syria, but the price he paid was to become an Assyrian vassal. His son and successor Hezekiah (ruled c. 715-686) rebelled, but the Assyrians devastated his kingdom and put Jerusalem under siege, and Hezekiah was able to save himself only by paying tribute. A century later, in the time of King Josiah, the prophecy of Isaiah was revised to present Ahaz as a faithless king who rejected God's promise of protection, with the result that God brought Assyria to devastate the land until a new and faithful king (presumably Josiah) would arise to restore peace. The added prophesy, describing the devastation that would come upon Judah at some unspecified future date (future, that is, from the perspective of Isaiah and Ahaz) when God would call up Assyria, is given in verses 7:17–25: "In that day every place where there used to be a thousand vines ... will be turned over to thorns and briars".

== Gospel of Matthew ==
The Gospel of Matthew presents Jesus's ministry as largely the fulfilment of prophecies from Isaiah, but in the time of Jesus the Israelite Jews no longer spoke Hebrew, and Isaiah had to be translated into Greek and Aramaic, the two commonly used languages. The Greek translation, the Septuagint, mistranslated the word almah, meaning a young woman of childbearing age who had not yet given birth, as parthenos, which means virgin. This gave the author of Matthew the opportunity to interpret Jesus as the fulfilment of prophecy: he makes Jesus Immanuel, God is with us (Matthew 1:23), the divine representative on earth, and underlines Jesus' status as "Son of God" by asserting that Joseph did not have sexual intercourse with Mary before she gave birth (Matthew 1:25).

There is much debate over the meaning of Isaiah 7:14. Most scholars today agree the Hebrew word 'almah, used in Isaiah, would more accurately be translated as young woman rather than virgin. However, the Septuagint version of Isaiah and the Gospel of Matthew both use the Greek word parthenos, which unambiguously translates as virgin. It is far more likely that Isaiah is referring to the far more immediate future. The Hebrew can even be interpreted to say that the conception in question had already taken place when Isaiah was writing. Craig A. Evans writes that Isaiah 7:14 in its historical context is not about the birth of an awaited messiah, and the prophecy was not intended to be fulfilled seven centuries later, but was already so in the lifetime of King Ahaz. He sees its use in the Gospel of Matthew as a typological association utilizing a pattern interpretive method.

Warren Carter believes the real importance of this verse lies in the wider narrative of Isaiah. He argues that readers of Matthew would be very familiar with Isaiah, and would recognize the context of the reference. The verse occurs when Judah is under threat from the Assyrians. Isaiah promises that God can save Israel from this threat, but if Judah persists in sin and unfaithfulness, then Assyria would be the instrument of God's vengeance. Carter believes that the author of Matthew is using this background as an allegory for his own 1st century AD circumstances under the Roman empire. Immanuel's path if followed will lead to true salvation from Roman imperial domination, but if the messiah is rebuffed that same empire will be God's instrument of punishment for the Jewish people—which the writer of the Gospel considered to be the destruction of the temple in 70 AD.

== Simeon tradition ==
An Orthodox Christian tradition exists which states that one of the seventy scholars who translated the Hebrew Scriptures into the Septuagint was Simeon, and that he translated Isaiah 7:14 as saying "that young woman" has conceived, rather than "a virgin will conceive" due to his disbelief. Because of this, a divine being told him he would live to see the fulfillment of this prophecy. When he was around 360 years old, he saw Jesus, uttered his benediction and died. This tradition aims to explain Luke 2:26, which states that Simeon had been told by the Holy Spirit that "he should not see death before he had seen the Lord's Christ".

== Revised Standard Version ==
When the Revised Standard Version translators rendered "almah" as "young woman" in 1952 it immediately became a center of controversy for conservative Christians, who believed that this passage predicted the virgin birth of Jesus. The RSV quickly replaced the KJV in many churches across America, but fundamentalist American Christians argued that nowhere in the Old Testament was an almah anything other than a young unmarried girl, and one pastor publicly burned a copy of the RSV. Isaiah 7:14 became a litmus test of orthodoxy among conservatives, but most modern Bible translations use "young woman". However, popular Evangelical translations such as the New International Version and the English Standard Version continue to use the word "virgin".

== Uses ==
The King James Version of this verse is cited as texts in the English-language oratorio "Messiah" by George Frideric Handel (HWV 56).

== See also ==
- Jesus and Messianic prophecy
- Maher-shalal-hash-baz
- Matthew 1:23
- Old Testament messianic prophecies quoted in the New Testament
- Pele-joez-el-gibbor-abi-ad-sar-shalom

== Bibliography ==
Barker, Margaret (2001). "Isaiah". In Dunn, James D.G.; Rogerson, John (eds.). Eerdmans Commentary on the Bible. Eerdmans. ISBN 9780802837110.
Childs, Brevard S (2001). Isaiah. Westminster John Knox Press. ISBN 978-0664221430.
Coogan, Michael D. (2007). "Isaiah". In Coogan, Michael D.; Brettler, Mark Zvi; Newsom, Carol Ann (eds.). New Oxford Annotated Bible. Oxford University Press. ISBN 9780195288803.
Ehrman, Bart D. (1999). Jesus: Apocalyptic Prophet of the New Millennium. Oxford University Press. ISBN 978-0-19-512473-6. "Jesus: Apocalyptic Prophet of the New Millennium."
Metzger, Bruce M. (2001). The Bible in Translation. Baker. ISBN 9780801022821.
Rhodes, Ron (2009). The Complete Guide to Bible Translations. Harvest House Publishers. ISBN 978-0736931366.
Saldarini, Anthony J. (2001). "Matthew". In Dunn, James D.G.; Rogerson, John (eds.). Eerdmans Commentary on the Bible. Eerdmans. ISBN 9780802837110.
Sweeney, Marvin A (1996). Isaiah 1–39: with an introduction to prophetic literature. Eerdmans. ISBN 9780802841001.
Moyise, Steve (2013). Was the Birth of Jesus According to Scripture?. Wipf and Stock Publishers. ISBN 978-1621896739.
