= Maher-shalal-hash-baz (disambiguation) =

Maher-shalal-hash-baz (Hebrew: מַהֵר שָׁלָל חָשׁ בַּז) was the second mentioned son of the prophet Isaiah in the Hebrew bible. The phrase may also refer to:

- Mahershala Ali (born 1974), American actor
- Maher Shalal Hash Baz (band), Japanese art music ensemble led by Tori Kudo
