= Glycoprotein endo-alpha-1,2-mannosidase =

Glycoprotein endo-α-1,2-mannosidase

Identifiers
- EC no.: 3.2.1.130
- CAS no.: 108022-16-8

Databases
- IntEnz: IntEnz view
- BRENDA: BRENDA entry
- ExPASy: NiceZyme view
- KEGG: KEGG entry
- MetaCyc: metabolic pathway
- PRIAM: profile
- PDB structures: RCSB PDB PDBe PDBsum
Search
- PMC: articles
- PubMed: articles
- NCBI: proteins

Glycoprotein endo-α-1,2-mannosidase (EC 3.2.1.130, glucosylmannosidase, endo-α-D-mannosidase, endo-α-mannosidase, endomannosidase, glucosyl mannosidase) is an enzyme with systematic name glycoprotein glucosylmannohydrolase. It catalyses the hydrolysis of the terminal α-D-glucosyl-(1,3)-D-mannosyl unit from the GlcMan_{9}(GlcNAc)_{2} oligosaccharide component of the glycoprotein produced in the Golgi membrane.

This protein is involved in the synthesis of glycoproteins.

== See also ==
- MANEA
