= Immanuel =

Hebrew name that appeared in the Book of Isaiah

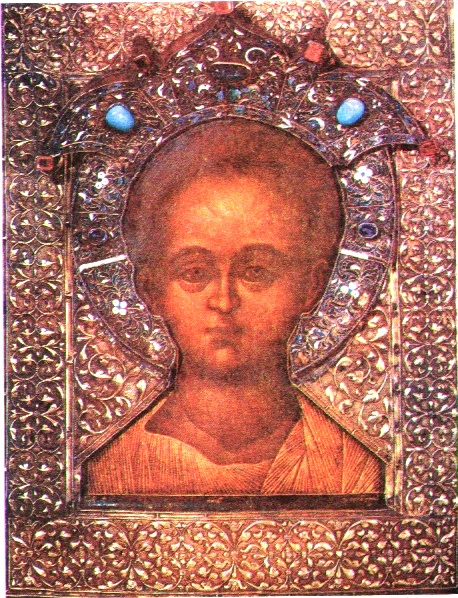
Christ Emmanuel, Christian icon with riza by Simon Ushakov, 1668. According to the Gospel of Matthew, Immanuel refers to Jesus Christ

Immanuel or Emmanuel (Hebrew: עִמָּנוּאֵל, romanized: ʿĪmmānūʾēl, "God [is] with us"; Koine Greek: Ἐμμανουήλ Emmanūēl) is a Hebrew name that appears in the Book of Isaiah (7:14) as a sign that God will protect the House of David.

The Gospel of Matthew (Matthew 1:22–23) interprets this as a prophecy of the birth of the Messiah and the fulfillment of Scripture in the person of Jesus. Immanuel "God (El) with us" is one of the "symbolic names" used by Isaiah, alongside Shearjashub, Maher-shalal-hash-baz, or Pele-joez-el-gibbor-abi-ad-sar-shalom. It has no particular meaning in Jewish messianism.

In Christian theology by contrast, based on its use in Isaiah 7:14, the name has come to be read as a prophecy of the Christ, following Matthew 1:23, where Immanuel (Ἐμμανουὴλ) is translated as μεθ ἡμῶν ὁ Θεός (KJV: "God with us").

== Isaiah 7–8 ==
=== Summary ===
The setting is the Syro-Ephraimite War, 735-734 BCE, which saw the Kingdom of Judah pitted against two northern neighbors, the kingdoms of Israel (called Ephraim in the prophecy) and Syria (also known as Aram or Aram-Damascus or Syria-Damascus). Isaiah 7:1–2 tells how the kings of Ephraim and Syria attack Jerusalem when Ahaz refuses to join them in their anti-Assyrian alliance. Ahaz wishes to ask Assyria for help, but Isaiah, at God's command, takes his son Shear-jashub (a symbolic name meaning "a remnant shall return") and assures Ahaz that the two enemy kings will not succeed (Isaiah 7:3–9). Isaiah tells Ahaz of the apparent sign by which he will know that this is a true prophecy: a young woman will give birth to a child whom she will name Immanuel (another symbolic name, meaning "God with us"), and the lands of the "two kings you dread" will be laid waste before the child is old enough to "reject the wrong and choose the right" (Isaiah 7:13–16).

Isaiah 7:17 follows with a further prophecy that at some unspecified future date God will call up Assyria against Judah: "The Lord will cause to come upon you and your people and your ancestral house such days as have not been seen since Ephraim broke away from Judah—the king of Assyria" (verse 7:17). Verses 7:18–25 describe the desolation that will result: "In that day a man will save alive a young cow and two sheep…in that day every place where there used to be a thousand vines…will be turned over to thorns and briars" (verses 7:21–23). Isaiah 8:1–15 continues the previous chapter: the prophet tells of the birth of another child, his own son named Maher-shalal-hash-baz (a third symbolic name), then predicts that after Ephraim and Syria are destroyed the Assyrians will come like a river in flood to "cover the breadth of your land, Immanuel" (Isaiah 8:8).

A fourth, even longer, prophetic "name", is found in Isaiah 9:6 with "Pele-joez-el-gibbor-abi-ad-sar-shalom". This is generally translated fully in English Bible versions such as "his name shall be called Wonderful, Counsellor, The mighty God, The everlasting Father, The Prince of Peace" (KJV).

=== Interpretation ===
Isaiah 7:1–8:15, is on the surface set in the time of king Ahaz, and a prophecy concerning the two kings whom Ahaz dreads, namely Pekah and Rezin. The defeat and death of both these kings at the hands of the Assyrians is dated around 732 BCE, placing the birth of the Immanuel child late in the reign of Ahaz.

Scholars generally date the written version of these events from the reign of Ahaz's son Hezekiah some thirty years later, the purpose being to persuade Hezekiah not to join with other kings who intended to rebel against their joint overlord, Assyria. Isaiah points to the dreadful consequences that followed for Judah's northern neighbours, the kingdom of Israel and Aram-Damascus (Syria) when they rebelled in the days of Ahaz and brought the Assyrians down on themselves. In the event, Hezekiah ignored Isaiah and joined the rebels, and the prophet's warning came true: the Assyrians ravaged Judah and Hezekiah barely escaped with his throne. A century later, in the time of Josiah, the prophecy was revised to present Ahaz as the faithless king who rejected God's promise of protection for Jerusalem and the house of David, with the result that God brought Assyria to devastate the land until a new and faithful king (presumably Josiah) would arise.

Isaiah 7–8 mentions three children with symbolic names: Shear-jashub, meaning "a remnant shall return"; Immanuel, "God is with us"; and Maher-shalal-hash-baz, "the spoil speeds, the prey hastens". Isaiah 8:18 informs the reader that Isaiah and his children are signs ("Here am I, and the children the Lord has given me. We are signs and symbols in Israel from the Lord Almighty, who dwells on Mount Zion"). The meaning of these name-signs is not clear: Shear-jashub has been variously interpreted to mean that only a remnant of Ephraim and Syria will survive the Assyrian invasion, or that a remnant of Judah will repent and turn to God, while in Isaiah 10:20–23 it seems to mean that a remnant of Israel will return to the Davidic monarchy. Maher-shalal-hash-baz is more clearly related to the expected destruction of Ephraim and Syria. As for Immanuel, "God is with us", Isaiah might mean simply that any young pregnant woman in 734 BCE would be able to name her child "God is with us" by the time he is born; but if a specific child is meant, then it might be a son of Ahaz, possibly his successor Hezekiah (which is the traditional Jewish understanding); or, since the other symbolic children are Isaiah's, Immanuel might be the prophet's own son. However this may be, the significance of the sign changes from Isaiah 7, where Immanuel symbolises the hope of imminent defeat for Syria and Ephraim, to Isaiah 8:8, where Immanuel is addressed as the people whose land is about to be overrun by the Assyrians.

== Matthew 1:20–23 ==
The Gospel of Matthew cites the prophecy of the sign of Immanuel from Isaiah, using a Greek translation rather than the original Hebrew. Matthew begins with a genealogy of Jesus from Abraham through David to Joseph, with Jesus as "the son of David", (Matthew 1:1) a member of the "house of David" (Isaiah 7:12) to whom the sign of Immanuel was given. Matthew 1:16 indicates that Jesus is not Joseph's natural son, and Matthew never refers to Joseph as Jesus's father. Verses 1:18–25 turn to Mary, the future mother of Jesus, betrothed (engaged) to Joseph, but "found with child of the Holy Ghost" before she and Joseph "came together". (v.18) Joseph was about to break the engagement, but an angel appeared to him in a dream and told him of the child's divine origin and told him to call the child Jesus, and in 1:22–23 Matthew declares how this was the fulfillment of the prophecy of Isaiah:

22 Now all this was done, that it might be fulfilled which was spoken of the Lord by the prophet, saying,
23 Behold, a virgin shall be with child, and shall bring forth a son, and they shall call his name Emmanuel, which being interpreted is, God with us.

The gospel of Matthew was written by an author who believed that Jesus was the promised Messiah, "God with us". At first, titles such as "Messiah" and "son of God" had described Jesus's future nature at the "deutera parousia", the Second Coming; but very soon he came to be recognised as having become the Son of God at the resurrection; then, in Mark, he becomes known as Son of God at his baptism; and finally Matthew and Luke add infancy narratives in which Jesus is the Son of God from the very beginning, long before being conceived of a virgin mother without a human father.

== See also ==
- Dominus vobiscum
- Gott mit uns
- List of synagogues named Emanu-El
- Theophory in the Bible
