= Isaiah 9 =

Book of Isaiah, chapter 9

- ← chapter 8 chapter 10 →
- The Great Isaiah Scroll, the best preserved of the biblical scrolls found at Qumran from the second century BC, contains all the verses in this chapter.
- Book: Book of Isaiah
- Hebrew Bible part: Nevi'im
- Order in the Hebrew part: 5
- Category: Latter Prophets
- Christian Bible part: Old Testament
- Order in the Christian part: 23

Isaiah 9 is the ninth chapter of the Book of Isaiah in the Hebrew Bible, which is broadly the base of the Old Testament of the Christian Bible. This book contains the prophecies attributed to the prophet Isaiah, and is one of the Nevi'im.

== Text ==
The original text was written in Hebrew language. This chapter is divided into 21 verses in Christian Bibles, but 20 verses in the Hebrew Bible with the following verse numbering comparison:

Verse numbering for Isaiah 8 and 9
English	Hebrew
9:1	8:23
9:2–21	9:1–20

This article generally follows the common numbering in Christian English Bible versions, with notes to the numbering in Hebrew Bible versions.

=== Textual witnesses ===
Some early manuscripts containing the text of this chapter in Hebrew are of the Masoretic Text tradition, which includes the Codex Cairensis (895), the Petersburg Codex of the Prophets (916), Aleppo Codex (10th century), Codex Leningradensis (1008).

Fragments containing parts of this chapter were found among the Dead Sea Scrolls (3rd century BC or later):

- 1QIsa^{a}: complete
- 4QIsa^{b} (4Q56): extant: verses 10‑11
- 4QIsa^{c} (4Q57): extant: verses 3‑12
- 4QIsa^{e} (4Q59): extant: verses 17‑20

There is also a translation into Koine Greek known as the Septuagint, made in the last few centuries BCE. Extant ancient manuscripts of the Septuagint version include Codex Vaticanus (B; $\mathfrak{G}$^{B}; 4th century), Codex Sinaiticus (S; BHK: $\mathfrak{G}$^{S}; 4th century), Codex Alexandrinus (A; $\mathfrak{G}$^{A}; 5th century) and Codex Marchalianus (Q; $\mathfrak{G}$^{Q}; 6th century).

== Parashot ==
The parashah sections listed here are based on the Aleppo Codex. Isaiah 9 is a part of the Prophecies about Judah and Israel (Isaiah 1-12). {P}: open parashah; {S}: closed parashah; using Hebrew Bible verse numbering:

[{S} 8:19-23] 9:1-6 {P} 9:7-12 {S} 9:13-20 {S}

== The government of the promised son (9:1–7) ==
=== Verse 1 ===
For is there no gloom to her that was stedfast? Now the former hath lightly afflicted the land of Zebulun and the land of Naphtali, but the latter hath dealt a more grievous blow by the way of the sea, beyond the Jordan, in the district of the nations.

— Isaiah 8:23 Hebrew Bible

==== Christian interpretation ====
Nevertheless the dimness shall not be such as was in her vexation, when at the first he lightly afflicted the land of Zebulun and the land of Naphtali, and afterward did more grievously afflict her by the way of the sea, beyond Jordan, in Galilee of the nations.

— Isaiah 9:1 KJV

The Gospel of Matthew chapter 4 (verses 14–15) cites this and the next verse as a fulfillment of Messianic Prophecies of Jesus. In the Greek "by way of the sea" (or "toward the sea") refers to a specific route, and Jones feels it should perhaps be more accurately read as "on the road to the sea." In Isaiah this verse is in the section describing the Assyrian invasion of northern Israel, so "toward the sea, beyond the Jordan" refers to the geography from the view point of the Assyrian invaders. To them the region of Zebulun and Naphtali would be across the Jordan River on the way to the Mediterranean.

=== Verse 2 ===
The people that walked in darkness have seen a great light; they that dwelt in the land of the shadow of death, upon them hath the light shined.

— Isaiah 9:1 Hebrew Bible

The people that walked in darkness have seen a great light: they that dwell in the land of the shadow of death, upon them hath the light shined.

— Isaiah 9:2 KJV

==== Christian interpretation ====
Cross reference: Matthew 4:16

=== Verse 6 ===
For a child is born unto us, a son is given unto us; and the government is upon his shoulder; and his name is called Pele-joez-el-gibbor-Abi-ad-sar-shalom

— Isaiah 9:5–6 Hebrew Bible

==== Jewish interpretation ====
Edersheim (1883) notes that this verse is applied to the Messiah in the Aramaic Targum. In rabbinical interpretation, such as Joseph Herman Hertz (1968) citing Rashi and Luzzatto, the name is taken as referring to the 'crown prince.' Rashi, having applied Emmanuel to Hezekiah also applies the Pele Yoez, "Wonderful Counsellor" prophecy to Hezekiah, saying that God "called the name of Hezekiah "Prince of Peace"." In the Greek Septuagint the name is translated, "Messenger of Great Counsel" as a description of the prince: "he shall be named Messenger of Great Counsel, for I will bring peace upon the rulers, peace and health to him."

==== Christian interpretation ====
For unto us a child is born, unto us a son is given: and the government shall be upon his shoulder: and his name shall be called Wonderful, Counsellor, The mighty God, The everlasting Father, The Prince of Peace.

— Isaiah 9:6 KJV

For a child is born to us, and a son is given to us, whose government is upon his shoulder: and his name is called the Messenger of great counsel: for I will bring peace upon the princes, and health to him.

— lxx Isaiah 9:6 Brenton LXX

- "Wonderful Counselor": Isaiah 5:19; Isaiah 25:1.
- "Mighty God": Isaiah 10:21.
- "Everlasting Father": The New Oxford Annotated Bible interprets it "God as the eternal creator" Isaiah 40:28.
- "Prince of Peace": According to the New Oxford Annotated Bible, it is "a messianic title in Judaism and early Christianity".
- "Messenger of great counsel": is translated as "Angel of the great Council" in The Apostolic Constitutions.

In Christian interpretation, based partly on the proximity of a quote of Isaiah 9:2 found in Matthew 4, the name is taken as referring to Jesus and Messianic prophecy. The full verse "For unto us a child is born, unto us a son is given: and the government shall be upon his shoulder: and his name shall be called Wonderful, Counselor, The mighty God, The everlasting Father, The Prince of Peace." is quoted in the libretto of Handel's Messiah.

The verse is very different in Greek Septuagint, in Ralphs' Septuagint it is "ὅτι παιδίον ἐγεννήθη ἡμῖν, υἱὸς καὶ ἐδόθη ἡμῖν, οὗ ἡ ἀρχὴ ἐγενήθη ἐπὶ τοῦ ὤμου αὐτοῦ, καὶ καλεῖται τὸ ὄνομα αὐτοῦ Μεγάλης βουλῆς ἄγγελος· ἐγὼ γὰρ ἄξω εἰρήνην ἐπὶ τοὺς ἄρχοντας, εἰρήνην καὶ ὑγίειαν αὐτῷ." In it, the Christ is called Angel/Messenger of Great Counsellor

=== Verse 7 ===
That the government may be increased, and of peace there be no end, upon the throne of David, and upon his kingdom, to establish it, and to uphold it through justice and through righteousness from henceforth even for ever. The zeal of the LORD of hosts doth perform this.

— Isaiah 9:6 Hebrew Bible

Of the increase of his government and peace there shall be no end, upon the throne of David, and upon his kingdom, to order it, and to establish it with judgment and with justice from henceforth even for ever. The zeal of the Lord of hosts will perform this.

— Isaiah 9:7 KJV

== The punishment of Samaria (9:8–21) ==
=== Verse 12 ===
The Syrians before, and the Philistines behind; and they shall devour Israel with open mouth. For all this his anger is not turned away, but his hand is stretched out still.

The refrain "For all this ... still" first appeared in Isaiah 5:25 and also appears here as well as in 9:17, 9:21 and 10:4.

=== Verse 14 ===
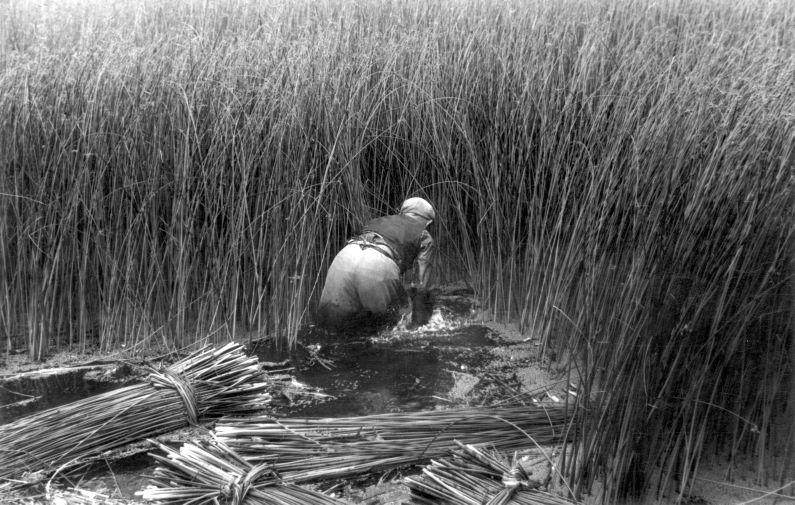
A man cutting bulrush/reed in the Netherlands with bundles of cut reed behind him (c. 1940)

Therefore the Lord will cut off from Israel head and tail,
branch and rush, in one day.

- Cross reference: Isaiah 19:15

This verse uses a metaphor of 'a reed being cut down'.

=== Verse 15 ===
The elder and honorable, he is the head;

The prophet who teaches lies, he is the tail.

- "Honorable": in Hebrew literally "the one lifted up with respect to the face" (cf. 2 Kings 5:1).

=== Verse 16 ===
For the leaders of this people cause them to err,

And those who are led by them are destroyed.

- "And those who are led by them are destroyed": in Hebrew literally "and the ones being led were swallowed up.”

=== Verse 17 ===
Therefore the Lord will have no joy in their young men,

Nor have mercy on their fatherless and widows;

For everyone is a hypocrite and an evildoer,

And every mouth speaks folly.

For all this His anger is not turned away,

But His hand is stretched out still.

- "Speaks folly": that is, "speaks foolishness" or "speaks disgraceful things"

The refrain "For all this ... still" first appeared in Isaiah 5:25 and also appears here as well as in 9:12, 9:21 and 10:4.

=== Verse 21 ===
Manasseh, Ephraim; and Ephraim, Manasseh:

and they together shall be against Judah.

For all this his anger is not turned away,

but his hand is stretched out still.

The refrain "For all this ... still" first appeared in Isaiah 5:25 and also appears here as well as in 9:12, 9:17 and 10:4.

== Uses ==
=== Music ===
The King James Version of verses 2 and 6 from this chapter is cited as texts in the English-language oratorio "Messiah" by George Frideric Handel (HWV 56).

== See also ==
- Galilee
- Jewish messianism
- Messianic prophecies of Jesus
- Related Bible parts: Isaiah 7, Isaiah 8, Isaiah 19, Jeremiah 23, Matthew 4

== Sources ==
- Coggins, R. (2007). "22. Isaiah". In Barton, John; Muddiman, John (eds.). The Oxford Bible Commentary (first (paperback) ed.). Oxford University Press. pp. 433–486. ISBN 978-0199277186.
- Coogan, Michael David; Brettler, Marc Zvi; Newsom, Carol Ann; Perkins, Pheme (2007). The New Oxford Annotated Bible with the Apocryphal/Deuterocanonical Books: New Revised Standard Version. Oxford University Press. ISBN 978-0-19-528880-3.
- France, R.T. (2007). The Gospel of Matthew. Wm. B. Eerdmans. ISBN 978-0-8028-2501-8.
- Jones, Alexander (1965). The Gospel According to St. Matthew. London: Geoffrey Chapman.
- Keener, Craig S. (1999). A Commentary on the Gospel of Matthew. Wm. B. Eerdmans. ISBN 978-0-8028-3821-6.
- Motyer, J. Alec (2015). The Prophecy of Isaiah: An Introduction & Commentary. InterVarsity Press. ISBN 9780830895243.
- Ulrich, Eugene, ed. (2010). The Biblical Qumran Scrolls: Transcriptions and Textual Variants. Brill.
- Würthwein, Ernst (1995). The Text of the Old Testament. Translated by Rhodes, Erroll F. Grand Rapids, MI: Wm. B. Eerdmans. ISBN 0-8028-0788-7.
