= Romans 9 =

- ← chapter 8 chapter 10 →
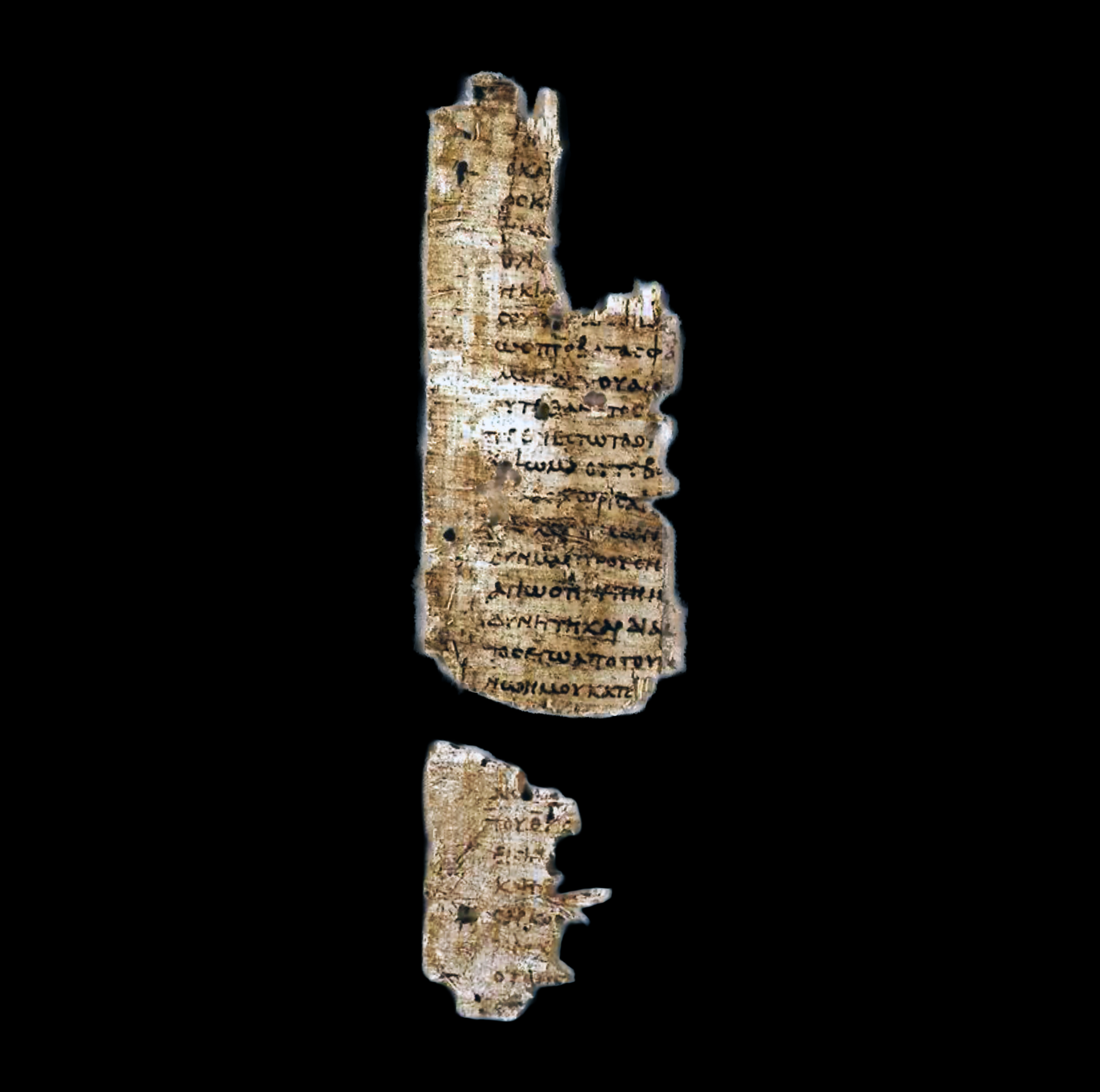
- Epistle to the Romans 8:133–9:9 in Papyrus 27 (verso side), written in the 3rd century
- Book: Epistle to the Romans
- Category: Pauline epistles
- Christian Bible part: New Testament
- Order in the Christian part: 6

Romans 9 is the ninth chapter of the Epistle to the Romans in the New Testament of the Christian Bible. It is authored by Paul the Apostle, while he was in Corinth in the mid-50s AD, with the help of an amanuensis (secretary), Tertius, who adds his own greeting in Romans 16:22.

This chapter is concerned with Paul's vindication of "the faithfulness of God".

The reformer Martin Luther stated that "in chapters 9, 10 and 11, St. Paul teaches us about the eternal providence of God. It is the original source which determines who would believe and who wouldn't, who can be set free from sin and who cannot".

Methodist writer Joseph Benson summarizes this chapter:

The apostle having insinuated, in Romans 3:3, that God would cast off the Jews for their unbelief, a Jew is there supposed to object, that their rejection would destroy the faithfulness of God. To this the apostle answered, that the faithfulness of God would be established rather than destroyed, by the rejection of the Jews for their unbelief.

== Text ==
The original text was written in Koine Greek. This chapter is divided into 33 verses.

=== Textual witnesses ===
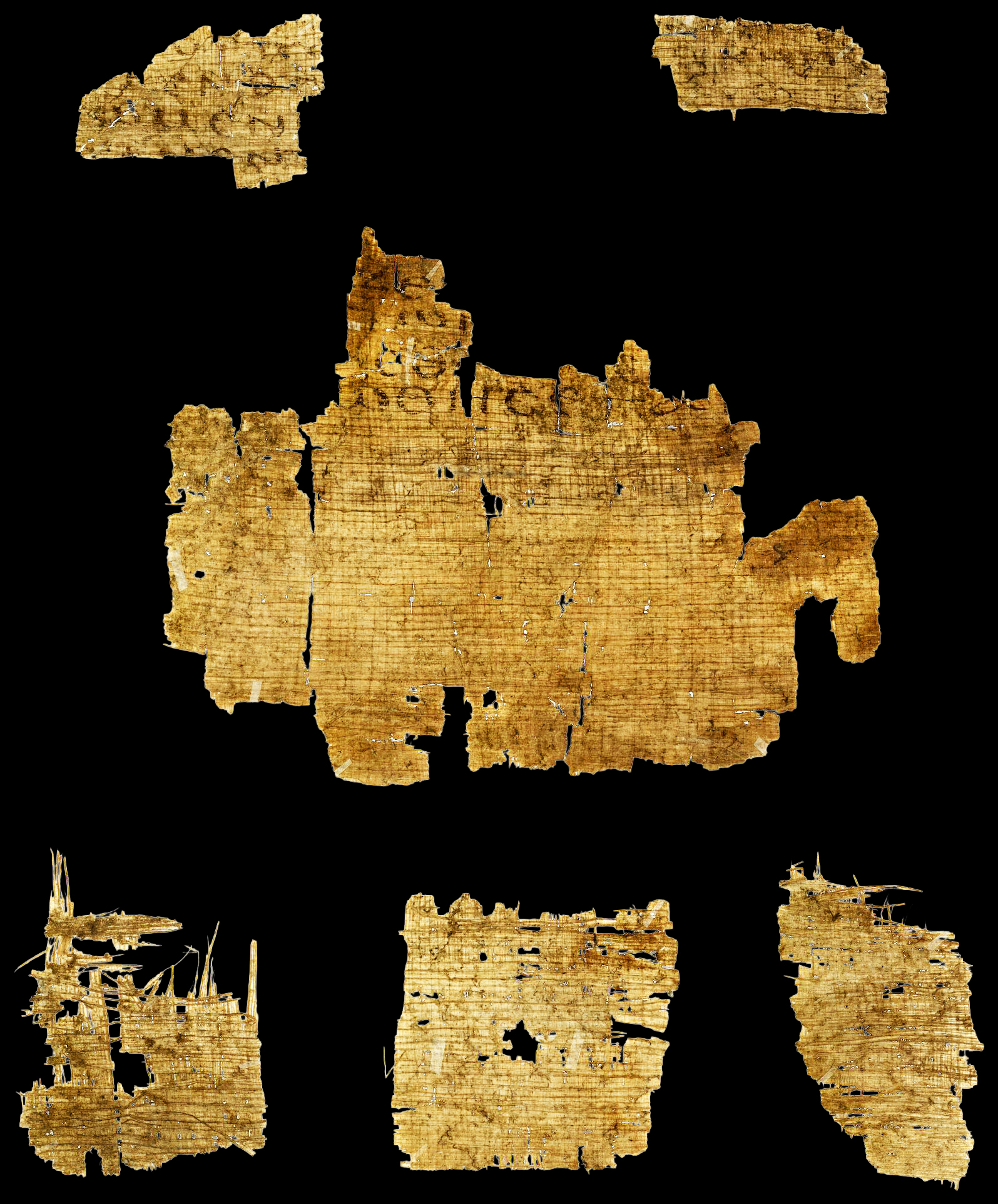
Fragments c to h containing parts of the Epistle to the Romans in Papyrus 40, written about AD 250

Some early manuscripts containing the text of this chapter are:

- Papyrus 40 (~250; extant verses 16–17, 27)
- Papyrus 27 (3rd century; extant verses 3, 5–9)
- Codex Vaticanus (325–350)
- Codex Sinaiticus (330–360)
- Codex Alexandrinus (400–440)
- Codex Ephraemi Rescriptus (~450; complete)

=== Old Testament references ===
- Romans 9:7 references Genesis 21:12
- Romans 9:9 references Genesis 18:10,14
- Romans 9:12 references Genesis 25:23
- Romans 9:13 references Malachi 1:2,3
- Romans 9:15 references Exodus 33:19
- Romans 9:17 references Exodus 9:16
- Romans 9:21 references Isaiah 45:9, Jeremiah 18:6 and Wisdom 15:7
- Romans 9:25 references Hosea 2:23
- Romans 9:26 references Hosea 1:10
- Romans 9:27 references Isaiah 10:22,23
- Romans 9:29 references Isaiah 1:9
- Romans 9:33 references Isaiah 8:14 and Isaiah 28:16

=== New Testament references ===
- Romans 9:25 references 1 Peter 2:10
- Romans 9:33 references 1 Peter 2:6

== Paul's lament over Israel (verses 1–5) ==
The remarks in verses 1–5 seem to mirror Exodus 32:30–34, when Moses offered to be "blotted out of the book" for the Israelites, who had "sinned a great sin" for worshiping the golden calf at Mount Sinai. This incident may also underline Paul's description of human idolatry and rebellion in Romans 1:18–32 and Paul explicitly contrasting his ministry with that of Moses in 2 Corinthians 3:4–11. Therefore, Paul speaks of the 'Israelites' (verse 4 and more generally in chapters 9–11) instead of the 'Jews'.

=== Verses 1-2 ===
^{1} I am speaking the truth in Christ - I am not lying; my conscience bears me witness in the Holy Spirit - ^{2} that I have great sorrow and unceasing anguish in my heart.

Craig Hill likens the transition from exultation at the end of Romans 8 - from [neither] height nor depth, nor anything else in all creation, will be able to separate us from the love of God in Christ Jesus our Lord to great sorrow and unceasing anguish at the beginning of chapter 9 - to "walking off a precipice ... [into] the shadowy depths".

=== Verse 3 ===
For I could wish that I myself were accursed from Christ for my brethren, my countrymen according to the flesh

— Romans 9:3, New King James Version

Alexander Kirkpatrick, in the Cambridge Bible for Schools and Colleges, associates Paul's willingness to be "cursed and cut off from Christ" for the sake of his brethren with Moses' prayer for the forgiveness of his wayward people ("forgive their sin – but if not, I pray, blot me out of Your book which You have written") and with King David's mourning on the death of his son Absalom, "O my son Absalom – my son, my son Absalom – if only I had died in your place! O Absalom my son, my son!".

== God's consistency evident in the election of true Israel (verses 6–29) ==
In asserting "the faithfulness of God", Paul first "clear[s] the way", by defining the true limits of God's promise. "It was not really to all Israel that the promise was given, but only to a particular section of Israel", namely those who were descended from Abraham through Isaac.

=== Verse 6 ===
But it is not that the word of God has taken no effect. For they are not all Israel who are of Israel,

— Romans 9:6, New King James Version

The divine promises to Abraham were fulfilled, even though "only a portion of Abraham's natural descendants" were elected.

=== Verse 7 ===
nor are they all children because they are the seed of Abraham; but, "In Isaac your seed shall be called."

— Romans 9:7, New King James Version

Verse 7 cites Genesis 21:12.

The failure of Ishmael and Esau to obtain their natural birthright does not hinder the fulfillment of God's promises, because it is through the second born, Isaac and Jacob, the true "children of promise", that God's plan was fulfilled.

=== Verse 10-13 ===
10. And not only this, but there was Rebekah also, when she had conceived [twins] by one man, our father Isaac;

11. for though [the twins] were not yet born and had not done anything good or bad, so that God’s purpose according to [His] choice would stand, not because of works but because of Him who calls,

12. it was said to her, “The older will serve the younger.”

13. Just as it is written, “Jacob I loved, but Esau I hated.”

— Romans 9:13, New American Standard Bible 1995

Verse 12 cites Genesis 25:23.

Verse 13 cites Malachi 1:2–3.

There is debate over the symbolic identities of Jacob and Esau in this passage. Irenaeus understands the immediate referents of the brothers to be the nations of Israel and Edom, and the extended referent of Israel to be Christ and that of Edom to be the Jews who rejected Christ. Tertullian interprets Jacob as referring to the Christian church and Esau as referring to the Jews. Clement of Alexandria rejects the idea that the referent could be ethnic groups or that the groupings are the result of anything other than free choice, and states that anyone who chooses to have faith is Israel. Augustine of Hippo interprets Jacob as referring to the Israelites who had faith in God and Esau as those who did not. He extends the interpretation to refer to all who have faith and all who do not. Roman Catholicism, Eastern Orthodoxy, and the Oriental Orthodox Churches hold to Jacob and Esau as group referents, not individuals. Medieval Latin commentators like Thomas Aquinas understand the referents to be the individuals Jacob and Esau themselves. The referent as individual position is principally associated with by Augustinianism, Lutheranism, and Reformed Christianity.

=== Verses 14-24 ===
14. What shall we say then? There is no injustice with God, is there? May it never be!

15. For He says to Moses, “I will have mercy on whom I have mercy, and I will have compassion on whom I have compassion.”

16. So then it [does] not [depend] on the man who wills or the man who runs, but on God who has mercy.

17. For the Scripture says to Pharaoh, “For this very purpose I raised you up, to demonstrate My power in you, and that My name might be proclaimed throughout the whole earth.”

18. So then He has mercy on whom He desires, and He hardens whom He desires.

19. You will say to me then, “Why does He still find fault? For who resists His will?”

20. On the contrary, who are you, O man, who answers back to God? The thing molded will not say to the molder, “Why did you make me like this,” will it?

21. Or does not the potter have a right over the clay, to make from the same lump one vessel for honorable use and another for common use?

22. What if God, although willing to demonstrate His wrath and to make His power known, endured with much patience vessels of wrath prepared for destruction?

23. And [He did so] to make known the riches of His glory upon vessels of mercy, which He prepared beforehand for glory,

24. [even] us, whom He also called, not from among Jews only, but also from among Gentiles.

— Romans 9:14-24, New American Standard Bible 1995

Verse 15 quotes the book of Exodus 33:19. The context is YHWH revealing his glory to Moses in response to Moses's request to see YHWH's face.

Verse 17 quotes Exodus 9:16. The statement is part of YHWH's address through Moses to Pharaoh after his refusal to let the Israelites out of Egypt and is followed by a condemnation of Pharaoh's non-cooperation with YHWH's purpose.

Verses 20-22 is likely a reference to the book of Jeremiah, chapter 18. Jeremiah is told by YHWH to observe a potter forming a pot which spoils on the wheel and is broken down and remade. The Kingdom of Judah is then likened to a pot, which YHWH will break down through external forces and remake should Judah's loyalty to him, likened to the pot's integrity, fail. Judah then is urged to repent to avert this, but then is characterized as unwilling to do so.

Verse 22 is interesting as εἰ δὲ ("but/and if" ) as the sentence lacks an explicit apodosis . This problem is first noted in Origen's Commentary on Romans.

Historically, Proto-orthodox writers such as Clement of Alexandria and Origen strongly reject a deterministic understanding of verses 14-24 on allegorical, logical, and doctrinal grounds. Tertullian understands v.20-23 to refer to humanity's material body that is formed "out of the dust of the ground". He interprets the vessels of honor as referring to human bodily immortality resulting from the intimate union of the body with the spirit, and vessels of dishonor as referring to a mortal body not indwelt by the spirit. Deterministic readings of this passage first appear in Augustinian Scholasticism and become normative in Lutheranism and Reformed Christianity where the passage is considered a major basis for the doctrine of unconditional election, and central to debate on double predestination.

There is substantial modern debate on how extensively Paul's let to the Romans fits the form of a diatribe. Verses 14-15 and 17-19 are often proposed as examples of objections spoken by the literary hostile interlocutor. Origen is our first source to propose this view, holding the maximalist position that all verses 14-19 are from the mouth of the fictitious contradictor and therefore not part of Paul's train of thought.

=== Verse 27 ===
Isaiah also cries out concerning Israel: "Though the number of the children of Israel be like the sand of the sea, a remnant shall be saved."

— Romans 9:27, Modern English Version

Verse 27 cites Isaiah 10:22–23.

=== Verse 28 ===
"For He will finish the work and cut it short in righteousness, Because the Lord will make a short work upon the earth."

— Romans 9:28, New King James Version

Verse 28 cites Isaiah 10:22–23.

== Israel's failure explained (verses 30–33) ==
In the passage that continues until Romans 10:21, Paul gives statements on Israel's response and responsibility regarding the proclamation of Christ. After providing a view "from above" in verses 6–29, that is, from the perspective of God's purpose and election of Israel, the subsequent verses provide a view "from below", that is, from the perspective of the Jews, "who had worked diligently to be righteous, have rejected faith in Christ, the only thing able to make them truly righteous", whereas some Gentiles effortlessly believe in Christ.

=== Verse 33 ===
As it is written:

"Behold, I lay in Zion a stumbling stone and rock of offense,

And whoever believes on Him will not be put to shame."

— Romans 9:33, New King James Version

Verse 33 cites Isaiah 8:14 and Isaiah 28:16; cross reference 1 Peter 2:6,8.

== See also ==
- Abraham
- Esau
- Hosea
- Isaac
- Israel
- Isaiah
- Jacob
- Moses
- Pharaoh
- Rebecca
- Sarah
- Zion
- Related Bible parts: Genesis 18, Genesis 21, Genesis 25, Exodus 9, Exodus 33, Isaiah 1, Isaiah 8, Isaiah 10, Isaiah 28, Hosea 1, Hosea 2, Malachi 1

== Bibliography ==
- Coogan, Michael David (2007). Coogan, Michael David; Brettler, Marc Zvi; Newsom, Carol Ann; Perkins, Pheme (eds.). The New Oxford Annotated Bible with the Apocryphal/Deuterocanonical Books: New Revised Standard Version, Issue 48 (Augmented 3rd ed.). Oxford University Press. ISBN 9780195288810.
- Hill, Craig C. (2007). "64. Romans". In Barton, John; Muddiman, John (eds.). The Oxford Bible Commentary (first (paperback) ed.). Oxford University Press. pp. 1083–1108. ISBN 978-0199277186.
