= Isaiah 8 =

Book of Isaiah, chapter 8

- ← chapter 7 chapter 9 →
- The Great Isaiah Scroll, the best preserved of the biblical scrolls found at Qumran from the second century BC, contains all the verses in this chapter.
- Book: Book of Isaiah
- Hebrew Bible part: Nevi'im
- Order in the Hebrew part: 5
- Category: Latter Prophets
- Christian Bible part: Old Testament
- Order in the Christian part: 23

Isaiah 8 is the eighth chapter of the Book of Isaiah in the Hebrew Bible, which is broadly the base of the Old Testament of the Christian Bible. This book contains the prophecies attributed to the prophet Isaiah and is one of the Books of the Prophets.

== Text ==
The original text was written in Hebrew language. This chapter is divided into 22 verses in many translations, but in Hebrew texts and some English versions Isaiah 9:1 appears as verse 8:23.

=== Textual witnesses ===
Some early manuscripts containing the text of this chapter in Hebrew are of the Masoretic Text tradition, which includes the Codex Cairensis (895), the Petersburg Codex of the Prophets (916), Aleppo Codex (10th century), Codex Leningradensis (1008).

Fragments containing parts of this chapter were found among the Dead Sea Scrolls (3rd century BC or later):

- 1QIsa^{a}: complete
- 1QIsa^{b}: extant: verses 1, 8-12
- 4QIsa^{e} (4Q59): extant: verses 2‑14
- 4QIsa^{f} (4Q60): extant: verses 1, 4‑11
- 4QIsa^{h} (4Q62): extant: verses 11‑14

There is also a translation into Koine Greek known as the Septuagint, made in the last few centuries BCE. Extant ancient manuscripts of the Septuagint version include Codex Vaticanus (B; $\mathfrak{G}$^{B}; 4th century), Codex Sinaiticus (S; BHK: $\mathfrak{G}$^{S}; 4th century), Codex Alexandrinus (A; $\mathfrak{G}$^{A}; 5th century) and Codex Marchalianus (Q; $\mathfrak{G}$^{Q}; 6th century).

== Parashot ==
The parashah sections listed here are based on the Aleppo Codex. Isaiah 8 is a part of the Prophecies about Judah and Israel (Isaiah 1-12). {P}: open parashah; {S}: closed parashah.

{P} 8:1-3a {S} 8:3b-4 ויאמר ה' אלי {S} 8:5-8 {S} 8:9-10 {S} 8:11-15 {P} 8:16-18 {S} 8:19-23 [9:1-6 {P}]

== The sign of Maher-shalal-hash-baz (8:1–4) ==
Since the sign of Immanuel (Isaiah 7:14-17) gives an undisclosed time in the future, another sign is given to deal with the contemporary scene, in the form of a child with an ordinary birth and a name which would be a standing witness (cf. Isaiah 8:18) to the prophecy both about 'the enemy at the gate' (verse 4; cf. Isaiah 7:16) and about the next victim of the Assyrians, which is Judah itself (Isaiah 7:17).

=== Verse 1 ===
Moreover the Lord said to me, "Take a large scroll, and write on it with a man’s pen concerning Maher-Shalal-Hash-Baz".

- "Maher-Shalal-Hash-Baz": Literally, "Speed the Spoil, Hasten the Booty"

=== Verse 3 ===
Then I went to the prophetess, and she conceived and bore a son. Then the Lord said to me, "Call his name Maher-Shalal-Hash-Baz";

The striking similarity with Isaiah 7:14-15 raises an argument that this is a variant version of the same story, but 'the heavily symbolic name given to the unsuspecting child has markedly different overtone'.

== God's gentle flow and Assyria's torrent (8:5–8) ==
Using evil to fight evil would bring Judah to the path of the torrent/flood which would jeopardize herself as the land of Immanuel, but for Immanuel's sake, there is a limit set (verse 8: up to the neck; cf. Isaiah 10:24–27).

== God our refuge or our ruin (8:9–15) ==
This part contains Isaiah's defiant response to the meaning of "Immanuel" (verse 10c: God with us) and to God's insistence (verse 11: his strong hand upon me) that people should reshape their thinking and emotional attitudes (verse 12) round God himself (cf. call to a transformed outlook in Romans 12:2).

=== Verse 12 ===
"Do not say, 'A conspiracy,'
Concerning all that this people call a conspiracy,
Nor be afraid of their threats, nor be troubled."

- "Their threats" (NKJV; ESV: "What they fear"): or "terror".

Verses 12b–13a are cited in 1 Peter 3:14–15 which identifies Christ with the "Lord of hosts" (Lord Almighty) as Jesus himself alluded Isaiah 8:14–15 in Luke 20:18a (cf. Romans 9:33, 1 Peter 2:7–8).

=== Verse 13 ===
Sanctify the Lord of hosts himself; and let him be your fear, and let him be your dread.

- The first part is cited in 1 Peter 3:15

As the oracle of judgement in this part gives clear warning to all conspiring against the community that the presence of Immanuel ('God is with us') will overthrow their plans: There is no political solutions to the community's problems, but the people are to trust in YHWH (Let him be your fear, and let him be your dread).

=== Verse 14 ===
He is the sanctuary and the stumbling stone
and the rock that brings down the two houses of Israel;
a trap and a snare for the inhabitants of Jerusalem.

- Cross reference: Isaiah 28:16
- Cited in Romans 9:33; 1 Peter 2:7–8.
- Alluded to in Luke 20:18a.

=== Verse 15 ===
"And many among them shall stumble;
They shall fall and be broken,
Be snared and taken."

- Alluded to in Luke 20:18a; 1 Peter 2:8.
- "Taken": or "captured".

== The light withdrawn (8:16–22) ==
This part indicates that Israel is losing God's teaching and blessing (verses 16–17), because Israel is refusing the light (verses 19–22), so is only left with signs (verse 18) and can only expect darkness (verse 22).

=== Verse 16 ===
Bind up the testimony
Seal the law among my disciples.

This verse relates to the completion of the scroll initiated in verse 1. The expression my disciples is God's new definition for his people in their relation to him.

== Verse 23 ==
For is there no gloom to her that was steadfast?

The Jerusalem Bible suggests that this line "seems to be a gloss".

In the former time he debased the land of Zebulon, and the land of Naphthali;
But in the latter time he hath made it glorious:
Even the way of the sea, beyond Jordan, Galilee of the nations.

This text, which appears as Isaiah 9:1 in most modern Christian translations, forms verse 8:23 in Hebrew texts and some English versions.

== See also ==
- Assyria
- Euphrates
- Immanuel
- Jewish messianism
- Messianic prophecies of Jesus
- Pekah, king of Israel
- Rezin, king of Aram
- Siloam
  - Related Bible parts: Isaiah 7, Isaiah 9, Isaiah 28, Matthew 1, John 9, Romans 9

== Sources ==
- Coggins, R. (2007). "22. Isaiah". In Barton, John; Muddiman, John (eds.). The Oxford Bible Commentary (first (paperback) ed.). Oxford University Press. pp. 433–486. ISBN 978-0199277186.
- Motyer, J. Alec (2015). The Prophecy of Isaiah: An Introduction & Commentary. InterVarsity Press. ISBN 9780830895243.
- Kidner, Derek (1994). "Isaiah". In Carson, D. A.; France, R. T.; Motyer, J. A.; Wenham, G. J. (eds.). New Bible Commentary: 21st Century Edition (4, illustrated, reprint, revised ed.). Inter-Varsity Press. pp. 629–670. ISBN 9780851106489.
- Würthwein, Ernst (1995). The Text of the Old Testament. Translated by Rhodes, Erroll F. Grand Rapids, MI: Wm. B. Eerdmans. ISBN 0-8028-0788-7.
