= Manea (name) =

Manea is a Romanian surname, derived from the old personal name Manu, cognate of Emmanuel. Notable persons with the name Manea include:

== Persons with the given name ==
- Manea Khadoum (born 1994), Emirati footballer
- Manea Mănescu (1916–2009), Romanian politician
- Manea Mohammed (born 1989), Emirati footballer

== Persons with the surname ==
- Alin Manea (born 1997), Romanian footballer
- Cristian Manea (born 1997), Romanian football player
- Elham Manea (born 1966), Privatdozentin
- Ern Manea (1926–2013), Australian mayor
- Mohammed Al Manea (born 1930), Kuwaiti actor
- Nicolae Manea (1954–2014), Romanian football player and coach
- Norman Manea (born 1936), Romanian writer
- Oana Manea (born 1985), Romanian handball player
- Silviu Manea (born 1983), Romanian athlete
