= Isaiah 5 =

Book of Isaiah, chapter 5

- ← chapter 4 chapter 6 →
- The Great Isaiah Scroll, the best preserved of the biblical scrolls found at Qumran from the second century BC, contains all the verses in this chapter.
- Book: Book of Isaiah
- Hebrew Bible part: Nevi'im
- Order in the Hebrew part: 5
- Category: Latter Prophets
- Christian Bible part: Old Testament
- Order in the Christian part: 23

Isaiah 5 is the fifth chapter of the Book of Isaiah in the Hebrew Bible or the Old Testament of the Christian Bible. This book contains the prophecies attributed to the prophet Isaiah, and is one of the Books of the Prophets. Chapter 5 includes the "song" or parable of the vineyard and an account of six "woes" or sins which have been committed by Israel.

== Text ==
The original text was written in Hebrew language. This chapter is divided into 30 verses.

=== Textual witnesses ===
Some early manuscripts containing the text of this chapter in Hebrew are of the Masoretic Text tradition, which includes the Codex Cairensis (895), the Petersburg Codex of the Prophets (916), Aleppo Codex (10th century), Codex Leningradensis (1008).

Fragments containing parts of this chapter were found among the Dead Sea Scrolls (3rd century BC or later):

- 1QIsa^{a}: complete
- 4QIsa^{b} (4Q56): extant: verses 15–28
- 4QIsa^{f} (4Q60): extant: verses 13–14, 25
- 4QIsa^{p} (4Q69): extant: verses 28-30

There is also a translation into Koine Greek known as the Septuagint, made in the last few centuries BCE. Extant ancient manuscripts of the Septuagint version include Codex Vaticanus (B; $\mathfrak{G}$^{B}; 4th century), Codex Sinaiticus (S; BHK: $\mathfrak{G}$^{S}; 4th century), Codex Alexandrinus (A; $\mathfrak{G}$^{A}; 5th century) and Codex Marchalianus (Q; $\mathfrak{G}$^{Q}; 6th century).

== Parashot ==
The parashah sections listed here are based on the Aleppo Codex. Isaiah 5 is a part of the Prophecies about Judah and Israel (Isaiah 1-12). {P}: open parashah; {S}: closed parashah.

{P} 5:1-6 {P} 5:8-10 {S} 5:11-17 {S} 5:18-19 {S} 5:20 {S} 5:21 {S} 5:22-23 {P} 5:24-30 {P}

== Parable of the vineyard (verses 1–7) ==
These verses are "highly regarded for [their] literary sophistication".

Now let me sing to my Well-beloved

A song of my Beloved regarding His vineyard:

It is not clear whether the song is the beloved's own song; the New Revised Standard Version presents the song as "my love song". In relation to the "Parable of the Vineyard", the New Oxford Annotated Bible identifies the vineyard in Isaiah 5:7 as "Israel" (compare to Isaiah 1:8; Isaiah 3:14; Isaiah 27:2–6).

My Well-beloved has a vineyard

On a very fruitful hill.

He dug it up and cleared out its stones,

And planted it with the choicest vine.

The "choicest vine" is a poetic allusion to the people of Israel (cf. Psalm 80:8–16; Jeremiah 2:21; Hosea 10:1).

He built a tower in its midst,

And also made a winepress in it;

So He expected it to bring forth good grapes,

But it brought forth wild grapes.

The failing grapes are described as "wild" in the King James Version and the English Standard Version, "rotten" in the New American Bible (Revised Edition) and "sour" in the Good News Translation. In Brenton's Septuagint Translation, the vineyard "brought forth thorns".

== The six woes (verses 8–23) ==
Verses 8 to 24 contain "the six woes". Anglican theologian Edward Plumptre suggests that the form of the woes preached by Jesus in Luke 6:24–26 is based on this passage. After the general warning conveyed to Israel by the parable of the vineyard, "six sins are particularised as those which have especially provoked God to give the warning".

The six woes of Isaiah relate to those responsible for:

- Amalgamation of land (verses 8–10)
- Drunkenness and revelry (verses 11–17)
- Compound sinfulness, or "sin with a cart rope" (verses 18–19)
- Use of language to justify evil (verse 20)
- Self-conceit (verse 21)
- Corruption (verses 22–23) associated with intoxication, cf. Proverbs 31:3:

It is not for kings to drink wine, not for rulers to crave beer.

=== Verse 8 ===
Woe to those who join house to house;
They add field to field,
Till there is no place
Where they may dwell alone in the midst of the land!

The law of Israel provided "very stringently and carefully, that as far as possible there should be an equal distribution of the soil, and that hereditary family property should be inalienable. All landed property that had been alienated reverted to the family every fiftieth year, or year of jubilee; so that alienation simply had reference to the usufruct of the land till that time."

Micah 2:2 and the Jerusalem Bible's translation of Job 22:8 make similar points:

You have narrowed the lands of the poor down to nothing.

=== Verse 20 ===
Woe to those who call evil good, and good evil

"This fourth woe relates to those who adopted a code of morals that completely overturned the first principles of ethics, and was utterly opposed to the law of God."

=== Verse 21 ===
Woe unto them that are wise in their own eyes, and prudent in their own sight!

See also Proverbs 3:7:

Do not be wise in your own eyes

== Foreign nations will attack (verses 24–30) ==
=== Verse 25 ===
For all this His anger is not turned away,
But His hand is stretched out still.

This is the first occurrence of a refrain which appears again in Isaiah 9:12, 9:17, 9:21 and 10:4.

== See also ==
- Parable of the Wicked Husbandmen
- Related Bible parts: Exodus 32, Psalm 80, Song of Songs, Jeremiah 2, Hosea 10, Matthew 21, Luke 13, Romans 1, Romans 12

== Sources ==
- Coggins, R (2007). "22. Isaiah". In Barton, John; Muddiman, John (eds.). The Oxford Bible Commentary (first (paperback) ed.). Oxford University Press. pp. 433–586. ISBN 978-0199277186.
- Motyer, J. Alec (2015). The Prophecy of Isaiah: An Introduction & Commentary. InterVarsity Press. ISBN 9780830895243.
- Ulrich, Eugene, ed. (2010). The Biblical Qumran Scrolls: Transcriptions and Textual Variants. Brill.
- Würthwein, Ernst (1995). The Text of the Old Testament. Translated by Rhodes, Erroll F. Grand Rapids, MI: Wm. B. Eerdmans. ISBN 0-8028-0788-7.
