= Almah =

Hebrew word for a sexually mature woman

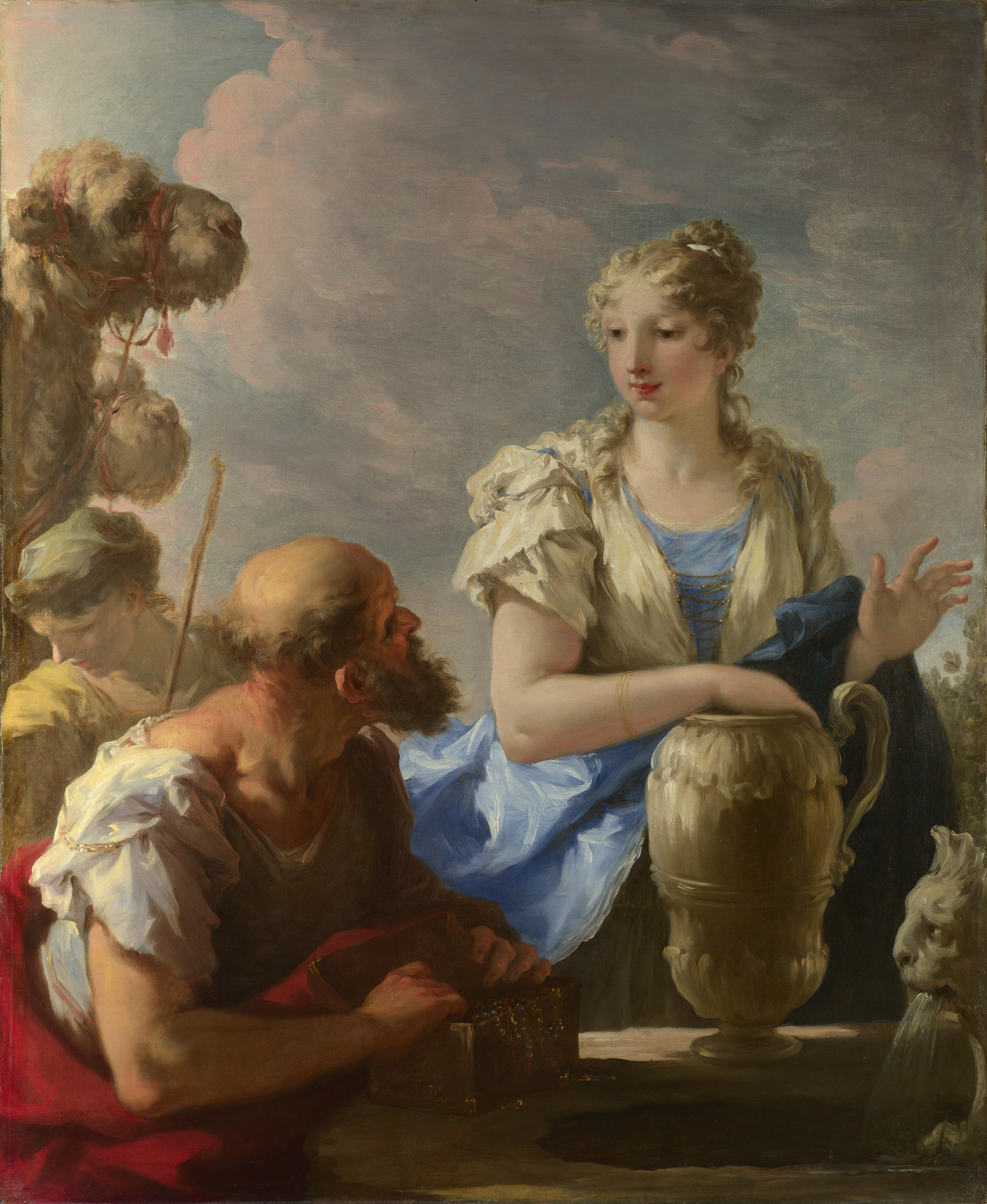
Rebecca at the well, by Giovanni Antonio Pellegrini. Rebecca is described as an almah (Genesis 24:43)

In Biblical Hebrew, the words almah (sing; עַלְמָה ‘almā) and alamot (plur; עֲלָמוֹת ‘ălāmōṯ), drawn from a Semitic root implying the vigour of puberty, refer to a young woman who is sexually ripe for marriage. Although the concept is central to the account of the virgin birth of Jesus in the Gospel of Matthew, the scholarly consensus is that the words denote a woman's fertility without concern for her virginity. They occur nine times in the Hebrew Bible. In the ancient Near East, many spiritual and cultural traditions centred on women were tied to their ability to bear children, and this particular focus on motherhood remains present in the Abrahamic religions today.

== Etymology and social context ==
Almah derives from a root meaning "to be full of vigour, to have reached puberty". In the ancient Near East, girls received value as potential wives and bearers of children: "A wife, who came into her husband's household as an outsider, contributed her labor and her fertility ... [h]er task was to build up the bet 'ab bearing children, particularly sons" (Leeb, 2002). Scholars thus agree that almah refers to a woman of childbearing age without implying virginity, while an unrelated word, betulah (בְּתוּלָה), best refers to a virgin, as well as the idea of virginity, betulim (בְּתוּלִים).

From the same root the corresponding masculine word elem עֶלֶם 'young man' also appears in the Bible, as does alum (used in plural עֲלוּמִים) used in the sense '(vigor of) adolescence', in addition to the post-Biblical words almut (עַלְמוּת) and alimut (עֲלִימוּת) both used for youthfulness and its strength (distinct from post-Biblical Alimut אַלִּימוּת 'violence' with initial Aleph, although Klein's Dictionary states this latter root is likely a semantic derivation of the former, from 'strength of youth' to 'violence').

== In Hebrew texts ==
The word ‘almah occurs nine times in its various forms in the Hebrew Bible, while the masculine form ‘elem only twice. It is therefore quite rare, if compared to na‘ar (youth), which occurs over 225 times, or betulah (virgin), which occurs 51 times.

There are three occurrences of the form ha‘almah. It is used twice for young women who are known to be virgin, while the third occurrence is in Isaiah 7:14.

- In Genesis 24 a servant of Abraham, seeking a wife for his son, Isaac, retells how he met Rebecca. He says that he prayed to the Lord that if an almah came to the well and he requested a drink of water from her, that should she then provide him with that drink and also water his camels; he would take that as a sign that she was to be the wife of Isaac. The word almah is only used during the retelling; another word, hanaara, is used during the events themselves.
- In Exodus 2, Miriam, an almah, the sister of the infant Moses, is entrusted to watch the baby; she takes thoughtful action to reunite the baby with his mother by offering to bring the baby to a Hebrew nurse maid (her mother).
- The verses surrounding Isaiah 7:14 tell how Ahaz, the king of Judah, is told of a sign to be given in demonstration that the prophet's promise of God's protection from his enemies is a true one. The sign is that an almah is pregnant and will give birth to a son who will still be very young when these enemies will be destroyed.

There are four occurrences of the form ‘alamoth, some of which are rather obscure in their meaning.

- In 1 Chronicles 15:20 and the heading to Psalm 46, the psalm is to be played "on alamot". The musical meaning of this phrase has become lost with time: it may mean a feminine manner of singing or playing, such as a girls' choir, or an instrument made in the city of "Alameth". Old translators were puzzled about the exact meaning of these expressions and interpreted them variously, e.g. Symmachus read ‘olamoth (regarding eternal things) in Ps. 46, the Vulgate read ‘alumoth (arcane) in 1 Chron. 15:20 etc.
- In a victory parade in Psalm 68:25, the participants are listed in order of appearance: 1) the singers; 2) the musicians; and 3) the "alamot" playing cymbals or tambourines.
- The Song of Songs 1:3 contains a poetic chant of praise to a man, declaring that all the alamot adore him.

There is one occurrence of the form wa‘alamoth.

- In the Song of Songs chapter 6, verse 8, the glory of the female object of his love is favorably compared to 60 queens (wives of the king), 80 concubines, as well as innumerable alamot, and in the next verse she is stated to be undefiled.

There is one occurrence of the form ba‘alamoth. This is also the only case where the referred woman in the Hebrew Bible is also possibly not a virgin. Other versions of the Bible read ba‘alummah (in youth).

- In Proverbs 30:19, concerning an adulterous wife, the Hebrew text differs significantly from the Greek Septuagint, the Latin Vulgate and the Syriac Peshitta. All versions begin by comparing the woman's acts to things that leave no traces: a bird flying in air, the movement of a snake over a rock, the path of a ship through the sea; but while the Hebrew version concludes with the "ways of a man with an almah", the other versions read "and the ways of a man in his youth".

== In Greek texts ==
The Septuagint translates four occurrences of almah into a generic word neanis (νεᾶνις) meaning 'young woman' while, two occurrences, one in Genesis 24:43 and one in Isaiah 7:14, are translated as parthenos (παρθένος), the basic word associated with virginity in Greek (it is a title of Athena 'The Virgin Goddess') but still occasionally used by the Greeks for an unmarried woman who is not a virgin. Most scholars agree that Isaiah's phrase (a young woman shall conceive and bear a son) did not intend to convey any miraculous conception, although virgin can be an appropriate translation depending on context. In this verse, as in the Genesis occurrence concerning Rebecca, the Septuagint translators used the Greek word parthenos generically to indicate an unmarried young woman, whose probable virginity (as unmarried young women were ideally seen at the time) was incidental.

== Bibliography ==
- Byrne, Ryan (2009). "Anatomy of a Cargo Cult". In Byrne, Ryan; McNary-Zak, Bernadette (eds.). Resurrecting the Brother of Jesus: The James Ossuary Controversy and the Quest for Religious Relics. University of North Carolina Press. ISBN 9780807895498.
- Childs, Brevard S (2001). Isaiah. Westminster John Knox Press. ISBN 9780664221430.
- Fletcher Steele, Wilbur (January 1892). "Art. I. -- The Virgin Birth -- Its Expectation and Publication". Methodist Review. Fifth. VIII. G. Lane & P. B. Sandford: 24.
- Gravett, Sandra L.; Bohmbach, Karla G.; Greifenhagen, F.V.; Polaski, Donald C. (2008). An Introduction to the Hebrew Bible: A Thematic Approach. Westminster John Knox Press. ISBN 9780664230302.
- Grindheim, Sigurd (14 March 2013). Introducing Biblical Theology. Bloomsbury Publishing. p. 78. ISBN 978-0-567-32105-3.
- Leeb, C.S. (2002). "The widow: homeless and post-menopausal". Biblical Theology Bulletin. 32 (4): 160–162. doi:10.1177/014610790203200403. S2CID 169057204 – via HighBeam Research.
- MacLachlan, Bonnie (2007). MacLachlan, Bonnie; Fletcher, Judith (eds.). Virginity Revisited: Configurations of the Unpossessed Body. University of Toronto Press. p. 7. ISBN 978-0-8020-9013-3.
- Moyise, Steve (2013). Was the Birth of Jesus According to Scripture?. Wipf and Stock. p. PT95. ISBN 978-1-62189-673-9.
- Preuss, Horst Dietrich (1974). "Isaiah". In Botterweck, Gerhard Johannes; Ringgren, Helmer (eds.). Theological Dictionary of the Old Testament. Vol. I. Eerdmans. ISBN 9780802823250.
- Seidman, Naomi (2010). Faithful Renderings: Jewish-Christian Difference and the Politics of Translation. University of Chicago Press. ISBN 978-0-226-74507-7.
- Sweeney, Marvin A. (1996). Isaiah 1-39: With an Introduction to Prophetic Literature. William B. Eerdmans Pub. Co. ISBN 9780802841001.
- Seidman, Naomi (2006). Faithful Renderings: Jewish-Christian Difference and the Politics of Translation. University of Chicago Press. ISBN 978-0226745053.
- Williamson, H.G.M. (2018). Isaiah 6-12: A Critical and Exegetical Commentary. International Critical Commentary. Bloomsbury Publishing. p. 152. ISBN 978-0-567-67928-4.
- Steinmueller, John E. (1940). "Etymology and Biblical Usage of 'Almah". The Catholic Biblical Quarterly. 2 (1): 28–43. JSTOR 43715861.
