= Syro-Ephraimite War =

War in 8th century BC

Date	736–732 BCE
Location	Levant
Result	Judahite-Assyrian victory
Territorial changes	Aram-Damascus and much of Levant annexed by Assyrian Empire; Judah and Israel become tributary states.

Belligerents
Neo-Assyrian Empire; Kingdom of Judah	Kingdom of Aram-Damascus; Kingdom of Israel

Commanders and leaders
Tiglath-Pileser III; Ahaz	Rezin †; Pekah (executed); Son of Tabeel

The Syro-Ephraimite War was a conflict which took place in the 8th century BCE between the Kingdom of Judah and an alliance of Aram-Damascus and the Kingdom of Israel based in Samaria. One theory states that the war's sole goal was to force Judah to join the anti-Assyrian coalition. In 735 BCE, kings Rezin of Aram-Damascus and Pekah of Israel, attempted to depose king Ahaz of Judah through an invasion. Judah was defeated and, according to 2 Chronicles 28, lost 120,000 troops in just one day. Many significant officials were killed, including the king's son Maaseiah. Many others were taken away as slaves. Telling of the same war, 2 Kings 16:5 states that Rezin and Pekah besieged Jerusalem but failed to capture it. During the invasion the Philistines and Edomites took advantage of the situation, raiding towns and villages in Judah. In turn, Ahaz asked Tiglath-Pileser III of Assyria for help.

The Assyrians intervened on behalf of Judah, conquering Israel, Aram-Damascus and the Philistines. However, the post-war alliance only brought more trouble for the king of Judah. Ahaz had to pay tribute to Tiglath-Pileser III with treasures from the Temple in Jerusalem and the royal treasury. He also built idols of Assyrian gods in Judah to find favor with his new ally.

== Immanuel prophecy ==
Isaiah tells King Ahaz that the invasion will be unsuccessful and tells him to ask God for a sign. Ahaz refuses, claiming he does not want to test God. Isaiah then announces that God himself will choose the sign:

A virgin shall conceive and bear a son, and shall call his name Immanuel. He shall eat curds and honey when he knows how to refuse the evil and choose the good. For before the child knows how to refuse the evil and choose the good, the land before whose two kings you are in dread will be deserted.

— Isaiah 7:14–16

Isaiah 8 details another prophecy about a child by the name of Maher-shalal-hash-baz (Hebrew: מַהֵר שָׁלָל חָשׁ בַּז "Hurry to the spoils!" or "He has made haste to the plunder!"). Isaiah then explains that the significance of this name is that before this child can speak, Assyria will plunder both Syria and Ephraim. Isaiah concludes these prophecies concerning his children, Shear-Jashub (meaning "the remnant shall return"), Immanuel (meaning "God with us"), and Maher-shalal-hash-baz, by saying,

Here am I, and the children the LORD has given me. We are signs and symbols in Israel from the LORD Almighty, who dwells on Mount Zion.

— Isaiah 8:18

The context continues into chapter 9 which also uses a birth of a child as its object.

== See also ==
- Military history of the Neo-Assyrian Empire
- List of Israelite civil conflicts
