= Isaiah 7 =

Book of Isaiah, chapter 7

- ← chapter 6 chapter 8 →
- The Great Isaiah Scroll, the best preserved of the biblical scrolls found at Qumran from the second century BC, contains all the verses in this chapter.
- Book: Book of Isaiah
- Hebrew Bible part: Nevi'im
- Order in the Hebrew part: 5
- Category: Latter Prophets
- Christian Bible part: Old Testament
- Order in the Christian part: 23

Isaiah 7 is the seventh chapter of the Book of Isaiah in the Hebrew Bible or the Old Testament of the Christian Bible. This book contains the prophecies attributed to the prophet Isaiah and is one of the Books of the Prophets.

== Text ==
The original text was written in Hebrew language. This chapter is divided into 25 verses.

== Summary ==
Isaiah 7 is a pivotal chapter in the Book of Isaiah, containing the famous prophecy of the Immanuel sign and dealing with the historical crisis faced by King Ahaz of Judah.

=== Historical context ===
Isaiah 7 takes place during the Syro-Ephraimite War (c. 735–732 BCE), when the northern kingdom of Israel (Ephraim) and Aram (Syria) attempted to force the southern kingdom of Judah to join their alliance against the Assyrian Empire. King Ahaz of Judah feared an invasion from these two neighboring kingdoms.

The prophet Isaiah confronted Ahaz and urged him to trust in God rather than seeking military assistance from Assyria. Isaiah assured Ahaz that the coalition against Judah would fail. When Isaiah invited Ahaz to request a sign from God, Ahaz refused, likely because he had already decided to seek Assyrian help.

=== The Immanuel prophecy (Isaiah 7:14) ===
One of the most well-known verses in Isaiah 7 is the prophecy of Immanuel:

"Therefore the Lord himself will give you a sign: Behold, the virgin shall conceive and bear a son, and shall call his name Immanuel." (Isaiah 7:14, ESV)

This prophecy is interpreted in two primary ways:

- Historical context – In its immediate context, the "Immanuel" child was a sign that before the child grew up, the two enemy kings (Rezin of Aram and Pekah of Israel) would be destroyed. This was fulfilled within a few years when Assyria defeated both kingdoms.
- Messianic interpretation – The Gospel of Matthew (Matthew 1:23) cites Isaiah 7:14 as a prophecy of the virgin birth of Jesus Christ. In Christian theology, Jesus is considered the ultimate fulfillment of the Immanuel prophecy, meaning "God with us".

=== Significance ===
Isaiah 7 is considered significant for several reasons:

- Theological importance – The chapter emphasizes the importance of trusting in God rather than political alliances. Ahaz’s reliance on Assyria instead of God led to long-term consequences for Judah.
- Messianic expectation – The Immanuel prophecy is one of the key Old Testament passages interpreted by Christians as a foreshadowing of Jesus.
- Historical impact – Ahaz’s decision to ally with Assyria made Judah a vassal state, contributing to later conflicts, including the Babylonian exile.

Isaiah 7 is thus both a historical warning and a prophetic promise, playing a central role in both Jewish and Christian traditions.

=== Textual witnesses ===
Some early manuscripts containing the text of this chapter in Hebrew are of the Masoretic Text tradition, which includes the Codex Cairensis (895), the Petersburg Codex of the Prophets (916), Aleppo Codex (10th century), Codex Leningradensis (1008).

Fragments containing parts of this chapter were found among the Dead Sea Scrolls (3rd century BC or later):

- 1QIsa^{a}: complete
- 1QIsa^{b}: extant: verses 14‑16, 20‑25
- 4QIsa^{f} (4Q60): extant: verses 16‑18, 23‑25
- 4QIsa^{h} (4Q62): extant: verses 14‑15
- 4QIsa^{l} (4Q65): extant: verses 17‑20

There is also a translation into Koine Greek known as the Septuagint, made in the last few centuries BCE. Extant ancient manuscripts of the Septuagint version include Codex Vaticanus (B; $\mathfrak{G}$^{B}; 4th century), Codex Sinaiticus (S; BHK: $\mathfrak{G}$^{S}; 4th century), Codex Alexandrinus (A; $\mathfrak{G}$^{A}; 5th century) and Codex Marchalianus (Q; $\mathfrak{G}$^{Q}; 6th century).

== Parashot ==
The parashah sections listed here are based on the Aleppo Codex. Isaiah 7 is a part of the Prophecies about Judah and Israel (Isaiah 1-12). {P}: open parashah; {S}: closed parashah.

{P} 7:1-2 {S} 7:3-6 {P} 7:7-9 {P} 7:10-17 {P} 7:18-20 {P} 7:21-22 {S} 7:23-25 {P}

== Verse 1 ==
Now it came to pass in the days of Ahaz the son of Jotham, the son of Uzziah, king of Judah, that Rezin, king of Syria and Pekah the son of Remaliah, king of Israel, went up to Jerusalem to make war against it, but could not prevail against it.

Cross reference: 2 Kings 16:5; Matthew 1:9

The purpose of the war was to bring Judah into an anti-Assyrian coalition.

== Verse 3 ==
'Then the Lord said to Isaiah,

“Go out now to meet Ahaz, you and Shear-Jashub your son,
at the end of the aqueduct from the upper pool, on the highway to the Fuller’s Field,

- "Shear-Jashub": literally means "A remnant will return" (Isaiah 6:13; compare Isaiah 7:14; Isaiah 8:3) serves "as a good omen for Ahaz."

According to the New Oxford Annotated Bible, the "upper pool" is the "reservoir south of Gihon Spring" (Isaiah 36:2). This was unlikely to be a regular meeting point: the Good News Translation calls the area "the road where the cloth makers work"; Ahaz may have gone there to undertake an engineering inspection, to ensure either that the water supplies for Jerusalem were secure, or that they would not be accessible to invading forces.

Isaiah speaks God's word to Ahaz; apparently this is "received in silence, at any rate without acknowledgment".

The place of meeting would witness another confrontation between Rabshakeh, the messenger of Sennacherib, king of Assyria, with the officials of Hezekiah, son of Ahaz (Isaiah 36:2), presenting a contrast of behavior between Ahaz and Hezekiah.

== Verse 12 ==
Ahaz said, “I will not ask [for a sign], nor will I test the Lord!”

Ahaz, unwilling to commit to the faith in God which Isaiah has demanded, uses the edict of Deuteronomy 6:16, Do not put the Lord your God to the test (New International Version) as an excuse, "under a pretence of reverence".

== Verse 14 ==
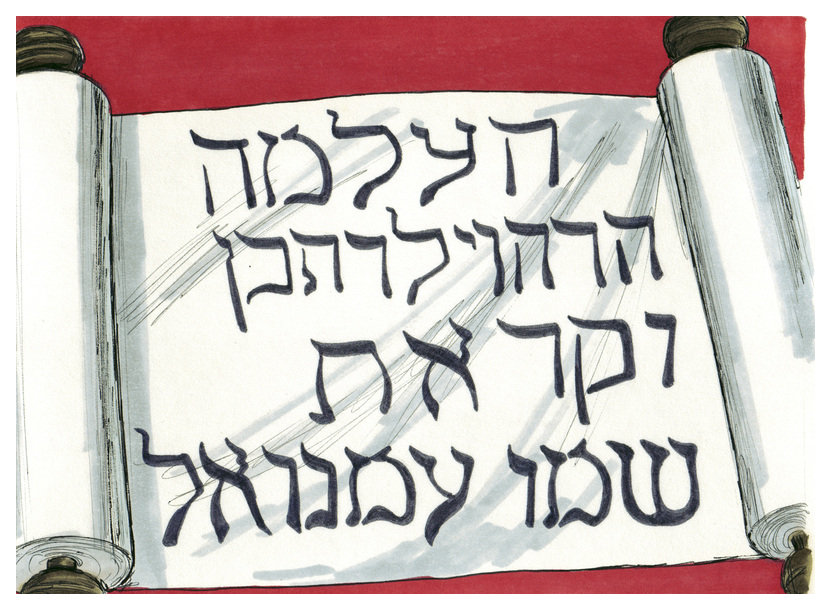
The last part of Isaiah 7:14 in Hebrew.

Therefore the Lord himself shall give you a sign; Behold, a virgin shall conceive, and bear a son, and shall call his name Immanuel.

The Hebrew Masoretic Text (10th century) and the Isaiah Scroll (2nd century BC):

לָכֵן יִתֵּן אֲדֹנָי הוּא לָכֶם אוֹת הִנֵּה הָעַלְמָה הָרָה וְיֹלֶדֶת בֵּן וְקָרָאת שְׁמוֹ עִמָּנוּאֵל

Transliteration

"lā·ḵên yitên ’ă·ḏō·nāy hū lā·ḵem o·wt: hinneh hā·‘al·māh hā·rāh wə·yō·le·ḏeṯ bên, wə·qā·rāṯ shem-o imanuel"

This verse is cited in Matthew 1:23.

== Verse 15 ==
Butter and honey shall he eat, that he may know to refuse the evil, and choose the good.

- "Butter" (Hebrew: חמאה, chem'âh): could be rendered as "thick and curdled milk".

== Verse 18 ==
And it shall come to pass in that day, that the Lord shall hiss for the fly that is in the uttermost part of the rivers of Egypt, and for the bee that is in the land of Assyria.

The Pulpit Commentary suggests that "the choice of the terms 'bee' and 'fly' to represent respectively the hosts of Assyria and Egypt, is not without significance. Egyptian armies were swarms, hastily levied, and very imperfectly disciplined. Assyrian were bodies of trained troops accustomed to war, and almost as well disciplined as the Romans."

== Uses ==
=== Music ===
The King James Version of verse 14 from this chapter is cited as texts in the English-language oratorio "Messiah" by George Frideric Handel (HWV 56).

== See also ==
- Ahaz, king of Judah
- Christian messianic prophecies
- Immanuel
- Jotham, king of Judah
- Jewish messianism
- Messianic prophecies of Jesus
- Old Testament messianic prophecies quoted in the New Testament
- Pekah, king of Israel
- Pool of Bethesda
- Rezin, king of Aram
- Uzziah, king of Judah
- Related Bible parts: 2 Kings 16, 2 Kings 18, Isaiah 36, Matthew 1, John 5

== Sources ==
- Coggins, R. (2007). "22. Isaiah". In Barton, John; Muddiman, John (eds.). The Oxford Bible Commentary (first (paperback) ed.). Oxford University Press. pp. 433–486. ISBN 978-0199277186.
- Motyer, J. Alec (2015). The Prophecy of Isaiah: An Introduction & Commentary. InterVarsity Press. ISBN 9780830895243.
- Würthwein, Ernst (1995). The Text of the Old Testament. Translated by Rhodes, Erroll F. Grand Rapids, MI: Wm. B. Eerdmans. ISBN 0-8028-0788-7.
