= Matthew 1:23 =

- ← 1:22 1:24 →
- Book: Gospel of Matthew
- Christian Bible part: New Testament

Matthew 1:23 is the 23rd verse of the first chapter in the Gospel of Matthew in the New Testament. Joseph has just been informed of the nature of Jesus by an angel and in this verse the author of Matthew relates this to a quote from the Old Testament.

== Content ==
Matthews quotation is from Isaiah 7:14, in which the prophet is warning King Ahaz against joining the kings of Israel and Syria in their coalition against the Assyrians. In Isaiah 7:1-10 contains Isaiah's prophesy, and Isaiah 7:11-16 sets out the prophet's "sign":

7:11 יא שְׁאַל-לְךָ אוֹת, מֵעִם יְהוָה אֱלֹהֶיךָ; הַעְמֵק שְׁאָלָה, אוֹ הַגְבֵּהַּ לְמָעְלָה.

"Ask a sign from the Lord your God, from lowest Sheol or from highest heaven."

7:12 יב וַיֹּאמֶר, אָחָז: לֹא-אֶשְׁאַל וְלֹא-אֲנַסֶּה, אֶת-יְהוָה.

But Ahaz said, "I will not ask, and I will not test the Lord."

7:13 יג וַיֹּאמֶר, שִׁמְעוּ-נָא בֵּית דָּוִד: הַמְעַט מִכֶּם הַלְאוֹת אֲנָשִׁים, כִּי תַלְאוּ גַּם אֶת-אֱלֹהָי.

Then he retorted: "Listen, house of David! Is it not enough to try the patience of men? Will you also try the patience of my God?

7:14 יד לָכֵן יִתֵּן אֲדֹנָי הוּא, לָכֶם--אוֹת: הִנֵּה הָעַלְמָה, הָרָה וְיֹלֶדֶת בֵּן, וְקָרָאת שְׁמוֹ, עִמָּנוּ אֵל.

therefore the Lord himself shall give you a sign: the maiden is with child and she will bear a son, and will call his name Immanuel.

7:15 טו חֶמְאָה וּדְבַשׁ, יֹאכֵל--לְדַעְתּוֹ מָאוֹס בָּרָע, וּבָחוֹר בַּטּוֹב.

By the time he learns to reject the bad and choose the good, he will be eating curds and honey.

7:16 טז כִּי בְּטֶרֶם יֵדַע הַנַּעַר, מָאֹס בָּרָע--וּבָחֹר בַּטּוֹב: תֵּעָזֵב הָאֲדָמָה אֲשֶׁר אַתָּה קָץ, מִפְּנֵי שְׁנֵי מְלָכֶיהָ.

For before the child knows to reject the bad and choose the good, desolation will come upon the land of the two kings before whom you now cower."

According to Marvin A. Sweeney, a sign, in this context, means a special event which confirms the prophet's words. Ahaz's sign is to be the birth of a son to an almah, who will name him Immanuel, "God is with us", but the significance of the sign is not the identity of the child or his mother but the meaning of his name ("God is with us") and the role it plays in identifying the length of time before God will destroy the Ephraimite-Syrian coalition (before the child learns right from wrong).

In the King James Version of the Bible the text of Isaiah 7:14 reads:

Behold, a virgin shall be with child, and shall bring forth a
son, and they shall call his name Emmanuel, which being
interpreted is, God with us.

The World English Bible translates the passage as:

"Behold, the virgin shall be with child, and shall bring
forth a son. They shall call his name Immanuel;" which is,
being interpreted, "God with us."

For a collection of other versions see BibleHub Matthew 1:23

== Analysis ==
Matthew's use of the Greek word parthenos, meaning "virgin" to render the Hebrew word almah, meaning a young woman of childbearing age who has not yet born a child, springs from his use of the Greek Septuagint (LXX) version of Isaiah rather than the Hebrew version. His personal alteration to the passage is to change the phrase "they shall name" to "you shall name", so that Immanuel becomes a name given by Joseph rather than title proclaimed by the people (although the author still treats the name as a title as Joseph actually names his son Jesus).

== See also ==
- Nativity of Jesus
- Related Bible parts: Isaiah 7, Luke 1

== Sources ==
- Childs, Brevard S (2001). Isaiah. Westminster John Knox Press. ISBN 978-0664221430.
- Sweeney, Marvin A (1996). Isaiah 1–39: with an introduction to prophetic literature. Eerdmans. ISBN 9780802841001.

Preceded by Matthew 1:22	Gospel of Matthew; Chapter 1	Succeeded by Matthew 1:24
