= Isaiah 10 =

Book of Isaiah, chapter 10

- ← chapter 9 chapter 11 →
- The Great Isaiah Scroll, the best preserved of the biblical scrolls found at Qumran from the second century BC, contains all the verses in this chapter.
- Book: Book of Isaiah
- Hebrew Bible part: Nevi'im
- Order in the Hebrew part: 5
- Category: Latter Prophets
- Christian Bible part: Old Testament
- Order in the Christian part: 23

Isaiah 10 is the tenth chapter of the Book of Isaiah in the Hebrew Bible or the Old Testament of the Christian Bible. This book contains prophesies attributed to the prophet Isaiah, and is one of the Prophetic Books.

== Text ==
The original text was written in Hebrew language. This chapter is divided into 34 verses.

=== Textual witnesses ===
Some early manuscripts containing the text of this chapter in Hebrew are of the Masoretic Text tradition, which includes the Codex Cairensis (895), the Petersburg Codex of the Prophets (916), Aleppo Codex (10th century), Codex Leningradensis (1008).

Fragments containing parts of this chapter were found among the Dead Sea Scrolls (3rd century BC or later):

- 1QIsa^{a}: complete
- 1QIsa^{b}: extant: verses 16‑19
- 4QIsa^{c} (4Q57): extant: verses 23‑32
- 4QIsa^{e} (4Q59): extant: verses 1‑10

There is also a translation into Koine Greek known as the Septuagint, made in the last few centuries BCE. Extant ancient manuscripts of the Septuagint version include Codex Vaticanus (B; $\mathfrak{G}$^{B}; 4th century), Codex Sinaiticus (S; BHK: $\mathfrak{G}$^{S}; 4th century), Codex Alexandrinus (A; $\mathfrak{G}$^{A}; 5th century) and Codex Marchalianus (Q; $\mathfrak{G}$^{Q}; 6th century).

== Parashot ==
The parashah sections listed here are based on the Aleppo Codex. Isaiah 10 is a part of the Prophecies about Judah and Israel (Isaiah 1-12). {P}: open parashah; {S}: closed parashah.

{S} 10:1-4 {P} 10:5-11 {P} 10:12-15 {P} 10:16-19 {S} 10:20-23 {P} 10:24-32 {P} 10:33-34 {S}

== Woe to tyrants (10:1–4) ==
=== Verse 1 ===
Woe to those who decree unrighteous decrees

and who write unjust judgments which they have prescribed

Verses 1–4 function as a bridge between series of passages ending with the same refrain (cf. verse 4; continuing the discourse of Isaiah 9, and extends the "woes" set out in chapter 5), and the attack on Assyria, which shares one introduction.

=== Verse 4 ===
Without me they shall bow down under the prisoners,

and they shall fall under the slain.

For all this his anger is not turned away,

but his hand is stretched out still.

The refrain "For all this ... still" first appeared in Isaiah 5:25 and also appears here as well as in Isaiah 9:12, 9:17, and 9:21.

== Judgment on Assyria (10:5–19) ==
Isaiah condemns Assyria for not realising that it is "an instrument of divine wrath upon all Israel":

"Can an ax claim to be greater than the one who uses it?

== A remnant of Israel shall return (10:20–34) ==
=== Verse 21 ===
The remnant shall return, even the remnant of Jacob, to the mighty God.

- "[The] mighty God": from Hebrew אֵל גִּבּוֹר, ʾel gibbor, appears only here and in Isaiah 9:6, although similar titles appear in Deuteronomy 10:17 and Nehemiah 9:32 ["the great, mighty, and awesome God"] and in Jeremiah 32:18 ["the great and mighty God"]; all titles refer to God.

=== Verses 22–23 ===
For though your people, O Israel, be as the sand of the sea,

A remnant of them will return;

The destruction decreed shall overflow with righteousness.
For the Lord God of hosts

Will make a determined end
In the midst of all the land.

There verses are cited by the Apostle Paul in his Epistle to the Romans (chapter 9:27–28).

== See also ==
- Paul of Tarsus
- Related Bible parts: Romans 9

== Sources ==
- Coggins, R (2007). "22. Isaiah". In Barton, John; Muddiman, John (eds.). The Oxford Bible Commentary (first (paperback) ed.). Oxford University Press. pp. 433–486. ISBN 978-0199277186.
- Ulrich, Eugene, ed. (2010). The Biblical Qumran Scrolls: Transcriptions and Textual Variants. Brill.
- Würthwein, Ernst (1995). The Text of the Old Testament. Translated by Rhodes, Erroll F. Grand Rapids, MI: Wm. B. Eerdmans. ISBN 0-8028-0788-7.
