= Maher-shalal-hash-baz =

Second mentioned prophetic-name child in Revelations chapter 7–9

"Maher-shalal-hash-baz" (Note: /ˌmeɪhər ʃælæl ˈhæʃ bɑːz/; Hebrew: מַהֵר שָׁלָל חָשׁ בַּז, Mahēr šālāl ḥāš baz – "Hurry to the spoils!" or "He has made haste to the plunder!") is the second prophetic name mentioned in Isaiah chapter 8–9.

== Biblical accounts ==
The name is mentioned twice in the Hebrew Bible, both times in the Book of Isaiah chapter 8:

Isaiah 8:1

Moreover the LORD said unto me, Take thee a great roll and write in it with a man's pen concerning Mahershalalhashbaz.

Isaiah 8:3

And I went unto the prophetess; and she conceived and bore a son. Then said the LORD to me, Call his name Mahershalalhashbaz.

== Analysis ==
The child Maher-shalal-hash-baz is the second prophetic-name child after the birth of Immanuel – traditionally understood as the son of Abi the bride of king Ahaz, i.e., the future king Hezekiah, by many Jewish commentators, or of another woman. The phrases maher-shalal and hash-baz are synonymous, both meaning approximately "quickly to the plunder". The name Maher-shalal-hash-baz is a reference to the impending plunder of Samaria and Damascus by the king of Assyria, Tiglath-Pileser III (734–732 BCE).

Hebrew	Transliteration	English
מַהֵר	ma-hēr	hurry or quickly
שָׁלָל	šā-lāl	loot, spoils, booty
חָשׁ	ḥāš	he hurries or he hurried
בַּז	baz	prey, spoils

This is often counted the longest name (and word) used in the Bible, though a possible longer name-phrase in Isaiah is found in Isaiah 9:5 "called Pele-joez-el-gibbor-abi-ad-sar-shalom".

The section is also quoted in the Book of Mormon.

The actor Mahershala Ali was named Mahershalalhashbaz Gilmore at his birth.

== See also ==
- Isaiah
