= MANEA =

Protein-coding gene in the species Homo sapiens

Identifiers
- Aliases: MANEA, ENDO, hEndo, mannosidase endo-alpha
- External IDs: OMIM: 612327; MGI: 2444484; GeneCards: MANEA
Enzyme activity
EC #	BRENDA	ExPASy	KEGG	MetaCyc
3.2.1.130	↗	↗	↗	↗

Gene location (Human)
Chr.	Chromosome 6 (human)
Band	6q16.1	Start	95,577,485 bp
Band	6q16.1	End	95,609,470 bp

Gene location (Mouse)
Chr.	Chromosome 4 (mouse)
Band	4|4 A3	Start	26,324,506 bp
Band	4|4 A3	End	26,346,891 bp
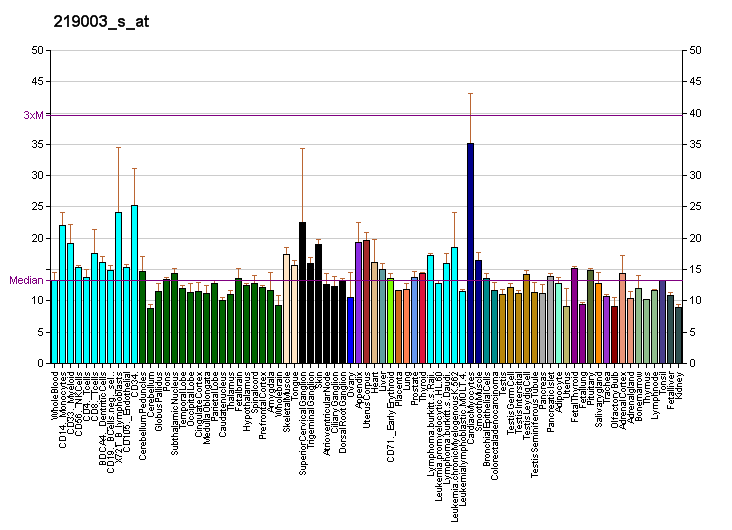
RNA expression pattern
Bgee	Human / Mouse (ortholog); Top expressed in: ventricular zone; Achilles tendon; gonad; retinal pigment epithelium; rectum; islet of Langerhans; testicle; jejunal mucosa; ganglionic eminence; gallbladder / Top expressed in: olfactory epithelium; otolith organ; utricle; renal corpuscle; epithelium of lens; medullary collecting duct; sciatic nerve; Epithelium of choroid plexus; hand; endothelial cell of lymphatic vessel; More reference expression data
BioGPS	More reference expression data
Gene ontology
Molecular function	hydrolase activity; alpha-mannosidase activity; glycoprotein endo-alpha-1,2-mannosidase activity; hydrolase activity, acting on glycosyl bonds
Cellular component	integral component of membrane; Golgi membrane; Golgi apparatus; membrane
Biological process	carbohydrate metabolic process
Sources:Amigo / QuickGO
Orthologs
Databases	NCBI: entry; OMA: entry
Species	Human	Mouse
Entrez	79694	242362
Ensembl	ENSG00000172469	ENSMUSG00000040520
UniProt	Q5SRI9	Q6NXH2
RefSeq (mRNA)	NM_024641	NM_172865
RefSeq (protein)	NP_078917	NP_766453
Location (UCSC)	Chr 6: 95.58 – 95.61 Mb	Chr 4: 26.32 – 26.35 Mb
PubMed search
- Wikidata
View/Edit Human	View/Edit Mouse

Glycoprotein endo-alpha-1,2-mannosidase is an enzyme that in humans is encoded by the MANEA gene.
