= Governor of Jerusalem Seal =

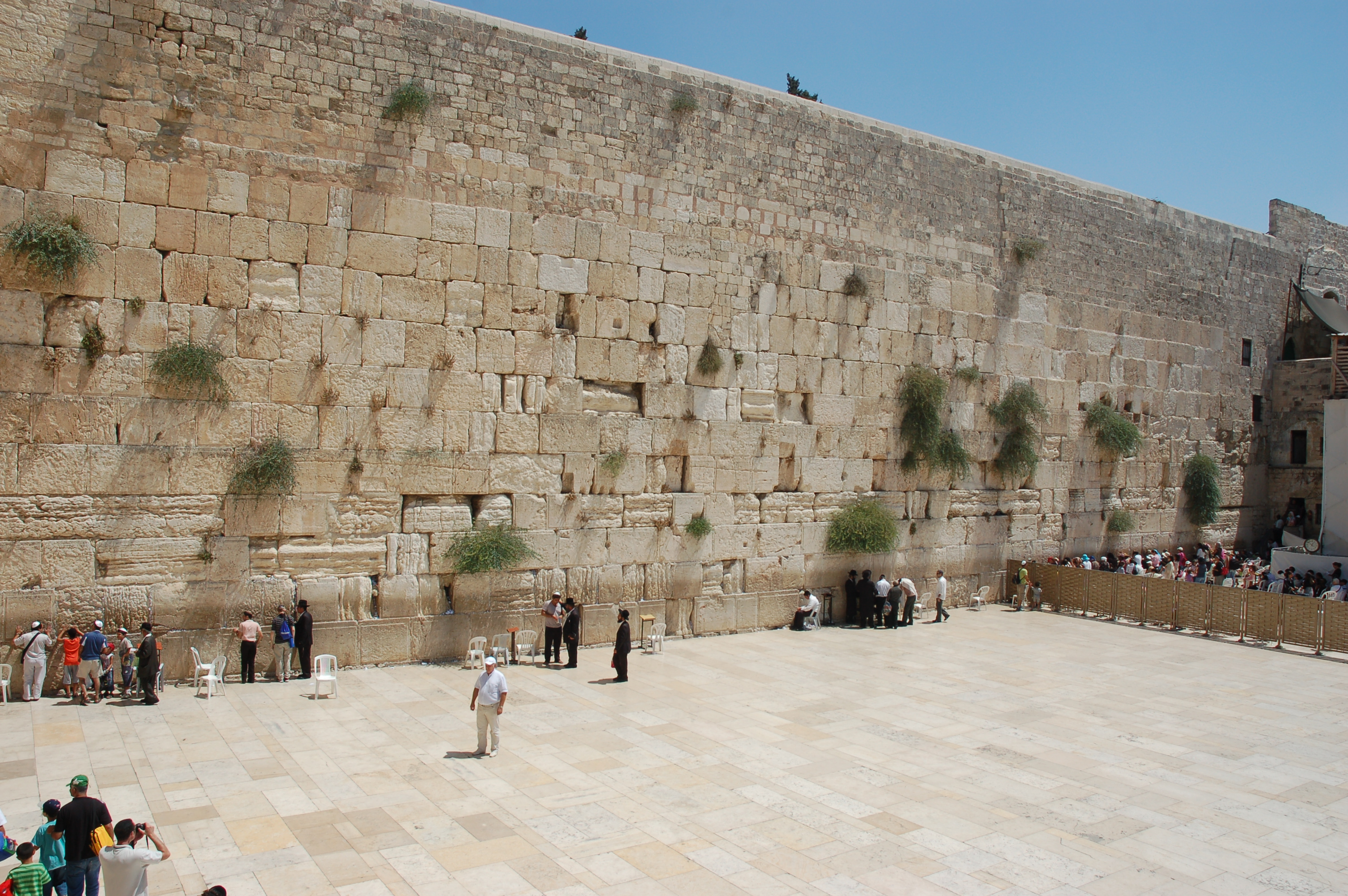
- Western Wall
- Material: Clay
- Size: button sized
- Height: 2-3 mm thick
- Writing: Paleo Hebrew
- Created: 8th century BCE
- Discovered: Jerusalem, Israel
- Period: First Temple Period

The Governor of Jerusalem Seal is an ancient Clay artifact that dates back to the First Temple period. It was found in Jerusalem, then the capital of the Kingdom of Judah. Written in the paleo-Hebrew alphabet, it is part of a larger group of artifacts known as Canaanite and Aramaic seal inscriptions.

== The Seal ==
=== Discovery ===
Archaeologist Shimon Cohen discovered a clay seal from the 8th century BCE near the Western Wall during an excavation with the IAA.

=== Appearance ===
The seal bears an engraving showing two men wearing robes and facing each other as if in a mirror.

Below them is an inscription in Paleo Hebrew that reads

Belonging to the governor of the city

Hebrew to English Translation:

“le-sar ha-ir”

=== Usage ===
In an IAA release, Weksler-Bdolah said:

"The seal had been attached to an important transport and served as some sort of logo, or as a tiny souvenir, which was sent on behalf of the governor of the city."

== See also ==
- Isaiah bulla
- King Ahaz's Seal
- King Hezekiah bulla
- LMLK Seals
- Shema seal
- Yeho'ezer ben Hosh'ayahu seal
- Jerusalem Stone
