= Canaanite and Aramaic seal inscriptions =

Ancient Northwest Semitic seal inscriptions

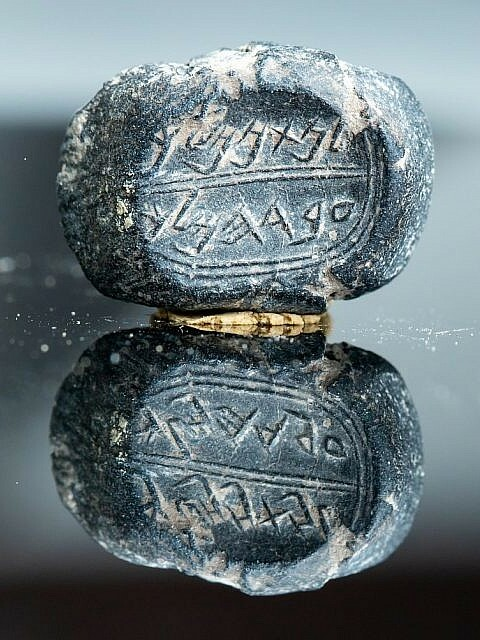
The "Nathan-melech" bulla, an inscribed ring seal discovered in Jerusalem in 2019

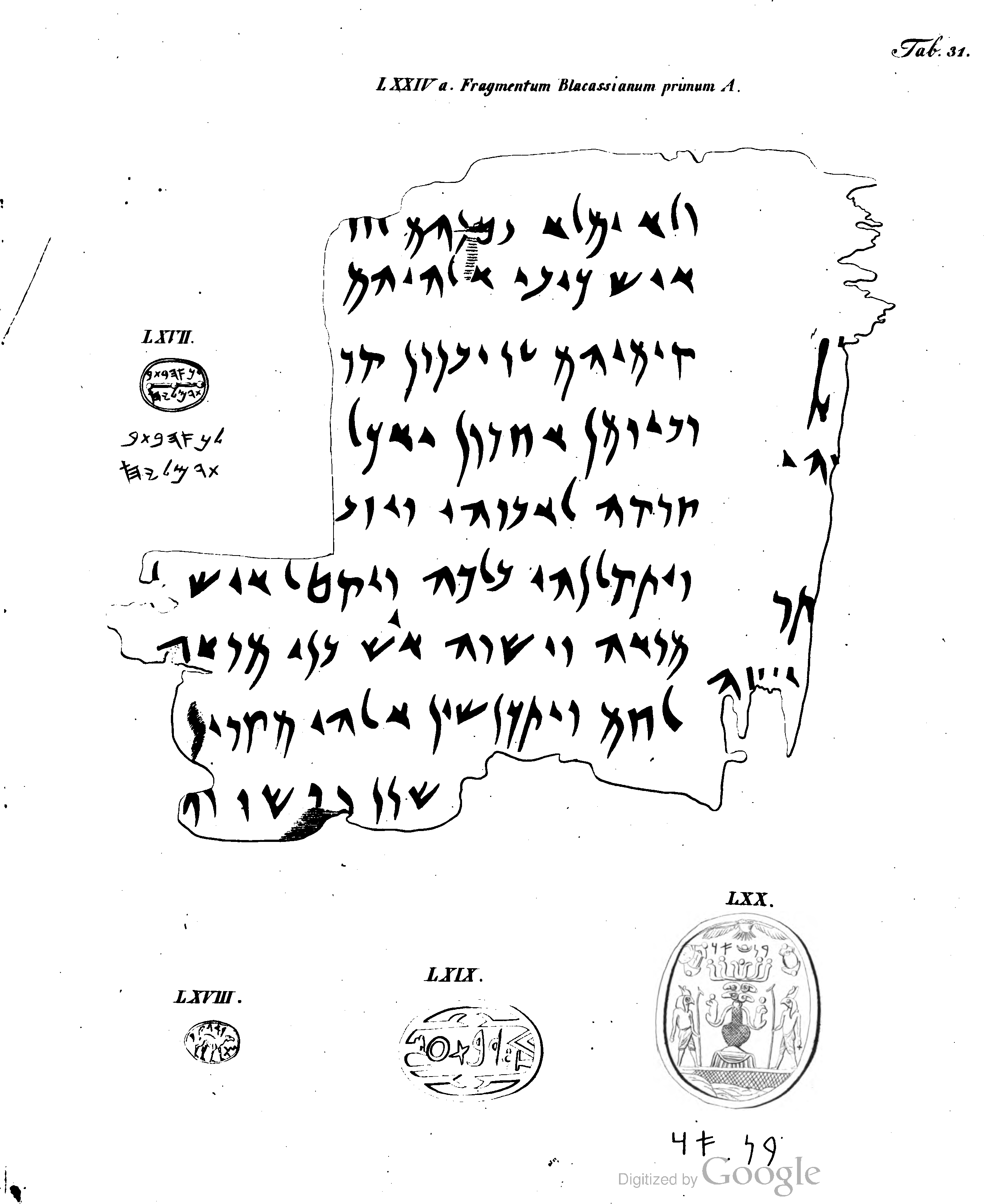
Four inscribed seals, alongside the Blacas papyrus in Gesenius's 1837 Scripturae Linguaeque Phoeniciae

Canaanite and Aramaic seal inscriptions are short texts engraved on personal seals and bullae used in the ancient Near East during the first millennium BCE. Written primarily in Phoenician, Hebrew and Aramaic, the inscriptions typically record personal names, patronymics, titles, or brief formulas. They are an important source for the study of wider Canaanite and Aramaic inscriptions, palaeography and onomastics.

== Function and characteristics ==
Seals in the region were initially associated with protective or symbolic functions, and later became administrative tools used to authenticate documents and property. Most are stamp seals, often of scaraboid form, and many are decorated with figural or symbolic motifs in addition to inscriptions.

Most such stamp seals date approximately from the 9th to the 5th centuries BCE.

The inscriptions are usually brief, most commonly giving the name and patronymic of the seal owner. In some cases, titles, the name of a superior, or a blessing formula are included.

Some of the seals show theophoric names, including divine elements such as -yahu and -baʿal.

== Corpus ==
=== History of research ===
The scholarly study of Semitic seal inscriptions began in the late nineteenth century, with pioneering publications by scholars such as Charles Clermont-Ganneau, Eugène-Melchior de Vogüé, and Moritz Abraham Levy. Early corpora relied heavily on museum collections and the antiquities market, often without secure archaeological provenance.

=== Classification ===
Moritz Abraham Levy's 1869 Siegel und Gemmen was the first publication to distinguish between Aramaic, Hebrew and Phoenician on the seals. According to Levy:

The content, if one considers the lexical and grammatical features of the inscription, clarifies the language and thus the nationality only in part. A single little word such as בן (“son”), של (“of”), or אשת (“wife”) may already indicate that we are dealing with non-Aramaeans, though the assistance offered by the grammatical form of the name should also not be disregarded. If doubts still remain, then in the last instance the form of the script decides. For it is possible to specify quite definite distinguishing characteristics for Aramaic, Phoenician, and Old Hebrew writing. These scripts, having originated from a common source, over time assumed particular types through frequent use; guided by these typological forms, a more precise classification can be established. Since, however, the inscriptions on the monuments with which we are dealing here are mostly very short, many doubts still remain even when these distinguishing features are taken into account, as will become clear later. Once the decision between Aramaeans and Canaanites (as we shall provisionally call the West Semites) has been made, it is then necessary to investigate further to which of the Canaanite peoples the object in question may have belonged. In order not to lose ourselves in overly minute investigations, we consider only two peoples here: the Hebrews and the Phoenicians. Yet even here the attribution is not easy, since linguistic features are generally shared by both peoples, and the presence of symbols and pictorial representations is not such a decisive witness—as one might initially suppose—for one people or the other, as will be shown more precisely below. As a rule, the type of script must ultimately decide the matter; for younger monuments it is a better guide than for older ones.

More than a century later, the primary modern corpus, Avigad and Sass' 1997 The Corpus of West Semitic Stamp Seals (WSS), provided a similar explanation. The WSS explains that “nationality” is the primary principle used to classify seals, determined by a combination of script, language, names, and iconography, though palaeography "outweigh[ed] all others". Over time, some have been revised and reclassified, or remain uncertain. The WSS's authors emphasize that the classification remains provisional: "we are still far from achieving a definitive classification". According to Avigad and Sass: "There is a great similarity among the scripts and the onomasticon of the various West Semitic peoples, making it difficult to distinguish between the different groups of seals."

=== Authenticity and forgeries ===
Forgery is a significant concern in assessing the corpus, as there has been significant demand among collectors, and the items are small and forgery is difficult to detect. Questions of authenticity have played a significant role in the study of seal inscriptions. From the nineteenth century onward, scholars debated whether certain seals represented genuine ancient objects or modern forgeries, especially when seals combined iconographic elements from different cultural traditions.

The numbers of known seals allocated by "nationality" is significantly different from the wider corpus of known Canaanite and Aramaic inscriptions; Hebrew forms a large majority of the seals and bullae, whereas for wider inscriptions, Hebrew is a small minority and Phoenician and Aramaic are the majority.

Writing in 2014, Philippe Bordreuil suggested that we can be certain only of the 164 seal inscriptions which were known prior to the publication of notable monumental descriptions that could be easily copied, as well as those found subsequently in controlled archaeological excavations:

- 44 Hebrew
- 6 Phoenician
- 57 Aramaic
- 34 Ammonite
- 17 Moabite
- 6 Edomite

A number of biblical archeology publishers, such as the Archaeological Institute of America and the American Schools of Oriental Research, have banned publication of articles and papers covering unprovenanced artifacts such as seals and bullae.

=== Earliest published ===
The table below lists all the inscribed seals published before 1850, ordered by the date they were found.

Language	Image	Inscription	WSS No.	Century BCE	Material	Known Since	Published
Phoenician (disputed)		lʾbybʿl	1122	8th	Sardonyx scaraboid	1726	Gori, 1726
Phoenician		lʾḥtmlk ʾšt yšʿ	1102	8th	Agate scaraboid	1791	Lajard 1837
Phoenician		bnʾw/r	728	6th	White stone scaraboid (unknown location)	1791	Tassie and Raspe 1791 (35), Gesenius LXX
Aramaic		lhwdw sprʾ	754	7th	Green jasper scarab	1791	Tassie and Raspe 1791 CIS II 84, BM E48508
Hebrew	An inscription	lbnyhw bn šḥr	108	7th (?)	Onyx scaraboid	1812	Clarke 1813
Moabite		lkmšṣdq	1036	8th	Porphyry scarab	1826	
Aramaic	An inscription	lmrʾ hd	809	7th	Carnelian scarab	1828	Hamaker, 1828
Hebrew		lnʾhbt bt dmlyhw	39	7th	Burnt carnelian scaraboid	1837	Gesenius LXVII
Aramaic		lsrgd	–	Late 9th	Quartz cylinder seal	1837	Gesenius 1837
Aramaic		lnbrb	817	Mid 7th	Agate scaraboid	1837	CIS II 91
Aramaic		lʿzy	1116	Late 8th / early 7th	Agate scaraboid (missing)	1837	Lajard 1837, CIS II 90
Phoenician		lbʿlytn ʾšʾl mʾš lmlqrt bṣr	719	5th–4th	Chalcedony scaraboid	1843	
Hebrew		lʿbdyhw bn yšb	290	Late 8th / early 7th	Jasper scaraboid	1846	
Aramaic		lpltḥdn	–	8th	Carnelian cylinder seal	1847	Lajard 1847, CIS II 80
Aramaic		lmmh	–	8th	Unknown scaraboid (missing)	1847–49	Lajard 1847–49
Aramaic		ḥnky	795	Early 6th	Chalcedony octagonal conoid	1849	Lajard 1847–49
Hebrew		lntnyhw bn ʿbdyhw	279	Early 7th	Chalcedony conoid	1849	
Ammonite		ltmkʾl bdmlkm	853	6th	Octagonal conoid	1849	CIS II 90, BM 102971

=== Wider corpus, including unprovenanced ===
The Corpus of West Semitic Stamp Seals (WSS) states that, at the time of its publication in 1997, approximately 1,591 West Semitic inscribed seals, sealings, and related stamped objects were known when cylinder seals are included, or about 1,511 when they are excluded. Within this larger body, the WSS defines a principal working corpus of 1,189 stamp seals used for detailed study. Of these, 180 are recorded as having secure archaeological provenance, or 85-88 securely provenanced seals excluding a small number of unrepresentative large hoards.

The core WSS corpus is as follows:

	Unprovenanced				Provenanced			
Category	Seals	Bullae	Handles	Total	Seals	Bullae	Handles	Total
Hebrew	399	262	50	711	29	57	46	132
Phoenician	36	2		38	3	1		4
Aramaic	97	8	2	107	6	7	1	14
Ammonite	148	1		149	10	1		11
Moabite	41	1		42	3			3
Edomite	7	2	1	10	3	2	1	6
Philistine?	4	1		5	3	1		4
Hebrew-Phoenician	1			1				
Hebrew-Aramaic	5			5				
Hebrew-Ammonite	1			1				
Hebrew or Moabite	4			4	1			1
Moabite or Edomite	7			7				
Phoenician or Aramaic	21			21	1			1
Aramaic or Ammonite	18			18	1			1
Undefined	70			70	3			3
Pseudo-script				5				
Doubtful and forged				21				
West Semitic?				2				
Total	859	277	53	1217	63	69	48	180

=== Provenanced ===
The 88 core provenanced seals and bullae (excluding handles), excluding LMLK seals, the Avigad hoard and the City of David hoard is:

Region	Site	Hebrew	Phoenician	Aramaic	Ammonite	Moabite	Edomite	Philist.?	Misc.
Palestine (51)	Acre (2)		716, 732						
Palestine (51)	Aroer (1)						1055		
Palestine (51)	Arad (5)	70, 71, 72, 111, 132							
Palestine (51)	Ashdod (1)							1065	
Palestine (51)	Atlit (1)			777					
Palestine (51)	Beersheba (1)	661							
Palestine (51)	Beit Shemesh (2)	52, 293							
Palestine (51)	Beth Zur (1)	412							
Palestine (51)	Dan (3)	669, 692							1165 (Undef.)
Palestine (51)	En Gedi (2)	94, 172							
Palestine (51)	Tell el-Far'ah (South) (1)							1069	
Palestine (51)	Gibeon (2)	220		757					
Palestine (51)	Tell el-Hesi (1)	568							
Palestine (51)	Tell Jemmeh (1)							1068	
Palestine (51)	Jerusalem (6)	35, 147, 150, 210, 261, 326							
Palestine (51)	Tell Judeideh (2)	536, 639							
Palestine (51)	Kiriath-Jearim (1)	212							
Palestine (51)	Lachish (6)	59, 350, 360, 385, 405, 498							
Palestine (51)	Tel Megiddo (4)	2, 85, 160							1124 (Undef.)
Palestine (51)	Tel Michal (1)	162							
Palestine (51)	Tell en-Nasbeh (2)	8		800					
Palestine (51)	Revadim (1)							1067	
Palestine (51)	Samaria (3)	419 (W. Daliyeh), 711							1078 (He-Mo)
Palestine (51)	Shechem (1)	224							
Transjordan (15)	Amman (5)			859, 916, 944, 973	1011				
Transjordan (15)	Busaira (1)					1050			
Transjordan (15)	Deir Alla (1)			988					
Transjordan (15)	Tell el-Kheleifeh (2)					1051, 1054			
Transjordan (15)	Tell el-Mazar (2)			872					1109 (Ar-Am)
Transjordan (15)	Umm el-Biyara (1)					1049			
Transjordan (15)	Tall al-Umayri (3)			860, 886, 977					
Phoenicia & the West (4)	Byblos (1)			990					
Phoenicia & the West (4)	Carthage (1)	185							
Phoenicia & the West (4)	Cádiz (1)	267							
Phoenicia & the West (4)	Tharros (1)		745						
Syria (5)	Carchemish (1)			774					
Syria (5)	Hama (2)			760, 768					
Syria (5)	Til Barsib (1)								1100 (Ph-Ar)
Syria (5)	Zincirli (1)			750					
Mesopotamia (12)	Babylon (1)					1048			
Mesopotamia (12)	Khorsabad (3)		743	755, 843					
Mesopotamia (12)	Nimrud (1)								1154 (Undef.)
Mesopotamia (12)	Nineveh (2)			796, 837					
Mesopotamia (12)	Nippur (1)			815 (rig. Susa)					
Mesopotamia (12)	Susa (1)			759		1020			
Mesopotamia (12)	Ur (2)				975	1034			
Egypt (1)	Elephantine (1)			788					
TOTAL (88)		40	4	14	11	3	6	4	6

== Examples ==
=== Stamp seals / bulla ===
- WSS 2, KI 4k: Shema seal, Tel Megiddo, 1904
- WSS 8, Jaazaniah seal, Tell en-Nasbeh, 1926-35
- WSS 28, WSS 306 Hilkiah seals
- WSS 407, Eliakim, son of Hilkiah bulla, unprovenanced, 1974
- KI 2: two possible Moabite
  - WSS 1020, Girsu 1877-1900 excavations
  - WSS 1036 unprovenanced, 1826
- King Ahaz's seal, unprovenanced, 1996
- Yehukal son of Shelemyahu seal, found 2005
- Gedaliah, son of Pashhur bullae, Jerusalem, 2005-08
- Shelomit seal, Jerusalem, 2008
- Isaiah bulla, Jerusalem, 2009
- King Hezekiah bulla, Jerusalem, 2009-10
- Kosher Bread Stamp, Horbat 'Uza, 2012
- Governor of Jerusalem Seal docket, Jerusalem, 2019
- Nathan-melech bulla, inscribed ring seal, Jerusalem, 2019
- Yeho'ezer ben Hosh'ayahu seal, Jerusalem, 2024
- LMLK seal
- Adadnadinakhe bricks

=== Cylinder seals ===
- BM 89152 / CIS II 100
- BM 89144 / CIS II 98
- Neirab cylinder: CIS II 75 / NE 445,3: Found in Babylon by John Felix Jones in the 1840s, sold to the British Museum

== Collection concordance ==
WSS Number	Collection Name	City / Country	Inventory Number
1102	Kunsthistorisches Museum	Vienna, Austria	2880
833	Kunsthistorisches Museum	Vienna, Austria	IX B 1615
911	Cabinet des Médailles	Paris, France	M 6456
805	Cabinet des Médailles	Paris, France	M 6761
849	Cabinet des Médailles	Paris, France	M 6762
867	Cabinet des Médailles	Paris, France	M 7338
876	Cabinet des Médailles	Paris, France	N 3316
854	Cabinet des Médailles	Paris, France	N 4128
22	Cabinet des Médailles	Paris, France	1970.428
327	Cabinet des Médailles	Paris, France	1970.766
512	Ch. Kaufmann collection	Antwerp, Belgium	-
795	Inv. Chabouillet	(France)	1017 = C 1087
828	Inv. Chabouillet	(France)	1050 = D 3389
194	Inv. Chabouillet	(France)	1050/2 = M 1253
1082	Inv. Chabouillet	(France)	1050/3 = M 8536
1184	Inv. Chabouillet	(France)	1052
1058	Inv. Chabouillet	(France)	1052/2 = K 1830
817	Inv. Chabouillet	(France)	1054 = C 1160
152	Inv. Chabouillet	(France)	1058/3 = M 1830
1039	Inv. Chabouillet	(France)	1058/4 = M 2886
978	Inv. Chabouillet	(France)	1058/5 = F 9104
985	Inv. Chabouillet	(France)	1087/2 = D 6322
292	Bibliothèque Nationale, Cabinet des Médailles	Paris, France	M 5781
1161	Bibliothèque Nationale, Cabinet des Médailles	Paris, France	M 5811
804	Bibliothèque Nationale, Cabinet des Médailles	Paris, France	M 6181
928	Walter Bick collection	Toronto, Canada	-
959	A.D. Tushingham collection	Toronto, Canada	-
785	Cairo Museum	Cairo, Egypt	JdE 25225
4	Chandon de Briailles collection	(France)	156
720	Chandon de Briailles collection	(France)	238
767	Chandon de Briailles collection	(France)	Y 23.455 bis
806	De Clercq collection	Paris, France	267
856	De Clercq collection	Paris, France	342/30
761	De Clercq collection	Paris, France	2502
934	De Clercq collection	Paris, France	2503
735	De Clercq collection	Paris, France	2504
1217	De Clercq collection	Paris, France	2505
749	De Clercq collection	Paris, France	2506
725	De Clercq collection	Paris, France	2507
734	De Clercq collection	Paris, France	2508
793	De Clercq collection	Paris, France	2509
746	De Clercq collection	Paris, France	2510
144	De Clercq collection	Paris, France	2511
857	De Clercq collection	Paris, France	2512
737	De Clercq collection	Paris, France	2513
1086	De Clercq collection	Paris, France	2514
1032	De Clercq collection	Paris, France	2515
1071	De Clercq collection	Paris, France	2517
290	De Clercq collection	Paris, France	2518
752	De Clercq collection	Paris, France	2519
49	De Clercq collection	Paris, France	2520
352	De Clercq collection	Paris, France	2521
736	De Clercq collection	Paris, France	2756
723	Fröhner collection	Paris, France	2191
1114	de Luynes collection	Paris, France	218
1093	de Luynes collection	Paris, France	223
1089	de Luynes collection	Paris, France	224
713	de Luynes collection	Paris, France	225
1150	de Luynes collection	Paris, France	226
1136	de Luynes collection	Paris, France	227
971	de Luynes collection	Paris, France	228
297	de Luynes collection	Paris, France	229
1059	de Luynes collection	Paris, France	230
279	de Luynes collection	Paris, France	327
1041	Schlumberger collection	Paris, France	319
372	Seyrig collection	Paris, France	1972.1317.117
814	Seyrig collection	Paris, France	1972.1317.119
776	Seyrig collection	Paris, France	1972.1317.120
825	Seyrig collection	Paris, France	1972.1317.121
792	Seyrig collection	Paris, France	1972.1317.122
938	Seyrig collection	Paris, France	1972.1317.123
1181	Seyrig collection	Paris, France	1972.1317.124
943	Seyrig collection	Paris, France	1972.1317.125
1019	Seyrig collection	Paris, France	1972.1317.126
173	Seyrig collection	Paris, France	1972.1317.127
780	Seyrig collection	Paris, France	1972.1317.128
1139	Seyrig collection	Paris, France	1972.1317.129
1023	Seyrig collection	Paris, France	1972.1317.130
881	Seyrig collection	Paris, France	1972.1317.131
112	Seyrig collection	Paris, France	1972.1317.132
1194	Seyrig collection	Paris, France	1972.1317.133
167	Seyrig collection	Paris, France	1972.1317.134
753	Seyrig collection	Paris, France	1972.1317.135
887	Seyrig collection	Paris, France	1972.1317.136
1003	Seyrig collection	Paris, France	1972.1317.137
1002	Seyrig collection	Paris, France	1972.1317.138
1099	Seyrig collection	Paris, France	1972.1317.139
819	Seyrig collection	Paris, France	1972.1317.140
950	Seyrig collection	Paris, France	1972.1317.141
1119	Seyrig collection	Paris, France	1972.1317.143
Cf. 1195	Seyrig collection	Paris, France	1972.1343.1
908	Seyrig collection	Paris, France	1972.1343.2
826	Seyrig collection	Paris, France	1972.1343.3
318	M. de Bry collection	Belgium	-
369	M. de Bry collection	Belgium	-
831	V. Klagsbald collection	Belgium	-
1025	V. Klagsbald collection	Belgium	-
196	M.d.S. collection	(Unknown)	-
1044	Musée "Bible et Terre Sainte"	Paris, France	5117
1160	Musée "Bible et Terre Sainte"	Paris, France	5120
129	Musée "Bible et Terre Sainte"	Paris, France	5121
340	Musée "Bible et Terre Sainte"	Paris, France	5122
895	Musée "Bible et Terre Sainte"	Paris, France	5127
1021	Musée "Bible et Terre Sainte"	Paris, France	5128
799	Musée "Bible et Terre Sainte"	Paris, France	6050
929	Musée "Bible et Terre Sainte"	Paris, France	6053
880	Louvre	Paris, France	A.O. 1134 / 5818
764	Louvre	Paris, France	A.O. 1937 / 6222
779	Louvre	Paris, France	A.O. 2157
1110	Louvre	Paris, France	A.O. 2292
848	Louvre	Paris, France	A.O. 2293
1202	Louvre	Paris, France	A.O. 2483
1148	Louvre	Paris, France	A.O. 3175
(880)	Louvre	Paris, France	A.O. 5818 see A.O. 1134
843	Louvre	Paris, France	A.O. 5828
888	Louvre	Paris, France	A.O. 5830
743	Louvre	Paris, France	A.O. 5831
1103	Louvre	Paris, France	A.O. 6006
3	Louvre	Paris, France	A.O. 6216
(764)	Louvre	Paris, France	A.O. 6222 see A.O. 1937
1203	Louvre	Paris, France	A.O. 6628
803	Louvre	Paris, France	A.O. 6629
738	Louvre	Paris, France	A.O. 9048
741	Louvre	Paris, France	A.O. 10882
758	Louvre	Paris, France	A.O. 11205
1155	Louvre	Paris, France	A.O. 24413
1193	Louvre	Paris, France	A.O. 29139
1020	Louvre	Paris, France	MNB 1500
850	Louvre	Paris, France	MNB 1842
(759)	Louvre	Paris, France	cast 2223 (location of original not reported)
165	Vorderasiatisches Museum Berlin	Berlin, Germany	VA 32
166	Vorderasiatisches Museum Berlin	Berlin, Germany	VA 33
832	Vorderasiatisches Museum Berlin	Berlin, Germany	VA 34*
1170	Vorderasiatisches Museum Berlin	Berlin, Germany	VA 35
44	Vorderasiatisches Museum Berlin	Berlin, Germany	VA 766
39	Vorderasiatisches Museum Berlin	Berlin, Germany	VA 771*
728	Vorderasiatisches Museum Berlin	Berlin, Germany	VA 772*
717	Vorderasiatisches Museum Berlin	Berlin, Germany	VA 2791
1123	Vorderasiatisches Museum Berlin	Berlin, Germany	VA 2821
1036	Vorderasiatisches Museum Berlin	Berlin, Germany	VA 2826
343	Vorderasiatisches Museum Berlin	Berlin, Germany	VA 2830
180	Vorderasiatisches Museum Berlin	Berlin, Germany	VA 2839
772	Vorderasiatisches Museum Berlin	Berlin, Germany	VA 2948
370	Vorderasiatisches Museum Berlin	Berlin, Germany	VA 8367*
1048	Vorderasiatisches Museum Berlin	Berlin, Germany	VA 14157
750	Vorderasiatisches Museum Berlin	Berlin, Germany	VA S 3706
788	Vorderasiatisches Museum Berlin	Berlin, Germany	P. 18468
53	J. Samel collection	Munich, Germany	-
109	J. Samel collection	Munich, Germany	-
124	J. Samel collection	Munich, Germany	-
136	J. Samel collection	Munich, Germany	-
169	J. Samel collection	Munich, Germany	-
197	J. Samel collection	Munich, Germany	-
266	J. Samel collection	Munich, Germany	-
284	J. Samel collection	Munich, Germany	-
399	J. Samel collection	Munich, Germany	-
439	J. Samel collection	Munich, Germany	-
494	J. Samel collection	Munich, Germany	-
514A	J. Samel collection	Munich, Germany	-
522	J. Samel collection	Munich, Germany	-
535B	J. Samel collection	Munich, Germany	-
565	J. Samel collection	Munich, Germany	-
579J	J. Samel collection	Munich, Germany	-
597	J. Samel collection	Munich, Germany	-
708D	J. Samel collection	Munich, Germany	-
1141	J. Samel collection	Munich, Germany	-
14	Private collection 1	(Unknown)	-
17	Private collection 1	(Unknown)	-
58	Private collection 1	(Unknown)	-
154	Private collection 1	(Unknown)	-
317	Private collection 1	(Unknown)	-
330	Private collection 1	(Unknown)	-
739	Private collection 1	(Unknown)	-
782	Private collection 1	(Unknown)	-
810	Private collection 1	(Unknown)	-
942	Private collection 1	(Unknown)	-
1091	Private collection 1	(Unknown)	-
1115	Private collection 1	(Unknown)	-
1117	Private collection 1	(Unknown)	-
28	Private collection 2	(Unknown)	-
103	Péronne, Municipal collection	Péronne, France	-
223	Hecht Museum	Haifa, Israel	H-412
325	Hecht Museum	Haifa, Israel	H-617
898	Hecht Museum	Haifa, Israel	H-632
128	Hecht Museum	Haifa, Israel	H-634
868	Hecht Museum	Haifa, Israel	H-635
987	Hecht Museum	Haifa, Israel	H-637
1060	Hecht Museum	Haifa, Israel	H-638
395	Hecht Museum	Haifa, Israel	H-683
302	Hecht Museum	Haifa, Israel	H-785
1191	Hecht Museum	Haifa, Israel	H-786
918	Hecht Museum	Haifa, Israel	H-787
921	Hecht Museum	Haifa, Israel	H-788
1190	Hecht Museum	Haifa, Israel	H-789
73	Hecht Museum	Haifa, Israel	H-790
1018	Hecht Museum	Haifa, Israel	H-807
940	Hecht Museum	Haifa, Israel	H-808
388	Hecht Museum	Haifa, Israel	H-881
892	Hecht Museum	Haifa, Israel	H-917
100	Hecht Museum	Haifa, Israel	H-918
927	Hecht Museum	Haifa, Israel	H-919
1037	Hecht Museum	Haifa, Israel	H-920
710	Hecht Museum	Haifa, Israel	H-1420
1080	Hecht Museum	Haifa, Israel	H-1486
756	Hecht Museum	Haifa, Israel	H-1488
790	Hecht Museum	Haifa, Israel	H-1489
91	Hecht Museum	Haifa, Israel	H-1490
32	Hecht Museum	Haifa, Israel	H-1491
120	Hecht Museum	Haifa, Israel	H-1492
257	Hecht Museum	Haifa, Israel	H-1673
118	Hecht Museum	Haifa, Israel	H-1740
394	Hecht Museum	Haifa, Israel	H-1741
338	Hecht Museum	Haifa, Israel	H-1743
57	Hecht Museum	Haifa, Israel	H-1744
1177	Hecht Museum	Haifa, Israel	H-1746
662	Hecht Museum	Haifa, Israel	H-1787
1133	Hecht Museum	Haifa, Israel	H-1788
48	Hecht Museum	Haifa, Israel	H-1923
1113	Hecht Museum	Haifa, Israel	H-1924
1112	Hecht Museum	Haifa, Israel	H-1925
1163	Hecht Museum	Haifa, Israel	H-1926
1152	Hecht Museum	Haifa, Israel	H-1927
1126	Hecht Museum	Haifa, Israel	H-1928
966	Hecht Museum	Haifa, Israel	H-1930
1192	Hecht Museum	Haifa, Israel	H-1931
775	Hecht Museum	Haifa, Israel	H-1932
42	Hecht Museum	Haifa, Israel	H-1936
870	Hecht Museum	Haifa, Israel	H-1937
40	Hecht Museum	Haifa, Israel	H-1938
157	Hecht Museum	Haifa, Israel	H-1942
321	Hecht Museum	Haifa, Israel	H-1944
306	Hecht Museum	Haifa, Israel	H-1945
348	Hecht Museum	Haifa, Israel	H-1946
382	Hecht Museum	Haifa, Israel	H-1947
168	Hecht Museum	Haifa, Israel	H-1948
363	Hecht Museum	Haifa, Israel	H-1951
45	Hecht Museum	Haifa, Israel	H-1952
347	Hecht Museum	Haifa, Israel	H-1954
346	Hecht Museum	Haifa, Israel	H-1955
222	Hecht Museum	Haifa, Israel	H-1956
43	Hecht Museum	Haifa, Israel	H-1957
288	Hecht Museum	Haifa, Israel	H-1958
328	Hecht Museum	Haifa, Israel	H-1959
122	Hecht Museum	Haifa, Israel	H-1960
121	Hecht Museum	Haifa, Israel	H-1961
1207	Hecht Museum	Haifa, Israel	H-1962
289	Hecht Museum	Haifa, Israel	H-1963
332	Hecht Museum	Haifa, Israel	H-1965
1156	Hecht Museum	Haifa, Israel	H-1966
264	Hecht Museum	Haifa, Israel	H-1967
258	Hecht Museum	Haifa, Israel	H-1968
259	Hecht Museum	Haifa, Israel	H-1969
387	Hecht Museum	Haifa, Israel	H-1970
268	Hecht Museum	Haifa, Israel	H-1971
219	Hecht Museum	Haifa, Israel	H-1972
303	Hecht Museum	Haifa, Israel	H-1973
76	Hecht Museum	Haifa, Israel	H-1974
60	Hecht Museum	Haifa, Israel	H-1975
74	Hecht Museum	Haifa, Israel	H-1976
236	Hecht Museum	Haifa, Israel	H-1977
294	Hecht Museum	Haifa, Israel	H-1978
77	Hecht Museum	Haifa, Israel	H-1979
353	Hecht Museum	Haifa, Israel	H-1980
125	Hecht Museum	Haifa, Israel	H-1981
113	Hecht Museum	Haifa, Israel	H-1982
629E	Hecht Museum	Haifa, Israel	H-1983
489	Hecht Museum	Haifa, Israel	H-1984
584B	Hecht Museum	Haifa, Israel	H-1985
19	Hecht Museum	Haifa, Israel	H-1987
838	Hecht Museum	Haifa, Israel	H-1988
287	Hecht Museum	Haifa, Israel	H-1991
227	Hecht Museum	Haifa, Israel	H-2030
50	Hecht Museum	Haifa, Israel	H-2031
820	Hecht Museum	Haifa, Israel	H-2032
842	Hecht Museum	Haifa, Israel	H-2033
765	Hecht Museum	Haifa, Israel	H-2034
824	Hecht Museum	Haifa, Israel	H-2035
146	Hecht Museum	Haifa, Israel	H-2036
249	Hecht Museum	Haifa, Israel	H-2162
773	Hecht Museum	Haifa, Israel	H-2215
930	Hecht Museum	Haifa, Israel	H-2298
430Aâ€“G	Hecht Museum	Haifa, Israel	H-2445 to H-2451
443	Hecht Museum	Haifa, Israel	H-2452
425	Hecht Museum	Haifa, Israel	H-2453
631	Hecht Museum	Haifa, Israel	H-2456
659	Hecht Museum	Haifa, Israel	H-2457
516	Hecht Museum	Haifa, Israel	H-2458
96	Hecht Museum	Haifa, Israel	H-2543
383	Hecht Museum	Haifa, Israel	H-2561
114	Hecht Museum	Haifa, Israel	H-2617
151	Hecht Museum	Haifa, Israel	H-2618
155	Hecht Museum	Haifa, Israel	H-2619
1131	Hecht Museum	Haifa, Israel	H-2622
123	Hecht Museum	Haifa, Israel	H-2623
926	Hecht Museum	Haifa, Israel	K-7
473	Hecht Museum	Haifa, Israel	K-124
215	Hecht Museum	Haifa, Israel	REH-014
26	Hecht Museum	Haifa, Israel	REH-015
1	Hecht Museum	Haifa, Israel	REH-018
186	Hecht Museum	Haifa, Israel	REH-019
127	Hecht Museum	Haifa, Israel	REH-027
840	Hecht Museum	Haifa, Israel	REH-041
726	Hecht Museum	Haifa, Israel	REH-042
301	Hecht Museum	Haifa, Israel	REH-044
176	Hecht Museum	Haifa, Israel	REH-105
233	Hecht Museum	Haifa, Israel	REH-106
778	Bible Lands Museum	Jerusalem	1062d
1201	Bible Lands Museum	Jerusalem	1062e
958	Bible Lands Museum	Jerusalem	1094
1146	Bible Lands Museum	Jerusalem	1095
1107	Bible Lands Museum	Jerusalem	1096
1001	Bible Lands Museum	Jerusalem	1098
1164	Bible Lands Museum	Jerusalem	1099
1143	Bible Lands Museum	Jerusalem	1099a (IMJ inv. 65.11.6)
715	Bible Lands Museum	Jerusalem	1099b (IMJ inv. 69.58.144)
1087	Bible Lands Museum	Jerusalem	1099c (IMJ inv. 65.11.3)
979	Bible Lands Museum	Jerusalem	1099d (IMJ inv. 67.39.49)
763	Bible Lands Museum	Jerusalem	1099f (IMJ inv. 65.11.4)
1098	Bible Lands Museum	Jerusalem	1099g
1147	Bible Lands Museum	Jerusalem	1803
1101	Bible Lands Museum	Jerusalem	1804
862	Bible Lands Museum	Jerusalem	1810
676C	Bible Lands Museum	Jerusalem	1825
665D	Bible Lands Museum	Jerusalem	1828
1142	Bible Lands Museum	Jerusalem	1840
190	Bible Lands Museum	Jerusalem	1841
1024	Bible Lands Museum	Jerusalem	1843
148	Bible Lands Museum	Jerusalem	1844
972	Bible Lands Museum	Jerusalem	1846
366	Bible Lands Museum	Jerusalem	1847
1035	Bible Lands Museum	Jerusalem	1848
239	Bible Lands Museum	Jerusalem	2010
669	Hebrew Union College	Jerusalem	-
692A-C	Hebrew Union College	Jerusalem	-
349	Hebrew University, Institute of Archaeology	Jerusalem	733
1175	Hebrew University, Institute of Archaeology	Jerusalem	734
1097	Hebrew University, Institute of Archaeology	Jerusalem	759
192	Hebrew University, Institute of Archaeology	Jerusalem	760
1027	Hebrew University, Institute of Archaeology	Jerusalem	772
893	Hebrew University, Institute of Archaeology	Jerusalem	774
371	Hebrew University, Institute of Archaeology	Jerusalem	776
890	Hebrew University, Institute of Archaeology	Jerusalem	777
102	Hebrew University, Institute of Archaeology	Jerusalem	778
187	Hebrew University, Institute of Archaeology	Jerusalem	1985
818	Hebrew University, Institute of Archaeology	Jerusalem	2133
906	Hebrew University, Institute of Archaeology	Jerusalem	3409
298	Hebrew University, Institute of Archaeology	Jerusalem	4000
336	Hebrew University, Institute of Archaeology	Jerusalem	4119
170	Hebrew University, Institute of Archaeology	Jerusalem	4971
678G	Hebrew University, Institute of Archaeology	Jerusalem	With Jewish Quarter expedition
688	Hebrew University, Institute of Archaeology	Jerusalem	With Jewish Quarter expedition
695D	Hebrew University, Institute of Archaeology	Jerusalem	With Tel Batash expedition
705E	Hebrew University, Institute of Archaeology	Jerusalem	With City of David expedition?
748	Maritime Museum	Israel	-
1145	Hechal Shlomo Museum	Israel	-
52	Israel Antiquities Authority	Israel	J.228
198	Israel Antiquities Authority	Israel	J.894
159	Israel Antiquities Authority	Israel	J.895
164	Israel Antiquities Authority	Israel	J.896
1069	Israel Antiquities Authority	Israel	J.1064
665B	Israel Antiquities Authority	Israel	P.422
708A	Israel Antiquities Authority	Israel	P.423
667A	Israel Antiquities Authority	Israel	P.537
676A	Israel Antiquities Authority	Israel	P.541
684A	Israel Antiquities Authority	Israel	P.766
705A	Israel Antiquities Authority	Israel	P.883
703A	Israel Antiquities Authority	Israel	P.892
702A	Israel Antiquities Authority	Israel	P.1473
703B	Israel Antiquities Authority	Israel	P.1500
700B	Israel Antiquities Authority	Israel	P.1501
700C	Israel Antiquities Authority	Israel	P.1502
703C	Israel Antiquities Authority	Israel	P.3638
705B	Israel Antiquities Authority	Israel	P.3639
666A	Israel Antiquities Authority	Israel	I.95
663A	Israel Antiquities Authority	Israel	I.4936
696	Israel Antiquities Authority	Israel	I.5868
293	Israel Antiquities Authority	Israel	I.5903
677A	Israel Antiquities Authority	Israel	I.8652
670	Israel Antiquities Authority	Israel	I.8653
663C	Israel Antiquities Authority	Israel	I.8683
97	Israel Antiquities Authority	Israel	I.8915
412	Israel Antiquities Authority	Israel	31.68
(777)	Israel Antiquities Authority	Israel	32.552*
8	Israel Antiquities Authority	Israel	32.525
1166	Israel Antiquities Authority	Israel	32.2668
684B	Israel Antiquities Authority	Israel	33.2112
679A	Israel Antiquities Authority	Israel	33.2113
667E	Israel Antiquities Authority	Israel	33.2114
701D	Israel Antiquities Authority	Israel	33.2115
711	Israel Antiquities Authority	Israel	33.2232
1078	Israel Antiquities Authority	Israel	33.3150
701A	Israel Antiquities Authority	Israel	34.99
160	Israel Antiquities Authority	Israel	34.1490
701B	Israel Antiquities Authority	Israel	35.3085
59	Israel Antiquities Authority	Israel	36.1829
498	Israel Antiquities Authority	Israel	36.2258
698A	Israel Antiquities Authority	Israel	36.2259
385	Israel Antiquities Authority	Israel	38.123
697	Israel Antiquities Authority	Israel	38.715
704B	Israel Antiquities Authority	Israel	38.717
698B	Israel Antiquities Authority	Israel	39.824
679G	Israel Antiquities Authority	Israel	39.825
(1052[?])	Israel Antiquities Authority	Israel	40.451 see JAM, J.5192(?)
(1051C)	Israel Antiquities Authority	Israel	40.592 see JAM, J.2806
(1051D)	Israel Antiquities Authority	Israel	40.614 see JAM, J.2862
(1051A, B)	Israel Antiquities Authority	Israel	40.720 see JAM, J.2866
(916)	Israel Antiquities Authority	Israel	41.889 see JAM, J.252
747	Israel Antiquities Authority	Israel	44.319
1185	Israel Antiquities Authority	Israel	45.94
377	Israel Antiquities Authority	Israel	55.135
161	Israel Antiquities Authority	Israel	53-308
707H	Israel Antiquities Authority	Israel	57-1217
1084	Israel Antiquities Authority	Israel	60-65
686	Israel Antiquities Authority	Israel	62-39
673A	Israel Antiquities Authority	Israel	62-61
678E	Israel Antiquities Authority	Israel	62-62
672A	Israel Antiquities Authority	Israel	62-63
212	Israel Antiquities Authority	Israel	62-308
993	Israel Antiquities Authority	Israel	62-316
677B	Israel Antiquities Authority	Israel	62-420
312	Israel Antiquities Authority	Israel	63-432
162	Israel Antiquities Authority	Israel	63-469
701F	Israel Antiquities Authority	Israel	64-1768
707G	Israel Antiquities Authority	Israel	64-1770
663D	Israel Antiquities Authority	Israel	64-1771
740	Israel Antiquities Authority	Israel	65-321
666B	Israel Antiquities Authority	Israel	66-506
172	Israel Antiquities Authority	Israel	67-498
71	Israel Antiquities Authority	Israel	67-663
177	Israel Antiquities Authority	Israel	67-686
111	Israel Antiquities Authority	Israel	67-983
72	Israel Antiquities Authority	Israel	67-984
132	Israel Antiquities Authority	Israel	67-988
70	Israel Antiquities Authority	Israel	67-1164
94	Israel Antiquities Authority	Israel	67-1330
524	Israel Antiquities Authority	Israel	68-252/1
571	Israel Antiquities Authority	Israel	68-252/2
577	Israel Antiquities Authority	Israel	68-252/3
523	Israel Antiquities Authority	Israel	68-252/4
416	Israel Antiquities Authority	Israel	68-252/5
530A, B	Israel Antiquities Authority	Israel	68-252/6-7
1065	Israel Antiquities Authority	Israel	69-2026
1165	Israel Antiquities Authority	Israel	69-5530
716	Israel Antiquities Authority	Israel	73-216
67	Israel Antiquities Authority	Israel	74-1888
673B	Israel Antiquities Authority	Israel	75-244
35	Israel Antiquities Authority	Israel	75-466
261	Israel Antiquities Authority	Israel	76-854
679, K	Israel Antiquities Authority	Israel	76-954
568	Israel Antiquities Authority	Israel	77-387
1055	Israel Antiquities Authority	Israel	80-4
1067	Israel Antiquities Authority	Israel	80-891
326	Israel Antiquities Authority	Israel	80-1315
684I	Israel Antiquities Authority	Israel	83-2
573	Israel Antiquities Authority	Israel	84-123
441	Israel Antiquities Authority	Israel	84-124
429	Israel Antiquities Authority	Israel	84-125
511	Israel Antiquities Authority	Israel	84-126
595	Israel Antiquities Authority	Israel	84-128
518	Israel Antiquities Authority	Israel	84-129
427	Israel Antiquities Authority	Israel	84-130
510	Israel Antiquities Authority	Israel	84-131
644	Israel Antiquities Authority	Israel	84-132
464	Israel Antiquities Authority	Israel	84-133
458	Israel Antiquities Authority	Israel	84-135
470	Israel Antiquities Authority	Israel	84-136
500	Israel Antiquities Authority	Israel	84-137
541	Israel Antiquities Authority	Israel	84-138
448	Israel Antiquities Authority	Israel	84-139
420	Israel Antiquities Authority	Israel	84-140
636	Israel Antiquities Authority	Israel	84-141
482	Israel Antiquities Authority	Israel	84-142
447	Israel Antiquities Authority	Israel	84-143
450A	Israel Antiquities Authority	Israel	84-144
515	Israel Antiquities Authority	Israel	84-145
467	Israel Antiquities Authority	Israel	84-146
637	Israel Antiquities Authority	Israel	84-147
586	Israel Antiquities Authority	Israel	84-148
466	Israel Antiquities Authority	Israel	84-150
440	Israel Antiquities Authority	Israel	84-151
469	Israel Antiquities Authority	Israel	84-152
450B	Israel Antiquities Authority	Israel	84-153
626	Israel Antiquities Authority	Israel	84-154
638	Israel Antiquities Authority	Israel	84-155
509	Israel Antiquities Authority	Israel	84-156
605	Israel Antiquities Authority	Israel	84-157
474	Israel Antiquities Authority	Israel	84-158
660	Israel Antiquities Authority	Israel	84-159
459	Israel Antiquities Authority	Israel	84-160
437A, B	Israel Antiquities Authority	Israel	84-161, 84-162
508	Israel Antiquities Authority	Israel	84-163
581	Israel Antiquities Authority	Israel	84-164
596	Israel Antiquities Authority	Israel	84-165
599	Israel Antiquities Authority	Israel	84-166
463	Israel Antiquities Authority	Israel	84-167
588	Israel Antiquities Authority	Israel	84-168
668	Israel Antiquities Authority	Israel	86-192
689D	Israel Antiquities Authority	Israel	86-402
503	Israel Antiquities Authority	Israel	89-1143
643	Israel Antiquities Authority	Israel	89-1144
664	Israel Antiquities Authority	Israel	92-588
681B	Israel Antiquities Authority	Israel	93-802
(2)	Israel Antiquities Authority	Israel	Cast 230 (location of original not reported)
687	Israel Antiquities Authority	Israel	Exhibited at the Jewish Quarter
695B	Israel Antiquities Authority	Israel	Exhibited at the Shephelah Museum, Kefar Menahem
695C	Israel Antiquities Authority	Israel	Exhibited at the Jewish Quarter
706C	Israel Antiquities Authority	Israel	Israel Antiquities Authority, Judaea and Samaria archaeological staff officer 11196
705C, D(?)	Israel Antiquities Authority	Israel	-
(1087)	Israel Museum	Jerusalem, Israel	65.11.3 see BLMJ 1099c
(763)	Israel Museum	Jerusalem, Israel	65.11.4 see BLMJ 1099f
(1143)	Israel Museum	Jerusalem, Israel	65.11.6 see BLMJ 1099a
(979)	Israel Museum	Jerusalem, Israel	67.39.449 see BLMJ 1099d
1063	Israel Museum	Jerusalem, Israel	68.35.184
914	Israel Museum	Jerusalem, Israel	68.35.185
919	Israel Museum	Jerusalem, Israel	68.35.186
865	Israel Museum	Jerusalem, Israel	68.35.187
85	Israel Museum	Jerusalem, Israel	68.35.188
88	Israel Museum	Jerusalem, Israel	68.35.189
917	Israel Museum	Jerusalem, Israel	68.35.190
252	Israel Museum	Jerusalem, Israel	68.35.191
119	Israel Museum	Jerusalem, Israel	68.35.192
1198	Israel Museum	Jerusalem, Israel	68.35.193
901	Israel Museum	Jerusalem, Israel	68.35.194
378	Israel Museum	Jerusalem, Israel	68.35.195
1180	Israel Museum	Jerusalem, Israel	68.35.196
126	Israel Museum	Jerusalem, Israel	68.35.197
55	Israel Museum	Jerusalem, Israel	68.35.199
953	Israel Museum	Jerusalem, Israel	68.35.200
996	Israel Museum	Jerusalem, Israel	68.35.201
262	Israel Museum	Jerusalem, Israel	68.35.202
992	Israel Museum	Jerusalem, Israel	68.35.203
1153	Israel Museum	Jerusalem, Israel	69.20.661
69	Israel Museum	Jerusalem, Israel	69.66.551
1199	Israel Museum	Jerusalem, Israel	69.96.549
319	Israel Museum	Jerusalem, Israel	71.8.12
791	Israel Museum	Jerusalem, Israel	71.46.80
1182	Israel Museum	Jerusalem, Israel	71.46.81
1127	Israel Museum	Jerusalem, Israel	71.46.82
970	Israel Museum	Jerusalem, Israel	71.46.83
1118	Israel Museum	Jerusalem, Israel	71.46.84
117	Israel Museum	Jerusalem, Israel	71.46.85
1083	Israel Museum	Jerusalem, Israel	71.46.86
1106	Israel Museum	Jerusalem, Israel	71.46.87
139	Israel Museum	Jerusalem, Israel	71.46.88
359	Israel Museum	Jerusalem, Israel	71.46.89
344	Israel Museum	Jerusalem, Israel	71.46.90
834	Israel Museum	Jerusalem, Israel	71.46.91
178	Israel Museum	Jerusalem, Israel	71.46.92
1061	Israel Museum	Jerusalem, Israel	71.46.93
784	Israel Museum	Jerusalem, Israel	71.46.94
965	Israel Museum	Jerusalem, Israel	71.46.95
874	Israel Museum	Jerusalem, Israel	71.46.96
33	Israel Museum	Jerusalem, Israel	71.46.97
742	Israel Museum	Jerusalem, Israel	71.46.98
280	Israel Museum	Jerusalem, Israel	71.46.99
924	Israel Museum	Jerusalem, Israel	71.46.100
877	Israel Museum	Jerusalem, Israel	71.46.101
846	Israel Museum	Jerusalem, Israel	71.46.102
229	Israel Museum	Jerusalem, Israel	71.46.103
1174	Israel Museum	Jerusalem, Israel	71.46.105
1010	Israel Museum	Jerusalem, Israel	71.46.106
62	Israel Museum	Jerusalem, Israel	71.46.107
1062	Israel Museum	Jerusalem, Israel	71.46.108
1007	Israel Museum	Jerusalem, Israel	71.65.177
13	Israel Museum	Jerusalem, Israel	71.66.360
381	Israel Museum	Jerusalem, Israel	71.70.220
241	Israel Museum	Jerusalem, Israel	73.19.2
1073	Israel Museum	Jerusalem, Israel	73.19.3
137	Israel Museum	Jerusalem, Israel	73.19.4
1043	Israel Museum	Jerusalem, Israel	73.19.5
314	Israel Museum	Jerusalem, Israel	73.19.6
158	Israel Museum	Jerusalem, Israel	73.19.7
141	Israel Museum	Jerusalem, Israel	73.19.8
156	Israel Museum	Jerusalem, Israel	73.19.9
92	Israel Museum	Jerusalem, Israel	73.19.10
235	Israel Museum	Jerusalem, Israel	73.19.11
300	Israel Museum	Jerusalem, Israel	73.19.12
245	Israel Museum	Jerusalem, Israel	73.19.13
201	Israel Museum	Jerusalem, Israel	73.19.14
138	Israel Museum	Jerusalem, Israel	73.19.15
110	Israel Museum	Jerusalem, Israel	73.19.16
93	Israel Museum	Jerusalem, Israel	73.19.17
384	Israel Museum	Jerusalem, Israel	73.19.21
1029	Israel Museum	Jerusalem, Israel	73.19.22
240	Israel Museum	Jerusalem, Israel	73.19.23
1132	Israel Museum	Jerusalem, Israel	73.19.25
794	Israel Museum	Jerusalem, Israel	73.19.26
99	Israel Museum	Jerusalem, Israel	73.19.27
951	Israel Museum	Jerusalem, Israel	73.19.28
379	Israel Museum	Jerusalem, Israel	73.19.29
291	Israel Museum	Jerusalem, Israel	73.19.30
140	Israel Museum	Jerusalem, Israel	73.19.31
87	Israel Museum	Jerusalem, Israel	73.19.32
36	Israel Museum	Jerusalem, Israel	73.19.33
922	Israel Museum	Jerusalem, Israel	73.19.34
714	Israel Museum	Jerusalem, Israel	73.19.35
438	Israel Museum	Jerusalem, Israel	73.19.37
475	Israel Museum	Jerusalem, Israel	73.19.38
939	Israel Museum	Jerusalem, Israel	73.19.39
989	Israel Museum	Jerusalem, Israel	73.19.40
822	Israel Museum	Jerusalem, Israel	73.19.41
1015	Israel Museum	Jerusalem, Israel	73.19.42
931	Israel Museum	Jerusalem, Israel	73.19.43
209	Israel Museum	Jerusalem, Israel	73.28.66
337	Israel Museum	Jerusalem, Israel	73.28.67
183	Israel Museum	Jerusalem, Israel	73.28.68
228	Israel Museum	Jerusalem, Israel	73.28.69
218	Israel Museum	Jerusalem, Israel	73.28.70
407	Israel Museum	Jerusalem, Israel	74.16.45
(875)	Israel Museum	Jerusalem, Israel	75.31 see Jerusalem, Reifenberg family
1017	Israel Museum	Jerusalem, Israel	75.47.145
281	Israel Museum	Jerusalem, Israel	76.7.36
969	Israel Museum	Jerusalem, Israel	76.7.37
107	Israel Museum	Jerusalem, Israel	76.7.38
627B	Israel Museum	Jerusalem, Israel	76.22
650	Israel Museum	Jerusalem, Israel	76.22
417A	Israel Museum	Jerusalem, Israel	76.22.2299
406	Israel Museum	Jerusalem, Israel	76.22.2300
413	Israel Museum	Jerusalem, Israel	76.22.2301
584A	Israel Museum	Jerusalem, Israel	76.22.2302
491A, B	Israel Museum	Jerusalem, Israel	76.22.2303-4
496	Israel Museum	Jerusalem, Israel	76.22.2305
615	Israel Museum	Jerusalem, Israel	76.22.2306
535A	Israel Museum	Jerusalem, Israel	76.22.2307
495	Israel Museum	Jerusalem, Israel	76.22.2308
614	Israel Museum	Jerusalem, Israel	76.22.2309
612B	Israel Museum	Jerusalem, Israel	76.22.2310
570	Israel Museum	Jerusalem, Israel	76.22.2311
540	Israel Museum	Jerusalem, Israel	76.22.2312
449A	Israel Museum	Jerusalem, Israel	76.22.2313
433	Israel Museum	Jerusalem, Israel	76.22.2314
483B	Israel Museum	Jerusalem, Israel	76.22.2315
632	Israel Museum	Jerusalem, Israel	76.22.2316
629A	Israel Museum	Jerusalem, Israel	76.22.2317
629D	Israel Museum	Jerusalem, Israel	76.22.2318
628	Israel Museum	Jerusalem, Israel	76.22.2319
435	Israel Museum	Jerusalem, Israel	76.22.2320
629C	Israel Museum	Jerusalem, Israel	76.22.2321
587	Israel Museum	Jerusalem, Israel	76.22.2322
549	Israel Museum	Jerusalem, Israel	76.22.2324
574	Israel Museum	Jerusalem, Israel	76.22.2325
506	Israel Museum	Jerusalem, Israel	76.22.2326
585	Israel Museum	Jerusalem, Israel	76.22.2327
619	Israel Museum	Jerusalem, Israel	76.22.2328
517	Israel Museum	Jerusalem, Israel	76.22.2329
554	Israel Museum	Jerusalem, Israel	76.22.2330
651	Israel Museum	Jerusalem, Israel	76.22.2331
454	Israel Museum	Jerusalem, Israel	76.22.2333
477A	Israel Museum	Jerusalem, Israel	76.22.2334
481C	Israel Museum	Jerusalem, Israel	76.22.2335
647	Israel Museum	Jerusalem, Israel	76.22.2336
465	Israel Museum	Jerusalem, Israel	76.22.2337 (top half)
423	Israel Museum	Jerusalem, Israel	76.22.2338 (right half)
627A	Israel Museum	Jerusalem, Israel	76.22.2339 (bottom half)
594B	Israel Museum	Jerusalem, Israel	76.22.2341
648	Israel Museum	Jerusalem, Israel	76.22.2342
468	Israel Museum	Jerusalem, Israel	76.22.2344 (left half)
101	Israel Museum	Jerusalem, Israel	77.7.966
217	Israel Museum	Jerusalem, Israel	77.7.967
30	Israel Museum	Jerusalem, Israel	80.16.57
499	Israel Museum	Jerusalem, Israel	80.44.252
607	Israel Museum	Jerusalem, Israel	80.44.253
883	Israel Museum	Jerusalem, Israel	82.39.967
861	Israel Museum	Jerusalem, Israel	85.15.17
205	Israel Museum	Jerusalem, Israel	85.15.18
391	Israel Museum	Jerusalem, Israel	85.15.19
29	Israel Museum	Jerusalem, Israel	85.15.20
1075	Israel Museum	Jerusalem, Israel	85.15.21
12	Israel Museum	Jerusalem, Israel	85.15.22
361	Israel Museum	Jerusalem, Israel	85.15.23
7	Israel Museum	Jerusalem, Israel	85.15.24
21	Israel Museum	Jerusalem, Israel	85.15.25
20	Israel Museum	Jerusalem, Israel	85.15.26
351	Israel Museum	Jerusalem, Israel	90.24.20
816	Israel Museum	Jerusalem, Israel	90.24.21
204	T. Kollek Collection	Jerusalem, Israel	IMJ accession 71.93
247	T. Kollek Collection	Jerusalem, Israel	-
955	Pontifical Biblical Institute	Rome, Italy	197
905	E. Puech(?)	Israel	-
46	Reifenberg Family	Israel	-
671	Reifenberg Family	Israel	-
875	Reifenberg Family	Israel	IMJ accession 75.31
1047	St. Anne Museum	Jerusalem, Israel	1417
402A	Y. Sasson Collection	Israel	-
403	Y. Sasson Collection	Israel	-
404A, B	Y. Sasson Collection	Israel	-
408	Y. Sasson Collection	Israel	-
409	Y. Sasson Collection	Israel	-
414	Y. Sasson Collection	Israel	-
415	Y. Sasson Collection	Israel	-
423	Y. Sasson Collection	Israel	left-hand half
426	Y. Sasson Collection	Israel	-
432	Y. Sasson Collection	Israel	-
434	Y. Sasson Collection	Israel	-
442	Y. Sasson Collection	Israel	-
444	Y. Sasson Collection	Israel	-
445A-C	Y. Sasson Collection	Israel	-
449B	Y. Sasson Collection	Israel	-
451	Y. Sasson Collection	Israel	-
453	Y. Sasson Collection	Israel	-
455	Y. Sasson Collection	Israel	-
456	Y. Sasson Collection	Israel	-
457	Y. Sasson Collection	Israel	-
460	Y. Sasson Collection	Israel	-
461	Y. Sasson Collection	Israel	-
462	Y. Sasson Collection	Israel	-
465	Y. Sasson Collection	Israel	bottom half
468	Y. Sasson Collection	Israel	right-hand half
471	Y. Sasson Collection	Israel	-
472	Y. Sasson Collection	Israel	-
477B	Y. Sasson Collection	Israel	-
478	Y. Sasson Collection	Israel	-
479	Y. Sasson Collection	Israel	-
480	Y. Sasson Collection	Israel	-
481A, B	Y. Sasson Collection	Israel	-
483A	Y. Sasson Collection	Israel	-
484	Y. Sasson Collection	Israel	-
485A, B	Y. Sasson Collection	Israel	-
486	Y. Sasson Collection	Israel	-
487	Y. Sasson Collection	Israel	-
488	Y. Sasson Collection	Israel	-
490A, B	Y. Sasson Collection	Israel	-
492	Y. Sasson Collection	Israel	-
493A-C	Y. Sasson Collection	Israel	-
497	Y. Sasson Collection	Israel	-
501	Y. Sasson Collection	Israel	-
502	Y. Sasson Collection	Israel	-
505	Y. Sasson Collection	Israel	-
507	Y. Sasson Collection	Israel	-
512A	Y. Sasson Collection	Israel	-
513	Y. Sasson Collection	Israel	-
514B	Y. Sasson Collection	Israel	-
519	Y. Sasson Collection	Israel	-
520	Y. Sasson Collection	Israel	-
521	Y. Sasson Collection	Israel	-
525A, B	Y. Sasson Collection	Israel	-
526A-C	Y. Sasson Collection	Israel	-
527	Y. Sasson Collection	Israel	-
528	Y. Sasson Collection	Israel	-
529	Y. Sasson Collection	Israel	-
531	Y. Sasson Collection	Israel	-
532	Y. Sasson Collection	Israel	-
533	Y. Sasson Collection	Israel	-
534	Y. Sasson Collection	Israel	-
537	Y. Sasson Collection	Israel	-
538	Y. Sasson Collection	Israel	-
539	Y. Sasson Collection	Israel	-
542	Y. Sasson Collection	Israel	-
543	Y. Sasson Collection	Israel	-
544	Y. Sasson Collection	Israel	-
545	Y. Sasson Collection	Israel	-
546	Y. Sasson Collection	Israel	-
547	Y. Sasson Collection	Israel	-
548	Y. Sasson Collection	Israel	-
550	Y. Sasson Collection	Israel	-
551	Y. Sasson Collection	Israel	-
552	Y. Sasson Collection	Israel	-
553	Y. Sasson Collection	Israel	-
555	Y. Sasson Collection	Israel	-
556	Y. Sasson Collection	Israel	-
557	Y. Sasson Collection	Israel	-
558	Y. Sasson Collection	Israel	-
560	Y. Sasson Collection	Israel	-
561	Y. Sasson Collection	Israel	-
562	Y. Sasson Collection	Israel	-
563	Y. Sasson Collection	Israel	-
564	Y. Sasson Collection	Israel	-
566	Y. Sasson Collection	Israel	-
567B	Y. Sasson Collection	Israel	-
569	Y. Sasson Collection	Israel	-
572	Y. Sasson Collection	Israel	-
575	Y. Sasson Collection	Israel	-
576	Y. Sasson Collection	Israel	-
578	Y. Sasson Collection	Israel	-
579B-I, K-N	Y. Sasson Collection	Israel	-
582	Y. Sasson Collection	Israel	-
589	Y. Sasson Collection	Israel	-
590	Y. Sasson Collection	Israel	-
591A, B	Y. Sasson Collection	Israel	-
592	Y. Sasson Collection	Israel	-
594A	Y. Sasson Collection	Israel	-
598	Y. Sasson Collection	Israel	-
600A, B	Y. Sasson Collection	Israel	-
601	Y. Sasson Collection	Israel	-
602	Y. Sasson Collection	Israel	-
603	Y. Sasson Collection	Israel	-
604	Y. Sasson Collection	Israel	-
608	Y. Sasson Collection	Israel	-
609	Y. Sasson Collection	Israel	-
610A, B	Y. Sasson Collection	Israel	-
611A, B	Y. Sasson Collection	Israel	-
612A	Y. Sasson Collection	Israel	-
617	Y. Sasson Collection	Israel	-
618	Y. Sasson Collection	Israel	-
620	Y. Sasson Collection	Israel	-
621	Y. Sasson Collection	Israel	-
622	Y. Sasson Collection	Israel	-
623	Y. Sasson Collection	Israel	-
624A, B	Y. Sasson Collection	Israel	-
627A	Y. Sasson Collection	Israel	top half
629B	Y. Sasson Collection	Israel	-
630	Y. Sasson Collection	Israel	-
633	Y. Sasson Collection	Israel	-
634	Y. Sasson Collection	Israel	-
635	Y. Sasson Collection	Israel	-
640	Y. Sasson Collection	Israel	-
641	Y. Sasson Collection	Israel	-
642	Y. Sasson Collection	Israel	-
645	Y. Sasson Collection	Israel	-
646	Y. Sasson Collection	Israel	-
649	Y. Sasson Collection	Israel	-
652	Y. Sasson Collection	Israel	-
653	Y. Sasson Collection	Israel	-
654	Y. Sasson Collection	Israel	-
655	Y. Sasson Collection	Israel	-
656	Y. Sasson Collection	Israel	-
657A, B	Y. Sasson Collection	Israel	-
142	Spaer	Israel	-
356	Spaer	Israel	-
362	Spaer	Israel	-
375	Spaer	Israel	-
386	Spaer	Israel	-
606	Spaer	Israel	-
693	Spaer	Israel	-
1009	Spaer	Israel	-
1162	Spaer	Israel	-
410	L. A. Wolfe Collection	Israel	-
559	L. A. Wolfe Collection	Israel	Exhibited at BLMJ, accession 846
579A	L. A. Wolfe Collection	Israel	Exhibited at BLMJ
580	L. A. Wolfe Collection	Israel	Exhibited at BLMJ, accession 850
238	Anonymous Private Collection	Israel	-
255	Anonymous Private Collection	Israel	-
324	Anonymous Private Collection	Israel	-
1172	Anonymous Private Collection	Israel	-
24	A. Brown Collection	Tel Aviv, Israel	-
95	A. Brown Collection	Tel Aviv, Israel	-
131	A. Brown Collection	Tel Aviv, Israel	-
145	A. Brown Collection	Tel Aviv, Israel	-
208	A. Brown Collection	Tel Aviv, Israel	-
230	A. Brown Collection	Tel Aviv, Israel	-
242	A. Brown Collection	Tel Aviv, Israel	-
341	A. Brown Collection	Tel Aviv, Israel	-
354	A. Brown Collection	Tel Aviv, Israel	-
368	A. Brown Collection	Tel Aviv, Israel	-
389	A. Brown Collection	Tel Aviv, Israel	-
841	A. Brown Collection	Tel Aviv, Israel	-
1031(?)	A. Brown Collection	Tel Aviv, Israel	-
1187	A. Brown Collection	Tel Aviv, Israel	-
1205	A. Brown Collection	Tel Aviv, Israel	-
116	Einhorn Collection	Tel Aviv, Israel	-
188	Einhorn Collection	Tel Aviv, Israel	-
358	Einhorn Collection	Tel Aviv, Israel	-
682A	Haaretz Museum	Tel Aviv, Israel	MHA 55
707C	Haaretz Museum	Tel Aviv, Israel	MHA 56
698D	Haaretz Museum	Tel Aviv, Israel	MHA 57
246	Haaretz Museum	Tel Aviv, Israel	MHG 169
1000	Haaretz Museum	Tel Aviv, Israel	K-54508
909	Haaretz Museum	Tel Aviv, Israel	K-54512
949	Haaretz Museum	Tel Aviv, Israel	K-54515
305	Haaretz Museum	Tel Aviv, Israel	K-54518
149	Haaretz Museum	Tel Aviv, Israel	K-54523
345	Haaretz Museum	Tel Aviv, Israel	K-54541
732	Haaretz Museum	Tel Aviv, Israel	K-54569
402B	Haaretz Museum	Tel Aviv, Israel	K-71958
658	Haaretz Museum	Tel Aviv, Israel	K-551.90
1206	Haya Kaplan	Tel Aviv, Israel	
661	Tel Aviv University, Institute of Archaeology	Tel Aviv, Israel	Beersheba expedition
707E	Tel Aviv University, Institute of Archaeology	Tel Aviv, Israel	Lachish expedition
745	Museo Archeologico Nazionale	Cagliari, Italy	9450
1122	Museo Archeologico	Florence, Italy	-
733	Biggio Collection	Sant'Antioco, Italy	-
916	Archaeological Museum	Amman, Jordan	J.252 (formerly PAM 41.889)
859	Archaeological Museum	Amman, Jordan	J.1191
973	Archaeological Museum	Amman, Jordan	J.1195
944	Archaeological Museum	Amman, Jordan	J.1200
964	Archaeological Museum	Amman, Jordan	J.1920
1051C	Archaeological Museum	Amman, Jordan	J.2806
1051D	Archaeological Museum	Amman, Jordan	J.2862
1051A, B	Archaeological Museum	Amman, Jordan	J.2866
1052(?)	Archaeological Museum	Amman, Jordan	J.5192
963	Archaeological Museum	Amman, Jordan	J.12938
988	Archaeological Museum	Amman, Jordan	J.13727
1011	Archaeological Museum	Amman, Jordan	J.14653
220	Archaeological Museum	Amman, Jordan	-
224	Archaeological Museum	Amman, Jordan	-
707F(?)	Archaeological Museum	Amman, Jordan	-
757(?)	Archaeological Museum	Amman, Jordan	-
860(?)	Archaeological Museum	Amman, Jordan	-
886(?)	Archaeological Museum	Amman, Jordan	-
977(?)	Archaeological Museum	Amman, Jordan	-
1049(?)	Archaeological Museum	Amman, Jordan	-
1050(?)	Archaeological Museum	Amman, Jordan	-
1109	Jordan University	Jordan	164
872	Jordan University	Jordan	165
727(?)	Beirut Museum	Lebanon	-
990(?)	Beirut Museum	Lebanon	-
267	Museo Arqueologico Nacional	Madrid, Spain	85/27/1
1038	Museo Biblico	Palma de Mallorca, Spain	230.108
1144	Biblical Institute of the University	Fribourg, Switzerland	-
1168	Biblical Institute of the University	Fribourg, Switzerland	-
206	Biblical Institute of the University	Fribourg, Switzerland	On loan from el-Aaji, Zurich (Aug 1996)
1088	Musée d'Art et d'Histoire	Geneva, Switzerland	1950/19216
1095	Musée d'Art et d'Histoire	Geneva, Switzerland	1950/19218
882	el-Aaji Collection	Zurich, Switzerland	-
185	Carthage National Museum	Tunisia	-
809	Rijksmuseum, Royal Coin Cabinet	Leiden, Netherlands	Gesneden Steenen 1297
10	University of Oslo	Oslo, Norway	-
31	University of Oslo	Oslo, Norway	-
248	University of Oslo	Oslo, Norway	-
954	University of Oslo	Oslo, Norway	-
1014	University of Oslo	Oslo, Norway	-
798	Pushkin Museum	Moscow, Russia	NI 2B255
364	Pushkin Museum	Moscow, Russia	-
813	Hermitage Museum	St. Petersburg, Russia	6434
210	Archaeological Museum	Istanbul, Turkey	1302
85	Archaeological Museum	Istanbul, Turkey	2498
691A	Archaeological Museum	Istanbul, Turkey	3620
667B	Archaeological Museum	Istanbul, Turkey	3625
1178	Oriental Museum	Durham, UK	N 2307
1040	Dr Joseph Bard Collection	London, UK	-
1076	British Museum	London, UK	48486
143	British Museum	London, UK	48487
1179	British Museum	London, UK	48488
1169	British Museum	London, UK	48489
937	British Museum	London, UK	48490
1104	British Museum	London, UK	48491
193	British Museum	London, UK	48492
316	British Museum	London, UK	48494
829	British Museum	London, UK	48495
751	British Museum	London, UK	48497
1022	British Museum	London, UK	48499
821	British Museum	London, UK	48500
1046	British Museum	London, UK	48501
1066	British Museum	London, UK	48502
265	British Museum	London, UK	48503
871	British Museum	London, UK	48504
1042	British Museum	London, UK	48505
1094	British Museum	London, UK	48506
719	British Museum	London, UK	48507
754	British Museum	London, UK	48508
796	British Museum	London, UK	84540-7, 84575, 84833
837	British Museum	London, UK	84540-7, 84575, 84833
807	British Museum	London, UK	102967
722	British Museum	London, UK	102968
802	British Museum	London, UK	102969
1105	British Museum	London, UK	102970
853	British Museum	London, UK	102971
357	British Museum	London, UK	102972
910	British Museum	London, UK	102973
1081	British Museum	London, UK	102974
34	British Museum	London, UK	113200
1034	British Museum	London, UK	116598
730	British Museum	London, UK	117908
1130	British Museum	London, UK	117919
975	British Museum	London, UK	123006
(210)	British Museum	London, UK	125680 (replica; original in Istanbul)
1125	British Museum	London, UK	126388
1090	British Museum	London, UK	130667
679C	British Museum	London, UK	132066
684E	British Museum	London, UK	132070
504	British Museum	London, UK	134695
731	British Museum	London, UK	134887
1053	British Museum	London, UK	136202
350	British Museum	London, UK	160028
679B	British Museum	London, UK	160141
360	British Museum	London, UK	-
667F	British Museum	London, UK	-
675A	British Museum	London, UK	-
678A	British Museum	London, UK	-
684C	British Museum	London, UK	-
689A	British Museum	London, UK	-
706A, B(?)	British Museum	London, UK	-
707A	British Museum	London, UK	-
707B	British Museum	London, UK	-
(774)	British Museum	London, UK	Replica (location of original not reported)
1057	British Museum	London, UK	-
667G	Fitzwilliam Museum	Cambridge, UK	61.D.155 B(18)
675B	Fitzwilliam Museum	Cambridge, UK	61.D.155 B(18)
678B	Fitzwilliam Museum	Cambridge, UK	61.D.155 B(19)
678C	Fitzwilliam Museum	Cambridge, UK	61.D.155 B(18)
678D	Fitzwilliam Museum	Cambridge, UK	61.D.155 B(18)
679F	Fitzwilliam Museum	Cambridge, UK	61.D.155 B(18)
684D	Fitzwilliam Museum	Cambridge, UK	61.D.155 B(18)
684F	Fitzwilliam Museum	Cambridge, UK	61.D.155 B(18)
689B	Fitzwilliam Museum	Cambridge, UK	61.D.155 B(18)
690	Fitzwilliam Museum	Cambridge, UK	61.D.155 B(18)
698C	Fitzwilliam Museum	Cambridge, UK	61.D.155 B(18)
704A	Fitzwilliam Museum	Cambridge, UK	61.D.155 B(18)
1028	Ashmolean Museum	Oxford, UK	1889.408
104	Ashmolean Museum	Oxford, UK	1889.409
203	Ashmolean Museum	Oxford, UK	1889.433
1085	Ashmolean Museum	Oxford, UK	1889.984
1111	Ashmolean Museum	Oxford, UK	1890.117
1138	Ashmolean Museum	Oxford, UK	1895.98
1149	Ashmolean Museum	Oxford, UK	1914.57
135	Ashmolean Museum	Oxford, UK	1921.1221
250	Ashmolean Museum	Oxford, UK	1943.2
783	Ashmolean Museum	Oxford, UK	1966.1228
37	Ashmolean Museum	Oxford, UK	Gibson loan
1154	City Council Museum & Art Gallery	Birmingham, UK	1957A82
15	S. Moussaieff Collection		-
18	S. Moussaieff Collection		-
68	S. Moussaieff Collection		-
106	S. Moussaieff Collection		-
174	S. Moussaieff Collection		-
191	S. Moussaieff Collection		-
199	S. Moussaieff Collection		-
214	S. Moussaieff Collection		-
221	S. Moussaieff Collection		-
273	S. Moussaieff Collection		-
275	S. Moussaieff Collection		-
282	S. Moussaieff Collection		-
307	S. Moussaieff Collection		-
310	S. Moussaieff Collection		-
320	S. Moussaieff Collection		-
322	S. Moussaieff Collection		-
323	S. Moussaieff Collection		-
355	S. Moussaieff Collection		-
397	S. Moussaieff Collection		-
398	S. Moussaieff Collection		-
417B	S. Moussaieff Collection		-
418	S. Moussaieff Collection		-
512C	S. Moussaieff Collection		-
725	S. Moussaieff Collection		-
770	S. Moussaieff Collection		-
827	S. Moussaieff Collection		-
851	S. Moussaieff Collection		-
864	S. Moussaieff Collection		-
879	S. Moussaieff Collection		-
894	S. Moussaieff Collection		-
900	S. Moussaieff Collection		-
902	S. Moussaieff Collection		-
912	S. Moussaieff Collection		-
936	S. Moussaieff Collection		-
947	S. Moussaieff Collection		-
957	S. Moussaieff Collection		-
976	S. Moussaieff Collection		-
1006	S. Moussaieff Collection		-
1008	S. Moussaieff Collection		-
1012	S. Moussaieff Collection		-
1013	S. Moussaieff Collection		-
1077	S. Moussaieff Collection		-
1167	S. Moussaieff Collection		-
1186	S. Moussaieff Collection		-
1195	S. Moussaieff Collection		-
1208	S. Moussaieff Collection		-
150	Palestine Exploration Fund		
695A	Palestine Exploration Fund		
308	Petrie Museum		23004
51	Petrie Museum		36112
1157	Petrie Museum		36113
665A	Badè Museum	Berkeley, USA	-
701C	Badè Museum	Berkeley, USA	-
800	Badè Museum	Berkeley, USA	-
835	Museum of Fine Arts	Boston, USA	65.1584
6	Museum of Fine Arts	Boston, USA	69.1189
27	Harvard Semitic Museum	Cambridge, USA	-
163	Harvard Semitic Museum	Cambridge, USA	-
884	Harvard Semitic Museum	Cambridge, USA	-
1051G-V	Harvard Semitic Museum	Cambridge, USA	-
755	Oriental Institute	Chicago, USA	A7036
1124	Oriental Institute	Chicago, USA	A18973
5	Babylonian Collection	New Haven, USA	NCBS 883
933	Babylonian Collection	New Haven, USA	NCBS 885
278	Babylonian Collection	New Haven, USA	YBC 9115
1051E	Smithsonian Institution	Washington, USA	NMNH Anthro 388245
1051F	Smithsonian Institution	Washington, USA	NMNH Anthro 388192
1054	Smithsonian Institution	Washington, USA	NMNH Anthro 388291
41	Los Angeles, Strauss collection		-
1159	American Numismatic Society		(no number)
679H	Jewish Museum		12-73.280
701E	Jewish Museum		12-73.286
845	Metropolitan Museum of Art		86.11.29
995	Pierpont Morgan Library		284
869	J. Rosen collection		5229
836	J. Rosen collection		5230
812	J. Rosen collection		Gem collection 435
968	J. Rosen collection		Gem collection 436
1056	J. Rosen collection		Gem collection 438
226	J. Rosen collection		-
786	J. Rosen collection		-
1096	J. Rosen collection		-
84	M. Steinhardt collection		-
815	Philadelphia University Museum		B 12849
681A	Philadelphia University Museum		60-13-129
708C	Philadelphia University Museum		60-13-130
680A	Philadelphia University Museum		60-13-131
680B	Philadelphia University Museum		60-13-132
678F	Philadelphia University Museum		60-13-133
708B	Philadelphia University Museum		61-14-1173
674A	Philadelphia University Museum		61-14-1174
694	Philadelphia University Museum		61-14-1175
674B	Philadelphia University Museum		61-14-1176
699A	Philadelphia University Museum		-
663B	Pittsburgh, Bible Lands Museum		-
811	Cairo, formerly AimÃ©-Giron collection		-
923	Cairo, formerly AimÃ©-Giron collection		-
54	Paris, formerly Altman collection		-
61	Paris, formerly Altman collection		-
64	Paris, formerly Altman collection		-
65	Paris, formerly Altman collection		-
66	Paris, formerly Altman collection		-
75	Paris, formerly Altman collection		-
82(?)	Paris, formerly Altman collection		-
83	Paris, formerly Altman collection		-
89	Paris, formerly Altman collection		-
98	Paris, formerly Altman collection		-
134	Paris, formerly Altman collection		-
153	Paris, formerly Altman collection		-
171	Paris, formerly Altman collection		-
189	Paris, formerly Altman collection		-
195	Paris, formerly Altman collection		-
202	Paris, formerly Altman collection		-
216	Paris, formerly Altman collection		-
231	Paris, formerly Altman collection		-
232	Paris, formerly Altman collection		-
237	Paris, formerly Altman collection		-
243	Paris, formerly Altman collection		-
244	Paris, formerly Altman collection		-
251	Paris, formerly Altman collection		-
253	Paris, formerly Altman collection		-
256	Paris, formerly Altman collection		-
272	Paris, formerly Altman collection		-
274	Paris, formerly Altman collection		-
276	Paris, formerly Altman collection		-
283	Paris, formerly Altman collection		-
286	Paris, formerly Altman collection		-
296	Paris, formerly Altman collection		-
304	Paris, formerly Altman collection		-
309	Paris, formerly Altman collection		-
315	Paris, formerly Altman collection		-
339	Paris, formerly Altman collection		-
365	Paris, formerly Altman collection		-
367	Paris, formerly Altman collection		-
373	Paris, formerly Altman collection		-
376	Paris, formerly Altman collection		-
380	Paris, formerly Altman collection		-
393	Paris, formerly Altman collection		-
616	Paris, formerly Altman collection		-
718	Paris, formerly Altman collection		-
766	Paris, formerly Altman collection		-
781	Paris, formerly Altman collection		-
787	Paris, formerly Altman collection		-
844	Paris, formerly Altman collection		-
896	Paris, formerly Altman collection		-
897	Paris, formerly Altman collection		-
904	Paris, formerly Altman collection		
915	Paris, formerly Altman collection		
920	Paris, formerly Altman collection		
945	Paris, formerly Altman collection		
948	Paris, formerly Altman collection		
956	Paris, formerly Altman collection		
967	Paris, formerly Altman collection		
982	Paris, formerly Altman collection		
984	Paris, formerly Altman collection		
986	Paris, formerly Altman collection		
994	Paris, formerly Altman collection		
998	Paris, formerly Altman collection		
999	Paris, formerly Altman collection		
1004	Paris, formerly Altman collection		
1026	Paris, formerly Altman collection		
1045	Paris, formerly Altman collection		
1188	Paris, formerly Altman collection		
1189	Paris, formerly Altman collection		
1200	Paris, formerly Altman collection		
1134	Formerly Blanchet	-	
1135	Formerly Blanchet	-	
724	Formerly de Rougé	-	
1158	Formerly Soufre de Stoch	-	
374	Formerly de Vogüé	-	
721	Formerly de Vogüé	-	
839	Formerly de Vogüé	-	
1176	Formerly de Vogüé	-	
885	Formerly Brünnow	-	
334	Formerly W. von Landau	-	
175	Barakat Gallery (formerly?)	Beverly Hills, USA	-
625	Barakat Gallery (formerly?)	Beverly Hills, USA	-
873	Barakat Gallery (formerly?)	Beverly Hills, USA	-
891	Barakat Gallery (formerly?)	Beverly Hills, USA	-
899	Barakat Gallery (formerly?)	Beverly Hills, USA	-
913	Barakat Gallery (formerly?)	Beverly Hills, USA	-
941	Barakat Gallery (formerly?)	Beverly Hills, USA	-
960	Barakat Gallery (formerly?)	Beverly Hills, USA	-
981	Barakat Gallery (formerly?)	Beverly Hills, USA	-
1016	Barakat Gallery (formerly?)	Beverly Hills, USA	-
1030	Barakat Gallery (formerly?)	Beverly Hills, USA	-
1171	Barakat Gallery (formerly?)	Beverly Hills, USA	-
1183	Barakat Gallery (formerly?)	Beverly Hills, USA	-
1197	Barakat Gallery (formerly?)	Beverly Hills, USA	-
313	Formerly D.J. Content	New York, USA	-
1121	Formerly D.J. Content	New York, USA	-
1072	Formerly E.T. Newell	New York, USA	-
858	Formerly Dropsie College	Philadelphia, USA	-
25	Anonymous private collection	Haifa (?)	-
277	Anonymous private collection	USA	-
295	Anonymous private collection	California, USA	-
400	Private collection outside Israel	-	-
419	Private collection outside Israel	-	-
422	Private collection outside Israel	-	-
431	Private collection outside Israel	-	-
567A	Private collection outside Israel	-	-
583	Private collection outside Israel	-	-
712	Private collection	Switzerland	-
771	Private collection	Switzerland	-
830	Formerly(?) private collection	Beirut	-
2	See Israel Antiquities Authority cast 230	-	
16	-	-	
428	Was Bethlehem, Kando	-	
760	Copenhagen? Aleppo?	-	
762	Copenhagen? Aleppo?	-	
769	Formerly(?) private collection in Lebanon	-	
774	British Museum replica (no number)	-	
1108	Formerly(?) George Moujabber collection	Jerusalem or Amman (?)	
863	Formerly private collection	Jerusalem	
1068	UK?	-	

== See also ==
- Ancient Near Eastern seals and sealing practices

== Bibliography ==
- Avigad, Nahman; Sass, Benjamin (1997). Corpus of West Semitic Stamp Seals. Jerusalem: Israel Academy of Sciences and Humanities / Israel Exploration Society.
- Hackett, Jo Ann; Aufrecht, Walter E. (2014-06-06). An Eye for Form": Epigraphic Essays in Honor of Frank Moore Cross. Penn State Press. ISBN 978-1-57506-887-9.
- Levy, Moritz Abraham (1869). Siegel und Gemmen mit aramäischen, phönizischen, althebräischen, himjarischen, nabathäischen und altsyrischen Inschriften (in German). Schletter.
- Vogüé, Melchior de (1868). "Intailles à légendes sémitiques". Mélanges d'archéologie orientale (in French). Impr. impériale. p. 105-140.
- Clermont-Ganneau, Charles Simon (1883). "Sceaux et cachets israélites, phéniciens et syriens". Journal Asiatique. 8 (in French). 1: 123–159, 304–310.
- Diringer, David (1934). Le iscrizioni antico-ebraiche palestinesi (in Italian). Florence: F. Le Monnier.
- Bordreuil, Pierre (2014). "On the Authenticity of Iron Age Northwest Semitic Inscribed Seals". In Hackett, Jo Ann; Aufrecht, Walter E. (eds.). An Eye for Form: Epigraphic Essays in Honor of Frank Moore Cross. Winona Lake, Indiana: Eisenbrauns. pp. 127–140.
- Schmitz, Philip C. (2014). "Phoenician Seal Script". In Hackett, Jo Ann; Aufrecht, Walter E. (eds.). An Eye for Form: Epigraphic Essays in Honor of Frank Moore Cross. Winona Lake, Indiana: Eisenbrauns. pp. 141–174.
- Herr, Larry G. (2014). "Aramaic and Ammonite Seal Scripts". In Hackett, Jo Ann; Aufrecht, Walter E. (eds.). An Eye for Form: Epigraphic Essays in Honor of Frank Moore Cross. Winona Lake, Indiana: Eisenbrauns. pp. 175–186.
- Herr, Larry G. (2014). "Hebrew, Moabite, and Edomite Seal Scripts". In Hackett, Jo Ann; Aufrecht, Walter E. (eds.). An Eye for Form: Epigraphic Essays in Honor of Frank Moore Cross. Winona Lake, Indiana: Eisenbrauns. pp. 187–201.
- Lidzbarski, Mark (1902). "Über einige Siegel mit semitischen Inschriften". Ephemeris für semitische Epigraphik. Vol. 1. De Gruyter. p. 136-142. doi:10.1515/9783111588438-019. ISBN 978-3-11-158843-8.
- Lidzbarski, Mark (1902). "Semitische Legenden auf Siegeln und Gewichten". Ephemeris für semitische Epigraphik. Vol. 1. De Gruyter. p. 271-280. doi:10.1515/9783111588438-019. ISBN 978-3-11-158843-8.
- Lidzbarski, Mark (1907). "Hebräische Inschrifte". Ephemeris für semitische Epigraphik. Vol. 2. De Gruyter. p. 70-72. doi:10.1515/9783111588438-019. ISBN 978-3-11-158843-8.
- Lidzbarski, Mark (1907). "Über einige Siegel und Gewichte mit semitischen Legenden". Ephemeris für semitische Epigraphik. Vol. 2. De Gruyter. p. 142-149. doi:10.1515/9783111588438-019. ISBN 978-3-11-158843-8.
