= Shema seal =

Ancient jasper seal

Shema Seal
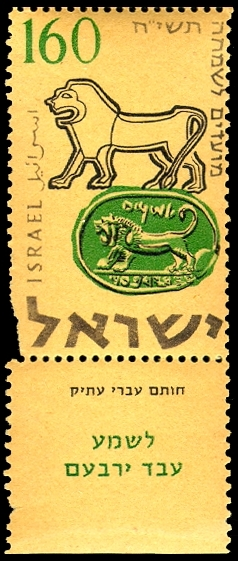
- Postage stamp depicting the Shema Seal
- Material: (Original) Jasper (Bulla) Clay
- Writing: Paleo Hebrew
- Created: 8th century BCE
- Discovered: (Original) 1904, Megiddo, Israel (Bulla) bought from a Bedouin market in 1980
- Present location: (Original) unknown (Bulla) Rockefeller Museum, Jerusalem

The Shema Seal is an ancient jasper seal that dates to the 8th century BC and mentions the ancient Jeroboam, king of the Kingdom of Israel.

Written in the paleo-Hebrew alphabet, it is part of a larger group of artifacts known as Canaanite and Aramaic seal inscriptions. It is known as WSS 2 and KI 4k.

== Discovery ==
Archaeologist Gottlieb Schumacher and his team began excavating at Megiddo and found the seal during a three-year excavation program. The seal was discovered in 1904, in an excavation dump. The layers in which it was found were dated to the eighth century BCE. Schumacher sent the original seal to Istanbul, but it was never returned. In 1966 Gottlieb's daughter gave a testimonial that her father told her that the seal was placed in Abdul Hamid II's tomb. A bronze cast was made before it was sent away.

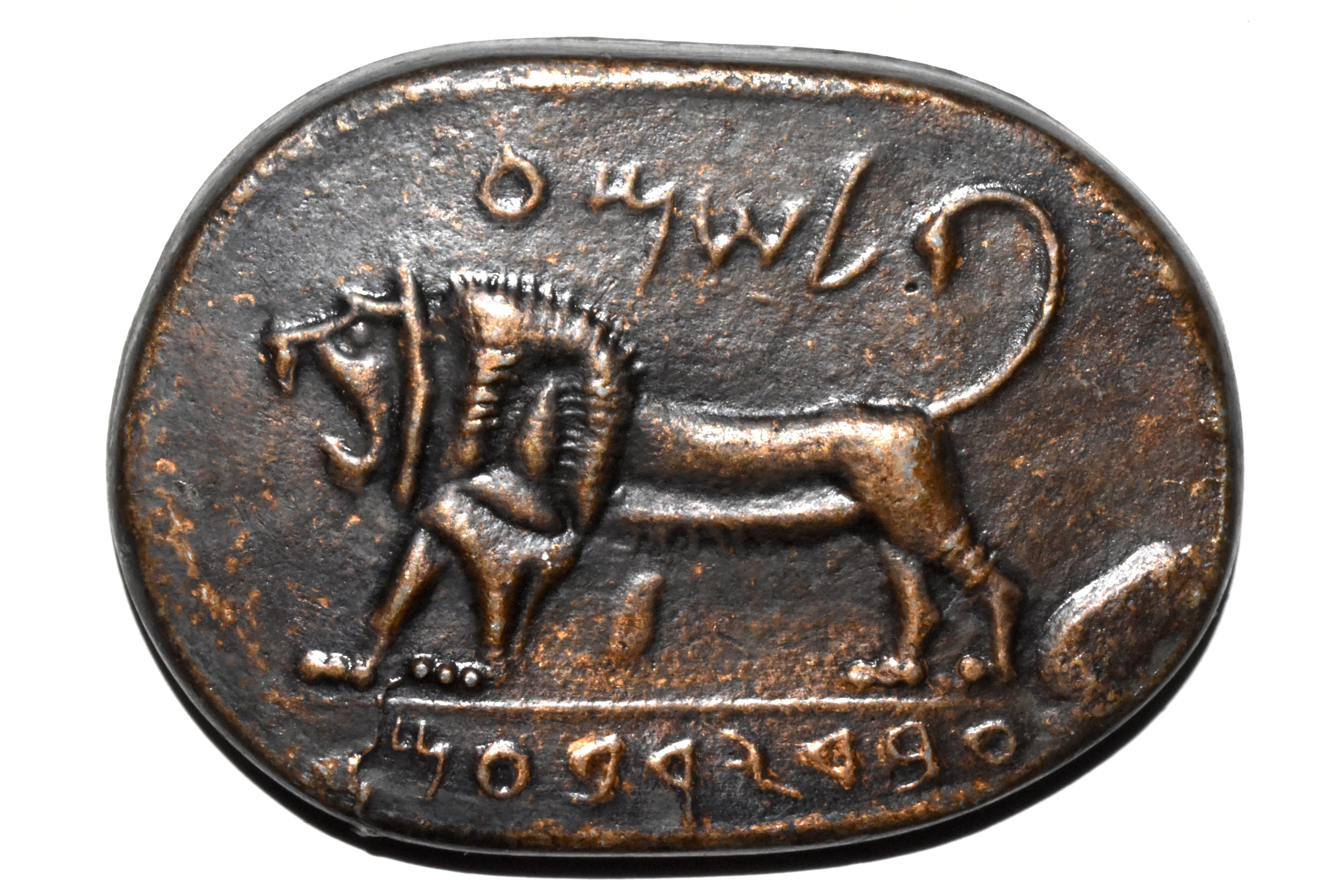
A cast bronze replica of the Shema Seal.

== Reputed Shema Bulla ==
The Shema bulla is a scaled down version of the Meggido seal. The bulla's owner claimed to have bought it in the 1980s in Bedouin market in Be'er Sheva for 10 shekels. However, the owner's account was refuted by noted antiquities expert and trader Robert Deutsch, who provided evidence for the purchase of the bulla, along with a group of other fake bullas, from a known Jerusalem antiquities trader in Jerusalem. Deutsch went on to provide evidence for the bulla's forgery.

== Text ==
“Belonging to Shema (שמע) the servant of Jeroboam.”

לשמע עבדירבעם

lshmˁ ˁbd yrbˁm

== See also ==
- List of inscriptions in biblical archaeology
- Kingdom of Israel (Samaria)
- Beersheba Settlement
- Governor of Jerusalem Seal
- Isaiah bulla
- King Hezekiah bulla
- King Ahaz's seal
- Yeho'ezer ben Hosh'ayahu seal
