= Isaiah bulla =

Hebrew-inscribed bulla found in Jerusalem

Isaiah seal
- Type: Bulla (inscribed seal impression)
- Material: Clay
- Writing: Hebrew (Paleo-Hebrew script)
- Created: 750–675 BCE
- Discovered: 2009; Ophel, Jerusalem
- Discovered by: Eilat Mazar
- Culture: Ancient Israel and Judah

The Isaiah bulla, or the Yešaʿyah[û] Bulla, is a Hebrew-inscribed bulla (clay seal impression) discovered in the Ophel area of ancient Jerusalem and dated to the Iron Age IIB, or more specifically, the late 8th or early 7th century BCE. The inscription, written in the Paleo-Hebrew alphabet, includes the word "le-Yešaʿyah[û]" ("Belonging to Isaiah"), and then, the letters "nby," which was reconstructed by the original excavator as "prophet", though the reading remains debated.

The bulla was recovered in 2009 during excavations directed by Eilat Mazar at the City of David. It is part of a larger group of artifacts known as Northwest Semitic seal inscriptions. Although not identified in situ, it was later recognized during the wet-sieving of excavation debris at Emek Tzurim. The bulla was found in close proximity to a bulla bearing the name of Hezekiah, king of Judah (r. late 8th century BCE).

Mazar has proposed that the inscription may refer to the biblical prophet Isaiah (Yešaʿyahû), who, according to the Hebrew Bible, was active during the reign of Hezekiah. This identification, however, has been contested by several philologists. Among them, Christopher Rollston has noted that the personal name Isaiah and its variants were common in ancient Israel and Judah, and that the surviving letters on the third register do not conclusively demonstrate the title "prophet." He suggests that the bulla may instead have belonged to a different person named Isaiah, possibly "Isaiah the Nobite", "Isaiah son of Nby" or another similarly named individual.

== Discovery ==
The Isaiah bulla was discovered in 2009 during excavations in the Ophel area of Jerusalem, immediately south of the Temple Mount. The excavations were directed by Eilat Mazar of the Hebrew University of Jerusalem. The seal impression was not identified during the fieldwork itself but was recognized at a later stage in the course of wet-sieving excavated material. The wet-sieving was conducted at the Emek Tzurim National Park in a sifting installation managed by Gabriel Barkay and Tzachi Dvira, under the auspices of the Israel Nature and Parks Authority and the Ir David Foundation.

The bulla was first published by Mazar in February 2018 in the magazine Biblical Archaeology Review, and later that year in an official excavation report.

== Description ==
The bulla is dated on palaeographic grounds to Iron Age IIB, more specifically to 750–675 BCE. Its inscription is arranged in three registers (lines), though only part of the text has survived due to the fragmentary condition of the seal impression.

The upper (first) register is largely lost; no complete letters are preserved, although traces of an iconographic motif are visible on the right side. The second register contains the sequence Lyšʿyh, representing the personal name Yešaʿyah (Isaiah) preceded by the letter lamedh (l-), which functions as a prepositional marker of possession: "Belonging to Yešaʿyah". It is generally assumed that the name was originally written with a final waw, Yešaʿyahû, a spelling consistent with Judahite theophoric practice, in which the divine name Yahweh is typically represented by the element yhw (pronounced yahu) at the end of personal names. The third register preserves the letters Nby.

== Identification ==
Eilat Mazar, the excavator of the Ophel site, proposed that the bulla may have belonged to the biblical prophet Isaiah. She wrote that that the seal impression was discovered in close proximity to a bulla bearing the name of Hezekiah, king of Judah, a monarch with whom Isaiah is closely associated in the Hebrew Bible. On this basis, she suggested that the inscription "Le-Yešaʿyah[û] nby" could plausibly be read as "Belonging to Isaiah [the] prophet."

This identification has been challenged by the philologist Christopher Rollston. Rollston holds that the name Yešaʿyahû (Isaiah) and its variants were common in ancient Israel and Judah. The root yšʿ was especially productive in the formation of personal names in the region, as reflected in biblical and epigraphic sources (e.g., Hoshea, Yehoshua, Yeshua, Yishai, Mesha, and Isaiah). In the absence of a patronymic (customarily included on Hebrew bullae of the period), he argues that it is difficult to identify the seal with the biblical prophet, whom the Bible describes as "Isaiah son of Amoz." Without such a patronymic, the bulla could just as plausibly have belonged to another individual of the same name living in Jerusalem in the late 8th or early 7th century BCE.

Rollston further questions the restoration of the word nby as nbyʾ (pronounced navi, "prophet"). He suggests that the final letter is incomplete and could be reconstructed not only as an aleph but also as a taw, teth, or lamedh, yielding a personal name (e.g., Nbyt), all paralleled in either biblical or broader Semitic onomastics. Alternatively, he suggests that Nby may already be complete as written. The sequence is attested as a personal name on another bulla from Lachish, and it could also function as a gentilic referring to someone associated with the city of Nob, or "Nobite".

According to Rollston, Mazar's reconstruction also encounters linguistic difficulties. First, in both biblical usage and Hebrew epigraphy, the title "prophet" when applied to a specific individual frequently appears with the definite article (ha-), which is absent here, weakening the case for reading the term as an official title. Second, Mazar's interpretation presumes that the yodh in nby serves as an internal mater lectionis (vowel letter) marking the vowel i; however, such internal vowel letters are rare in 8th-century BCE Hebrew inscriptions. Even in the later Lachish letters (c. 590 BCE), the word "prophet" appears without a yodh (spelled nbʾ). On these grounds, Rollston concludes that the most plausible reading is "Yešaʿyah[û] son of Nby," referring to an otherwise unknown individual rather than the biblical prophet.

By contrast, William Schniedewind has defended Mazar's proposal that the bulla refers to the biblical prophet. Schniedewind notes that the name Isaiah was in fact uncommon in the late 8th century BCE. He also holds that the word nby was an acceptable spelling for the title "prophet" in Iron Age Judah, based on its probable etymological derivation from Aramaic and comparative inscriptional evidence from Lachish. Finally, Schniedewind argues that the omission of the Hebrew word bn ("son of") before nby indicates that nby was intended as a title (prophet) rather than a patronymic.

== See also ==
- List of inscriptions in biblical archaeology
- King Hezekiah bulla
- King Ahaz's seal
- Shema seal
- Yeho'ezer ben Hosh'ayahu seal

== Bibliography ==
- Mazar, Eilat (2018). "Is This the Prophet Isaiah's Signature?". Biblical Archaeology Review. 44 (2): 64–73, 92.
- Mazar, Eilat; Ben-Arie, Reut Livyatan (2018). "Hebrew Seal Impressions (bullae) from the Ophel, Area A2009". In Mazar, Eilat (ed.). The Ophel Excavations to the South of the Temple Mount 2009-2013: Final Reports. Vol. 2. Jerusalem: Shoham Academic Research and Publication. pp. 247–279. ISBN 978-965-7726-02-0.
- Rollston, Christopher (2022). "The Yešaʿyah[û] ("Isaiah") Bulla and the Putative Connection with the Biblical Prophet: A Case Study in Propospography and the Necessity of Methodological Caution". In Rollston, Christopher; Garfein, Susanna; Walls, Neal H. (eds.). Biblical and Ancient Near Eastern Studies in Honor of P. Kyle McCarter Jr (PDF). SBL Press. pp. 409–426. ISBN 978-0-88414-515-8.
- Schniedewind, William (2023). "The Isaiah Bulla, Jeremiah Priest/Prophet, and Reinterpreting the Prophet in the Persian Scribal Community". In Fishbane, Eitan P.; Russ-Fishbane, Elisha (eds.). Jewish Culture and Creativity: Essays in Honor of Professor Michael Fishbane on the Occasion of His Eightieth Birthday. Academic Studies Press. pp. 36–52. ISBN 979-8-88719-306-9.
