= Byblos clay cone inscriptions =

Phoenician inscriptions

- Material: Clay
- Created: c. 1050 BC
- Discovered: c. 1950; Byblos, Keserwan-Jbeil, Lebanon
- Present location: Beirut, Beirut Governorate, Lebanon

The Byblos clay cones inscriptions are Phoenician inscriptions (TSSI III 2,3) on two clay cones discovered around 1950.

They were first published in Maurice Dunand's Fouilles de Byblos (volume II, 1954), but it was only twenty years later that their extremely old age was fully realized: they are now dated to the eleventh century BCE.

They are currently at the National Museum of Beirut.

== Text of the inscriptions ==
The two inscriptions are property marks. Both begin with a letter "L", i.e., the preposition la or li, meaning "(property) of", "(belonging) to". One inscription reads:

L‘BDḤMN

belonging to ‘Abd-Ḥammōn

The name Abd-Ḥammōn (literally, "servant of [the god Ba‘al]-Ḥammon") was quite common; in later times it is found in Greek letter inscriptions as Abdimon (Αβδημων, Αβδημουν, or Αβδυμων).

The other inscription reads:

L’Ḥ’ŠBBD (or L’Ḥ’MBBD)

belonging to ’Aḥī’aš (or ’Aḥī’am), son of Bōdī

In the name ’Aḥī’aš/m the first part, aḥi-, is very common, its meaning is brother of ..., or my brother is ... The name Bōdī or Bōdō is also well documented (the element BD’- in proper names = in the hand of, in the service of [a god], Hebrew b^{e}yad-).

== Bibliography ==
- Christopher Rollston, "The Dating of the Early Royal Byblian Phoenician Inscriptions: A Response to Benjamin Sass." MAARAV 15 (2008): 57–93.
- Benjamin Mazar, The Phoenician Inscriptions from Byblos and the Evolution of the Phoenician-Hebrew Alphabet, in The Early Biblical Period: Historical Studies (S. Ahituv and B. A. Levine, eds., Jerusalem: IES, 1986 [original publication: 1946]): 231–247.
- William F. Albright, The Phoenician Inscriptions of the Tenth Century B.C. from Byblus, JAOS 67 (1947): 153–154.
