= Nathan-melech =

One of Josiah's officials in the Hebrew Bible

Nathan-melech (fl. 7th century BCE) is described as one of Josiah's officials in 2 Kings 23:11 of the Hebrew Bible. He lived near the entrance to the temple, close to the courtyard where King Solomon had kept chariot-horses used to worship the Moabite sun-god Chemosh. Josiah eventually disposed of the horses and chariots.

== Archeology ==
In March 2019, a clay bulla dated to the middle of the seventh or beginning of the sixth century BC was found in the Givati Parking Lot dig excavation in the City of David area of Jerusalem bearing the Ancient Hebrew inscription, "(belonging) to Nathan-melech, servant of the king". The wording on the seal was deciphered by Anat Mendel-Geberovich of the Hebrew University of Jerusalem and the Center for the Study of Ancient Jerusalem. Written in the paleo-Hebrew alphabet, it is part of a larger group of artifacts known as Canaanite and Aramaic seal inscriptions.
