= Shelomit seal =

The Shelomit seal is an elliptical black stone seal (2.1 × 1.8 cm) excavated by Eilat Mazar in Jerusalem, January 2008. It was found in a stratified layer estimated at 2,500 years old, just outside the Old City walls near the Dung Gate. Written in the paleo-Hebrew alphabet, it is part of a larger group of artifacts known as Canaanite and Aramaic seal inscriptions.

== Design ==
The stone depicts two bearded priests standing on either side of an incense altar with their hands raised forward in a position of worship. A crescent moon, symbol of the chief Babylonian god Sin, appears on the top of the altar. It has been described as a common and popular Babylonian cultic scene.

At the bottom are four Paleo-Hebrew letters: Shin, Lamed, Mem, Tau. A detailed paleographical analysis was performed by Ryan Byrne's and published by the Biblical Archaeology Society.

== Controversy ==
=== Two possible readings ===
Mazar initially read the inscription as "Temech" (תמח tmḥ), and associated it with a family named "Tamah" in Nehemiah 7:55.

According to the Book of Nehemiah, the Temech family were servants of the First Temple and were sent into exile to Babylon following its destruction by the Babylonians in 586 BCE. The family was among those who later returned to Jerusalem.

Other scholars (initially Peter van der Veen, followed by others) read the seal's letters in reverse order and suggested a reading of Shelomith (שלמת šlmt), a name found in 1Chronicles 3:19 and Ezra 8:10 dating to the same approximate time.

On January 30, 2008, the Biblical Archaeology Society published analyses by scholars with epigraphy expertise, Robert Deutsch and Anson Rainey, and Mazar agreed to revise her reading. Of this decision Mazar has written, "Despite the fact that seals are meant to be pressed into clay, some seals are nevertheless not written in mirror image-perhaps because they were engraved by a local craftsman who was not especially skilled. Another difficulty is the unclear 'tail' of the lamed [character]. Nevertheless, I now agree that the name Shelomit is the preferable reading."

=== Gender ===
Ryan Byrne published an online article presuming the name to be feminine. Christopher Heard challenged this with a comparison of all examples named in the Tanakh.

== See also ==
- Biblical archaeology
