= Eilat Mazar =

Israeli archaeologist (1956–2021)

- אילת מזר
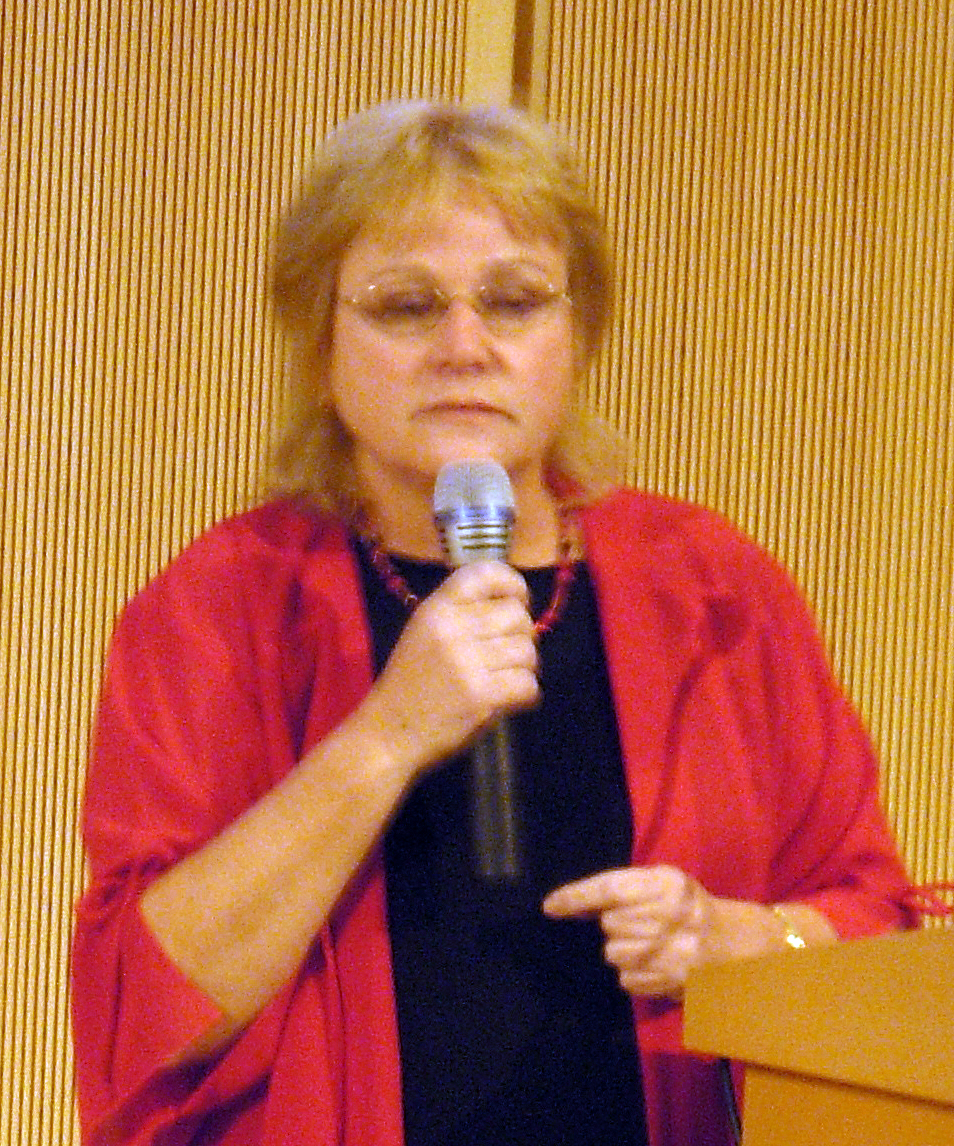
- Born: 10 September 1956
- Died: 25 May 2021 (aged 64)
- Citizenship: Israeli
- Education: Hebrew University of Jerusalem
- Known for: Discovery of the Large Stone Structure
- Scientific career
- Fields: Archaeology
- Workplaces: Shalem Center, Institute of Archaeology at the Hebrew University

Eilat Mazar (Hebrew: אילת מזר; 10 September 1956 – 25 May 2021) was an Israeli archaeologist. She specialized in Jerusalem and Phoenician archaeology. She was also a key person in Biblical archaeology noted for her discovery of the Large Stone Structure, which she surmised to be the palace of King David.

== Biography ==
Eilat Mazar was born on 10 September 1956. She was the granddaughter of pioneering Israeli archaeologist Benjamin Mazar, who served as president of the Hebrew University of Jerusalem, and the second cousin of Amihai Mazar, a professor of Archaeology at the Hebrew University as well. She obtained a Bachelor of Arts from that same institution, before joining the excavation team of Yigal Shiloh in 1981 and working there for four years. She was granted a Doctor of Philosophy from Hebrew University in 1997. Her thesis was written on the culture of Phoenicia, based on the excavations she undertook in Achziv.

Mazar had one daughter from her first marriage, which ended in divorce. Her second marriage was to Yair Shoham, who was also an archaeologist. They remained married until his death from a heart attack in 1997, at the age of 44. Together, they had three sons.

Mazar died on 25 May 2021. She was 64, and suffered from an unspecified long illness prior to her death.

== Archaeology career ==
Mazar served as a senior fellow at the Shalem Center. She worked on the Temple Mount excavations and excavations at Achzib. She was previously head of Shalem Center's Institute of Archaeology.

=== The Large Stone Structure ("King David's palace") ===
On 4 August 2005, Mazar announced she had discovered in Jerusalem what may have been the palace of the biblical King David, according to the Bible the second king of a united Kingdom of Israel, who may have ruled in the late eleventh century/early tenth century BCE. Now referred to as the Large Stone structure, Mazar's discovery consists of a public building she dated from the 10th century BCE, a copper scroll, pottery from the same period, and a clay bulla, or inscribed seal, of Jehucal, son of Shelemiah, son of Shevi, an official mentioned at least twice in the Book of Jeremiah. In July 2008, she also found a second bulla, belonging to Gedaliah ben Pashhur, who is mentioned together with Jehucal in Jeremiah 38:1. The dig was sponsored by the Shalem Center and financed by an American investment banker, Baron Corso de Palenzuela Ha Levi-Kahana Mayuha. The land is owned by the Ir David Foundation.

Amihai Mazar, a professor of archeology at Hebrew University, and Mazar's second cousin, called the find "something of a miracle". He has said that he believes that the building may be the Fortress of Zion that David is said to have captured. Other scholars are skeptical that the foundation walls are from David's palace. They suggest that the Large Stone Structure is a massive Jebusite building that was constructed at the end of Jebusite rule over Jerusalem. In her preliminary report published in 2009, Dr. Mazar recognized that this was possible, but she also explained why it is highly unlikely. The Jebusites would not have invested the time and resources necessary to build a massive palatial structure outside their fortress city, at a time when the Israelites were growing in power and preparing to conquer the Jebusite territory.

=== Nehemiah's wall ===
In 2007 Mazar uncovered what she suggested was Nehemiah's wall.

==== Solomonic gate and tower ====
In 2010 Mazar announced the discovery of part of the ancient city walls around the City of David which she believed date to the tenth century BCE. According to Mazar, "It's the most significant construction we have from First Temple days in Israel" and "It means that at that time, the 10th century, in Jerusalem there was a regime capable of carrying out such construction." The tenth century BCE is the period the Bible describes as the reign of King Solomon. Not all archaeologists believe that there was a strong state at that time, and the archaeologist Aren Maeir is dubious about such claims and about Mazar's dating.

=== Ophel inscription ===
In 2012, Mazar announced the discovery of inscription at the Ophel excavation. The Ophel inscription was made on a large storage jar, and only a piece of 8 letters has been preserved. Several readings were suggested, as well as several attributions, possibly to Jebusites or to Hebrews. It dates to 11th–10th century BCE.

=== Ophel gold hoard ===
On 9 September 2013, the Hebrew University of Jerusalem announced Mazar's discovery of the Ophel Treasure at the foot of Temple Mount, dating to the end of the Byzantine period (beginning of the 7th century). The 1,400-year-old cache contained a gold medallion on which a menorah, a shofar and a Torah scroll are etched.

=== Bulla of Hezekiah ===
In 2015, Mazar made the discovery of the royal bulla of the biblical Hezekiah, which reads "Belonging to Hezekiah [son of] Ahaz king of Judah" and dates to between 727–698 BCE. This was, according to Mazar, "the first time that a seal impression of an Israelite or Judean king has ever come to light in a scientific archaeological excavation."

=== Bulla of Isaiah ===
Main article: Isaiah seal

In 2018 Mazar published a report discussing the discovery of another bulla which she said may have belonged to Isaiah, a prophet and contemporary of Hezekiah. She believed the fragment to have been part of a seal whose complete text might have read "Belonging to Isaiah the prophet." Other experts, including George Washington University's Christopher Rollston, have pointed to the bulla being incomplete, and that the present inscription does not necessarily refer to the biblical figure.

== Scientific approach ==
Mazar was a biblical maximalist and, according to herself, "I work with the Bible in one hand and the tools of excavation in the other, and I try to consider everything."

Israel Finkelstein and other archaeologists from Tel Aviv University have flagged concern that, with reference to her 2006 dating of the "Solomonic city wall" in the area to the south of the Temple Mount known as the "Ophel", "the biblical text dominates this field operation, not archaeology. Had it not been for Mazar's literal reading of the biblical text, she never would have dated the remains to the 10th century BCE with such confidence. However, Amihai Mazar and other archaeologists from the Hebrew University of Jerusalem have defended Mazar's work and scholars now agree with Mazar's dating of this structure.

Mazar was cautioned by epigrapher Ryan Byrne following the 2008 confusion over the inscription on the Shelomit seal, that "in the mad dash to report biblical artifacts to the public or connect discoveries with the most obscure persons or events reported in the Bible, there is sometimes a tendency to compromise the analytical caution that objects of such value so dearly deserve."

== Published works ==
- Mazar, Eilat (2006). "Did I Find King David's Palace?". Biblical Archaeology Review. 32 (1) (January/February): 16–27, 70. ISSN 0098-9444
- Mazar, Eilat (2004). The Phoenician Family Tomb N.1 at the Northern Cemetery of Achziv (10th-6th centuries BCE). Sam Turner Expedition. Final Report of the Excavations (Cuadernos de Arquelogia Mediterranea 10), Barcelona.
- Mazar, Eilat (2003). The Phoenicians in Achziv, The Southern Cemetery. Jerome L. Joss Expedition. Final Report of Excavations 1988-1990 (Cuadernos de Arquelogia Mediterranea 7), Barcelona.
- Mazar, Eilat (2003). The Temple Mount Excavations in Jerusalem 1968–1978 Directed by Benjamin Mazar Final Reports Vol. II: The Byzantine and Early Islamic Periods. Qedem. Vol. 43. Jerusalem: Institute of Archaeology, Hebrew University of Jerusalem.
- Mazar, Eilat (2002). The Complete Guide to the Temple Mount Excavations. Jerusalem: Shoham Academic Research and Publication. ISBN 965-90299-1-8.
- Mazar, Eilat (1999). The Monastery of the Virgins - Byzantine Period - Temple Mount Excavations in Jerusalem. Institute of Archaeology, Hebrew University of Jerusalem.
- Mazar, Eilat. with Mazar, B. (1989). "Excavations in the South of the Temple Mount". The Ophel of Biblical Jerusalem, Jerusalem.

== See also ==
- Archaeology of Israel
- Women of Israel
