= John Felix Jones =

British captain in the Indian navy and surveyor

- Occupations: Captain in the Indian navy and surveyor

John Felix Jones (died 3 September 1878) was a British captain in the Indian navy and surveyor.

== Biography ==
Jones was, as midshipman and lieutenant of the East India Company's ship Palinurus, under Commander Robert Moresby, engaged in the survey of the northern part of the Red Sea, 1829–34. The charts were principally drawn by Jones. He was next employed in the survey of Ceylon and the Gulf of Manaar, under Lieutenant Powell, and in May 1840 joined Lieutenant C. D. Campbell, commanding the Nitocris, in the survey of Mesopotamia, in the course of which he connected the Euphrates and Mediterranean by chronometric measurements for longitude. In October 1841 Captain Lynch commenced the survey of the Euphrates, and on his retirement in 1843 was succeeded by Jones, who continued for several years the examination of the Tigris and Euphrates. Consequent on the disputes between Persia and Turkey in 1843, Jones, in company with Major Sir Henry Rawlinson, was sent in August 1844 to collect information respecting the boundary, the results obtained being officially printed in 1849, under the title ‘Narrative of a Journey through Parts of Persia and Kurdistan.’ In 1848 Jones examined the course of the ancient Nahrwan canal, and surveyed the once fertile region which it irrigated. In 1850 he surveyed the old bed of the Tigris, discovered the site of the ancient Opis, and made researches in the vicinity of the Median wall and Physcus of Xenophon (cf. Smith, Dictionary of Greek and Roman Geography). In 1852 he made a trigonometrical survey of the country between the Tigris and the Upper Zab, including the ruins of Nineveh, the results of which are recorded in a series of maps of ‘Assyrian Vestiges,’ and the accompanying memoir. In 1853 he completed a map of Bagdad on a large scale, with a memoir on the province. In 1854 he was named political agent at Bagdad and consul-general in Turkish Arabia. In 1855 he was appointed political agent in the Persian Gulf, and in that capacity was able to render important services during the war in 1856, and still more during the mutiny of 1857–8. Broken health then compelled him to return to England, and, though he revisited Bombay in 1863, he had no further active employment. His later years were spent in geographical work for the India office, and in 1875 he completed a beautifully drawn map, in four sheets, of Western Asia, including the valleys of the Tigris and Euphrates; it remains in manuscript in the India office. He was also a constant contributor to the ‘Geographical Magazine’ and an active fellow of the Royal Geographical Society. He died at Norwood on 3 September 1878.

The most important of his numerous memoirs are included in ‘Selections from the Records of the Bombay Government,’ 1857, new ser. No. 43.
