= Jerusalem Stone =

Ancient artifact

- Material: Stone
- Writing: Hebrew
- Created: 1st century BCE
- Discovered: Jerusalem, Israel
- Present location: Israel Museum
- Period: Hasmonean Period

The Jerusalem Stone is an artifact from the Hasmonean period.

== The stone ==
Archaeologists have discovered an ancient stone inscribed with the Hebrew text "Jerusalem," spelled identically to its modern form. The block was part of a carved column in a Roman-style structure.

Text:

"Hananiah son of Dodalos of Jerusalem"

== See also ==
- Hyrcanus inscription
