= Moritz Abraham Levy =

German rabbi, orientalist, paleographer and numismatist

Moritz Abraham Levy (also M. A. Levy; 11 March 1817 – 22 February 1872) was a German rabbi, orientalist, paleographer and numismatist.

== Life ==
Levy was born on 11 March 1817 in Altona. His life path is not known in detail. He was trained as a rabbi and at the same time devoted himself to scientific work. When and where he received his PhD degree is unknown. He became a teacher at the Jewish Community of Breslau, in which he was active for almost thirty years. Among other things, he taught at the Jewish Theological Seminary of Breslau founded by Zecharias Frankel.

Levy was awarded the Professor title by King Wilhelm I of Prussia in 1865. He was a prolific writer who, in addition to his monographs, regularly published in the Zeitschrift der Deutschen Morgenländische Gesellschaft and also processed the estate of Ernst Osiander.

Levy died on 22 February 1872 in Breslau. He was buried in the Old Jewish Cemetery of Wrocław.

== Works ==
- Hebräisches Lesebuch, Auswahl historischer, poetischer und prophetischer Stücke aus fast allen biblischen Büchern mit Anmerkungen und einem Wörterbuch, Leuckart, Breslau 1847.
- Phönizische Studien, Bände 1–3, Leuckart, Breslau 1856–1864, Band 4, Schletter, Breslau 1870.
- Bibelkunde für israelitische Schulen, Leuckart, Breslau 1859.
- Don Joseph Nasi, Herzog von Naxos, seine Familie und zwei jüdische Diplomaten seiner Zeit: eine Biographie nach neuen Quellen dargestellt.,
- Geschichte der jüdischen Münzen, Nies, Leipzig 1862.
- Zur pönizischen Münzkunde Mauritaniens: Münzen von Syphax, Vermina und Bochus, Breslau 1863.
- Ueber eine lateinisch-griechisch-phönizische Inschrift aus Sardinien, Kreysing, Leipzig 1863.
- Sara Copia Sullam: Lebensbild einer jüdischen italienischen Dichterin aus dem siebzehnten Jahrhundert, Leipzig 1863.
- Phönizisches Wörterbuch, Schletter, Breslau 1864.
- (Hrsg.): Ernst Osiander: Zur himjarischen Alterthumskunde, Kreysing, Leipzig 1864.
- Die biblische Geschichte nach dem Worte der heiligen Schrift der israelitischen Jugend, Schletter, Leipzig 1866.
- Spruchbuch: systematisch geordnetes als Leitfaden für denjüdischen Religionsunterricht, Schletter, Leipzig 1867.
- Siegel und Gemmen mit aramäischen, phönizischen, althebräischen, himjarischen, nabathäischen und altsyrischen Inschriften, Schletter, Leipzig 1869.
- (Übrs.): Salomon Munk: Palästina: geographische, historische und archäologische Beschreibung dieses Landes und kurze Geschichte seiner hebräischen und jüdischen Bewohner, 2 Bände, Leiner, Leipzig 1871–1872.
