= Yeho'ezer ben Hosh'ayahu seal =

Ancient Jerusalem seal

The Yeho'ezer ben Hosh'ayahu seal is a rare 2,700-year-old seal of the First Temple Period discovered in Jerusalem in 2024. The seal, written in the paleo-Hebrew alphabet, features an neo-Assyrian-styled image of a winged figure with an inscription in Paleo-Hebrew letters of the name of Yehoʼezer ben Hoshʼayahu. It is part of a larger group of artifacts known as Canaanite and Aramaic seal inscriptions.

Archaeologists posit that this seal reveals the cultural impact that the Assyrian Empire had on the ancient Judah region.

== Discovery ==
The black stone seal was discovered in the Jerusalem Archaeological Park near the southern wall of the Temple Mount. Inscribed on the seal in Paleo-Hebrew is the inscription: LYHWʿZR BN HWŠʿYHW, "(Belonging) to Yeho'ezer, son of Hosha'yahu", along with an image of a winged figure.

The excavation directors shared their thoughts regarding the discovery and said described it as an

“extremely rare and unusual stone seal... bearing a name inscribed in paleo-Hebrew script and a winged figure . . . one of the most beautiful ever discovered in excavations in ancient Jerusalem.”

== Artifact ==
The stone seal itself was likely created by a local artist within Judea. It is curved outward and has a hole drilled through it so it could be put on a string and worn as a chain around the neck. On the seal is the profiled winged figure of a man with long curly hair, wearing a crown or a hat, a long tunic, with one of his arms reaching out forward with the palm open. On the left- and right-hand sides of the figure, there is an inscription in Paleo-Hebrew letters.

It seems that the seal belonged to a man by the name of "Hosh'ayahu". His son "Yeho'ezer" inherited the seal, then added his name alongside his father's name, hoping to benefit from the stone's magical powers.

The names inscribed on the stone seal are known from the Hebrew Bible (Tanakh). The name "Yeho'ezer", which is the non-abbreviated form of the name Yo'ezer, appears in the Book of Chronicles I 12:7, as the name of one of King David's heroes. The name "Hosh'ayahu" appears in the Book of Jeremiah 43:2, as he describes that time period and mentions a man named "Azariah ben Hoshʼaya".

The art and style shown on the stone seal and the use of a winged figured man on a talisman are clear indications of how the Assyrian Empire had influenced the areas and kingdoms that came under its conquest.

Yuval Baruch, who directed the excavation, suggested that the writing on the seal indicated "literacy in this period was not the realm only of society's elite. People knew how to read and write – at least at the basic level, for the needs of commerce".

== See also ==
- God on the Winged Wheel coin
- Isaiah bulla
- King Hezekiah bulla
- Archaeology of Israel
- Jerusalem Archaeological Park
