= King Hezekiah bulla =

Ancient bulla found in Jerusalem

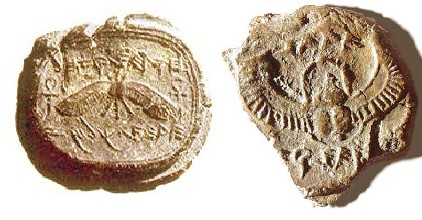
Bulla of Hezekiah

The King Hezekiah bulla is a 3 mm thick soft bulla (piece of clay with the impression of a seal) measuring 13 × 12 mm (½ in × ½ in). It was found in an archaeological excavation together with 33 other seals, figurines and ceramics, in an ancient refuse dump adjacent to the Temple Mount in Jerusalem by Israeli archaeologist Eilat Mazar. Written in the paleo-Hebrew alphabet, it is part of a larger group of artifacts known as Canaanite and Aramaic seal inscriptions.

== Description ==
The bulla, excavated in 2009–2010 and released in 2015 by Dr. Eilat Mazar, was dated to the reign of Judean king Hezekiah between 716 and 686 BCE and bears an inscription in Paleo-Hebrew script: "Belonging to Hezekiah [son of] Ahaz king of Judah," and a two-winged sun, with wings turned downward, flanked by two ankh symbols symbolizing life.

== Location ==
The building in which the bulla was found had been an administrative or royal building that the Babylonians destroyed when they conquered Jerusalem in 586 BCE. According to Mazar, "although seal impressions bearing King Hezekiah's name have already been known from the antiquities market since the middle of the 1990s, some with a winged scarab (dung beetle) symbol and others with a winged sun, this is the first time that a seal impression of an Israelite or Judean king has ever come to light in a scientific archaeological excavation.

== King Hezekiah ==
The bulla attests that Jerusalem in King Hezekiah's time had a highly developed administrative system. Commenting on the discovery, Christopher Rollston of George Washington University said that the presence of ankh, an Egyptian symbol on a seal was not surprising as Judah had formed alliances with Egypt at various times during its history.

The Ophel is part of the ancient city of Jerusalem situated immediately south of the Temple Mount, the site of two Jewish temples in antiquity, considered to be the holiest site in Judaism and the third holiest site of Islam. Excavations at the site, a collaborative effort by the Israel Antiquities Authority and Hebrew University had unearthed some of the earliest artifacts ever found in Jerusalem dating as far back as the 12th and 11th centuries BCE.

== Text ==
Text	𐤋𐤇𐤆𐤒𐤉𐤄𐤅𐤀𐤇 𐤆𐤌𐤋𐤊 𐤉𐤄𐤃𐤄
Transliteration	lḥzqyhw ’ḥz mlk yhdh
Translation	of Hezekiah (son of) Ahaz, king of Judah
