= King Ahaz's seal =

Ancient Jewish seal

King Ahaz's seal is a bulla (impressed piece of clay) originating from the 8th century BCE. The place of discovery of this seal is unknown, and it is currently part of Shlomo Moussaieff's private collection. The seal contains an ancient Hebrew inscription mentioning the name of Ahaz of Judah, as well as the name of his father, Jotham (Jotham), identifying Ahaz as the "king of Judah". The bulla contains a fingerprint which may belong to Ahaz himself. Written in the paleo-Hebrew alphabet, it is part of a larger group of artifacts known as Canaanite and Aramaic seal inscriptions.

== Text ==
Text	𐤋𐤀𐤇𐤆 𐤉𐤄𐤅𐤕𐤌 𐤌𐤋𐤊 𐤉𐤄𐤃𐤄
Transliteration	l’ḥz yhwtm mlk yhdh
Translation	(belonging) to ’Aḥaz (son of) Yehotam, king of Judah

Another extra-biblical source regarding the historicity of Ahaz comes from Tiglath-Pileser III, mentioning tributes he received in gold and silver from Ahaz, and from the bulla known as Ushna seal.

== Authenticity ==
Unprovenanced artifacts that originate in the antiquities market are subject to authentication disputes. The authenticity of ancient bullae has been the topic of scholarly discussion. According to Robert Deutsch, an archeologist who is also the antique dealer who sold the Ahaz bulla, most scholars believe the bullae to be authentic. Others, such as Andrew Vaughn, agree that it would be difficult to fake a bulla, but do not rule out such a possibility, and in fact conclude that some bullae are forgeries.

== Other seals ==
Other contemporary seals include the two ascribed to ministers of Uzziah and a seal of Hezekiah.

== See also ==
- LMLK seal
- Shema Seal
