= Christopher Rollston =

American philologist

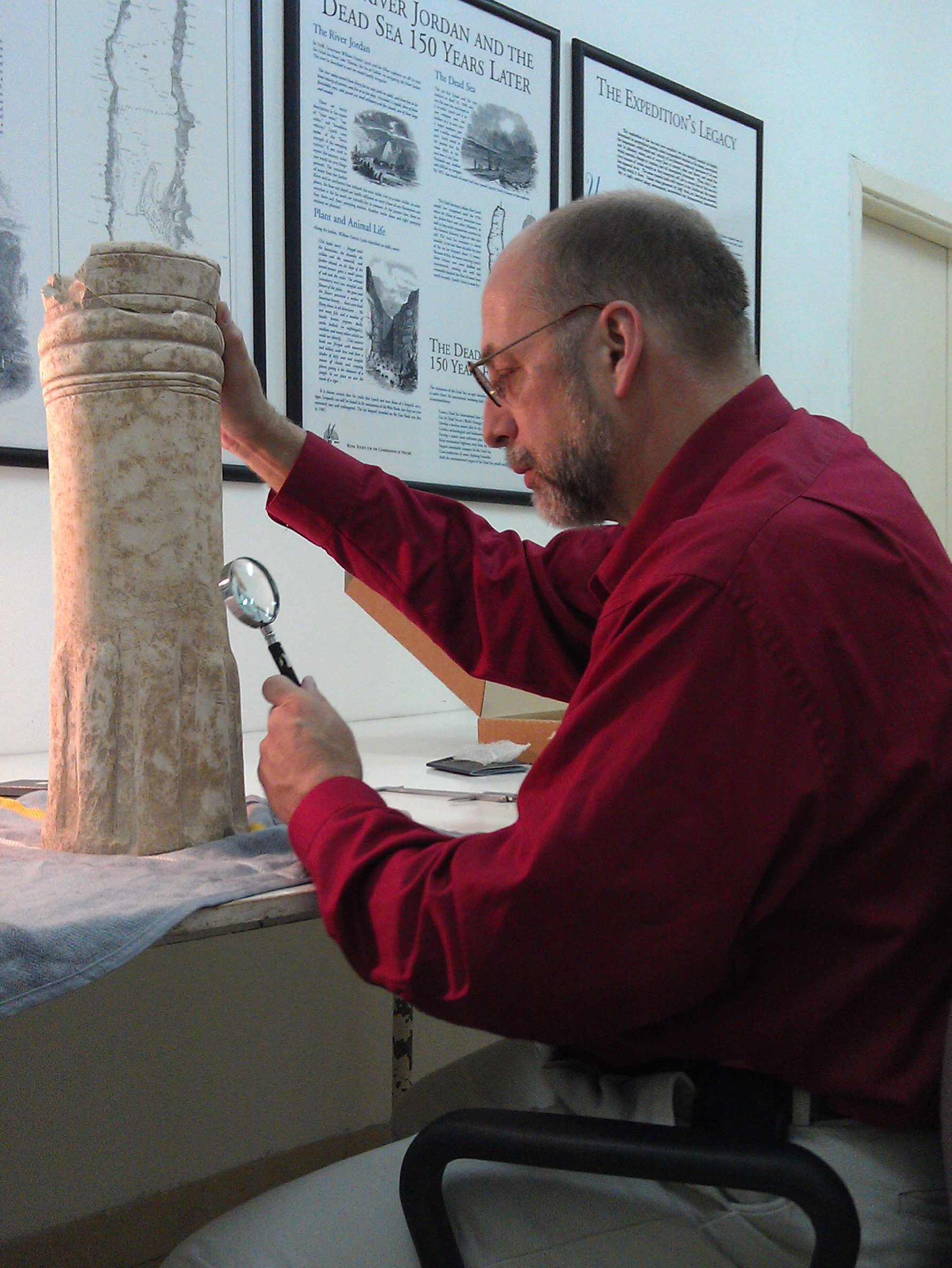
- Rollston collating an inscribed pedestal in 2013
- Born: c. 1960 (age c. 65); Michigan, United States
- Education: Johns Hopkins University (PhD)
- Known for: Research in biblical literature.
- Scientific career
- Fields: Philology
- Workplaces: George Washington University
- Website: cnelc.columbian.gwu.edu/christopher-rollston

Christopher A. Rollston (born c. 1960) is a scholar of the ancient Near East, specializing in Hebrew Bible, Greek New Testament, Old Testament Apocrypha, Northwest Semitic literature, epigraphy, and paleography.

== Biography ==
Rollston holds an MA and PhD from Johns Hopkins University Department of Near Eastern Studies. He also holds an MAR from Emmanuel School of Religion (now known as Emmanuel Christian Seminary), and an undergraduate degree from Great Lakes Christian College. Rollston is a member of Phi Beta Kappa society. He is Professor of Northwest Semitic Languages and Literatures at George Washington University and is chair of the department of Classical and Near Eastern Languages and Civilizations there. He has been a National Endowment for the Humanities Research Scholar at the Albright Institute of Archaeological Research in Jerusalem (Fall 2013) and also at the American Center of Oriental Research in Amman (Summer 2002). He was a Visiting Professor of Northwest Semitic Literature at Tel Aviv University, Department of Archaeology in Spring 2014. Recently, the Chronicle of Higher Education did a profile story about Rollston’s research and writing.

His primary research interests include the Hebrew Bible in its ancient cultural contexts, Northwest Semitic epigraphy and paleography, ancient writing practices, scribes and scribal education, literacy in the ancient world, origins and early use of the alphabet, ancient and modern epigraphic forgeries, inscribed ossuaries, personal names, prosopography, ancient religion, ancient wisdom literature, prophecy in the ancient Near Eastern and Mediterranean context, Septuagint, Dead Sea Scrolls. During recent years, his publications on the Qeiyafa Ostracon, the Tel Zayit Abecedary, and the Talpiyot (Jerusalem) Tombs have been considered particularly important.

Rollston's monograph entitled Writing and Literacy in Ancient Israel: Epigraphic Evidence from the Iron Age was published by the Society of Biblical Literature in October 2010. The following year it was selected by the American Schools of Oriental Research for the prestigious "Frank Moore Cross Prize" as the most substantial volume in the field of Northwest Semitic Epigraphy.

Rollston has published articles in a number of refereed journals, including the Bulletin of the American Schools of Oriental Research, the Journal of Biblical Literature, Near Eastern Archaeology, Antiguo Oriente and Israel Exploration Journal. He has also published in Biblical Archaeology Review, Archaeology, and HuffPost. In recent years he has served as an epigraphic consultant for the National Geographic Society and he also testified in the forgery trial in Jerusalem at the behest of the prosecution.

In addition to the National Endowment for the Humanities, Rollston's research has been funded by various agencies and organizations, including the National Endowment for the Humanities, the Society of Biblical Literature, and the American Schools of Oriental Research. Moreover, he has excavated in Syria and in Israel and has conducted research at museums and departments of antiquity in Lebanon, Israel, Jordan, and Syria, and at various museums in the United States and Europe. He has lectured and delivered invited papers in a number of venues, including Hebrew University (Jerusalem), Al-Quds University (Jerusalem), Vanderbilt University, George Washington University, the University of Michigan, Brown University, Duke University, Tel Aviv University, Baylor University and the University of Wisconsin.

Rollston is active in the American Schools of Oriental Research and the Society of Biblical Literature (and has chaired and co-chaired epigraphic sessions for the annual meetings of both). He served for several years on the Governing Board of the American Schools of Oriental Research, and has also served on the Editorial Board of the Bulletin of the American Schools of Oriental Research and currently serves as the co-editor of this journal (with Eric H. Cline). He has been the editor of the journal MAARAV for more than a decade. In addition, he served on a regular basis on Reaffirmation Committees (on-site and off-site) for the Southern Association of Colleges and Schools.

In Fall 2018, Rollston was initiated as an honorary member of the Alpha chapter of Delta Iota Gamma fraternity, the world's first archaeology fraternity.

== Bibliography ==
=== Books ===
- Enemies and Friends of the State: Ancient Prophecy in Context, Christopher A. Rollston (as editor and contributor). Penn State University Press, an Eisenbrauns imprint, 2018.
- Forging History in the Biblical World: Textual Forgeries from the Ancient and Modern Middle East, Medieval Europe, and the New World. Forthcoming
- Writing and Literacy in the World of Ancient Israel: Epigraphic Evidence from the Iron Age (SBL Archaeology and Biblical Studies, 2010).
- The Gospels According to Michael Goulder: A North American Response (as editor). Trinity Press International, 2002.
