= Isaiah 62 =

Book of Isaiah, chapter 62

- ← chapter 61 chapter 63 →
- The Great Isaiah Scroll, the best preserved of the biblical scrolls found at Qumran from the second century BC, contains all the verses in this chapter.
- Book: Book of Isaiah
- Hebrew Bible part: Nevi'im
- Order in the Hebrew part: 5
- Category: Latter Prophets
- Christian Bible part: Old Testament
- Order in the Christian part: 23

Isaiah 62 is the sixty-second chapter of the Book of Isaiah in the Hebrew Bible or the Old Testament of the Christian Bible. This book contains the prophecies attributed to the prophet Isaiah, and is one of the Books of the Prophets. Chapters 56–66 are often referred to as Trito-Isaiah. In chapters 60–62, "three magnificent chapters", the prophet "hails the rising sun of Jerusalem’s prosperity".

== Text ==
The original text was written in Hebrew language. This chapter is divided into 12 verses.

=== Textual witnesses ===
Some early manuscripts containing the text of this chapter in Hebrew are of the Masoretic Text tradition, which includes the Codex Cairensis (895), the Petersburg Codex of the Prophets (916), Aleppo Codex (10th century), Codex Leningradensis (1008).

Fragments containing parts of this chapter were found among the Dead Sea Scrolls (3rd century BC or later):

- 1QIsa^{a}: complete
- 1QIsa^{b}: extant: verses 2–12

There is also a translation into Koine Greek known as the Septuagint, made in the last few centuries BC. Extant ancient manuscripts of the Septuagint version include Codex Vaticanus (B; $\mathfrak{G}$^{B}; 4th century), Codex Sinaiticus (S; BHK: $\mathfrak{G}$^{S}; 4th century), Codex Alexandrinus (A; $\mathfrak{G}$^{A}; 5th century) and Codex Marchalianus (Q; $\mathfrak{G}$^{Q}; 6th century).

== Parashot ==
The parashah sections listed here are based on the Aleppo Codex. Isaiah 62 is a part of the Consolations (Isaiah 40–66). {P}: open parashah; {S}: closed parashah.

[{P} 61:10-11] 62:1-9 {S} 62:10-12 {S}

== Zion's new names (62:1–9) ==
The first part of the poem in this chapter envisages the astonishing transformation of Zion as a result of the divine plan of its 'vindication' (sedeq) and 'salvation' (yesu'a), that bring blessings for Zion in form of a new name and royal status. The new name for the restored city (Jeremiah 33:16; Ezekiel 48:35) does not necessarily abandon the old one (cf. Jacob was still known as Jacob although was given a new name "Israel"; Genesis 32:28; 35:10), but rather to signify the imagery changes (verse 6) of the city as the marriage-partner of YHWH from the 'desolate' condition in Isaiah 1:7, while witnessed by foreign nations.

=== Verse 4 ===
Thou shalt no more be termed Forsaken;

neither shall thy land any more be termed Desolate:

but thou shalt be called Hephzibah,

and thy land Beulah:

for the Lord delighteth in thee,

and thy land shall be married.

- "Forsaken": translated from the Hebrew word "Azubah" (עֲזוּבָ֗ה), also the name of Jehoshaphat's mother (1 Kings 22:42).
- "Desolate": translated from the Hebrew word "shemamah" (שְׁמָמָ֔ה; cf. Jeremiah 34:22; Jeremiah 44:2, 6; Ezekiel 33:29; Ezekiel 36:34). Ezekiel prophesied the change:

"The land that was desolate is become like the garden of Eden; and the waste and desolate and ruined cities are become fenced and are inhabited" (Ezekiel 36:35).

- "Hephzibah": literally, "My Delight Is in Her", also the name of King Hezekiah's wife which gave birth to king Manasseh (2 Kings 21:1). Hephzibah in this verse is a symbolic name for Zion once it has been restored to the favor of Yahweh.
- "Beulah": in Hebrew means "married". see Isaiah 54:1.

== Zion's coming salvation (62:10–12) ==
The passage links to chapter 40 with the theme of 'building the highway' (verse 10), the 'processional way' up into the restored city, and the identity of verse 11 (the last part) with Isaiah 40:10. The restoration started in verse 4 is completed with the names for the community in verse 12: "what once was called 'forsaken' shall be so no longer".

=== Verse 10 ===
Go through, go through the gates; prepare ye the way of the people; cast up, cast up the highway; gather out the stones; lift up a standard for the people.

The double imperatives are a marked feature of chapter 40–66 of the book.

=== Verse 12 ===
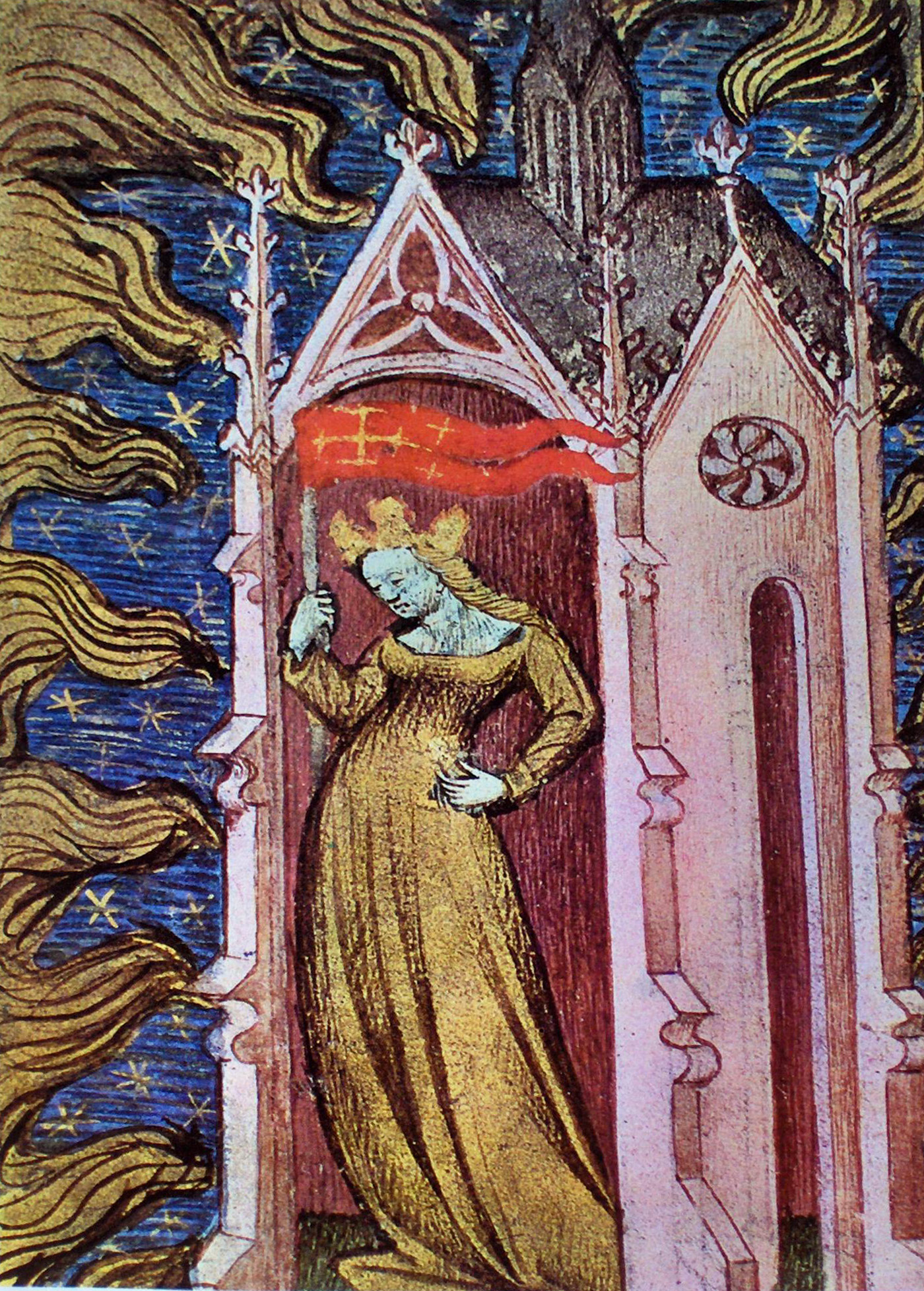
"And you will be called Sought Out, A city not forsaken" (Isaiah 62:12) - Miniature from "L'Eglise", The Rohan Master: a book of hours

And they shall call them,

The holy people,
The redeemed of the Lord:

and thou shalt be called,

Sought out,
A city not forsaken.

- "Sought out": that is, found after being 'lost' (Ezekiel 34:16) or 'no one seeks her' (Jeremiah 30:17).
- "A city not forsaken": a special reference to the name "Azubah" in Isaiah 62:4 (cf. name changes in Hosea 2:1).

== See also ==
- Hephzibah
- Related Bible parts: 2 Kings 21, 1 Peter 2

== Sources ==
- Coggins, R (2007). "22. Isaiah". In Barton, John; Muddiman, John (eds.). The Oxford Bible Commentary (first (paperback) ed.). Oxford University Press. pp. 433–486. ISBN 978-0199277186.
- Würthwein, Ernst (1995). The Text of the Old Testament. Translated by Rhodes, Erroll F. Grand Rapids, MI: Wm. B. Eerdmans. ISBN 0-8028-0788-7.
