= Hephzibah =

Biblical figure; female given name

Hephzibah or Hepzibah (English: /ˈhɛfzɪbə/ or /ˈhɛpzɪbə/; Hebrew: חֶפְצִי־בָהּ, romanized: Ḥep̄ṣi-ḇāh, lit. 'my delight (is) in her') is a minor figure in the Books of Kings in the Hebrew Bible. She was the wife of Hezekiah, king of Judah (reigned c. 715 and 686 BCE), and the mother of Manasseh of Judah (reigned c. 687–643 BCE).

== Biblical and rabbinic accounts ==
Hephzibah is depicted in 2 Kings 21:1. According to Rabbinic literature, Isaiah was the maternal grandfather of Manasseh.

== Symbolic name ==
The name Hephzibah is also used as a symbolic name for Zion following its restoration to the favor of Yahweh in Isaiah 62:4.

== See also ==
- Isaiah 62
