= Abijah (queen) =

Queen consort of Judea
- Reign: c.732 – 716 BCE
- Spouse: Ahaz
- Issue: Hezekiah
- Father: Zachariah

Abijah is a person named in the Old Testament. She was the daughter of a Zachariah, possibly Zachariah the son of Jeberechiah (2 Chronicles 29:1; compare Book of Isaiah 8:2), and afterwards the wife of King Ahaz (reigned c. 732 - 716 BCE) and mother of King Hezekiah (reigned c. 715-686 BCE). She is also called Abi (2 Kings 18:2).

Some writers consider Abijah to be the almah or "young woman" (at the time of the prophecy) in the Immanuel prophecy in Isaiah 7:14, and that the child who will be an infant when Rezin and Pekah are defeated by Tiglath-Pileser III (reigned 745–727 BCE) may be the future heir, Hezekiah.
