= Isaiah =

Israelite prophet

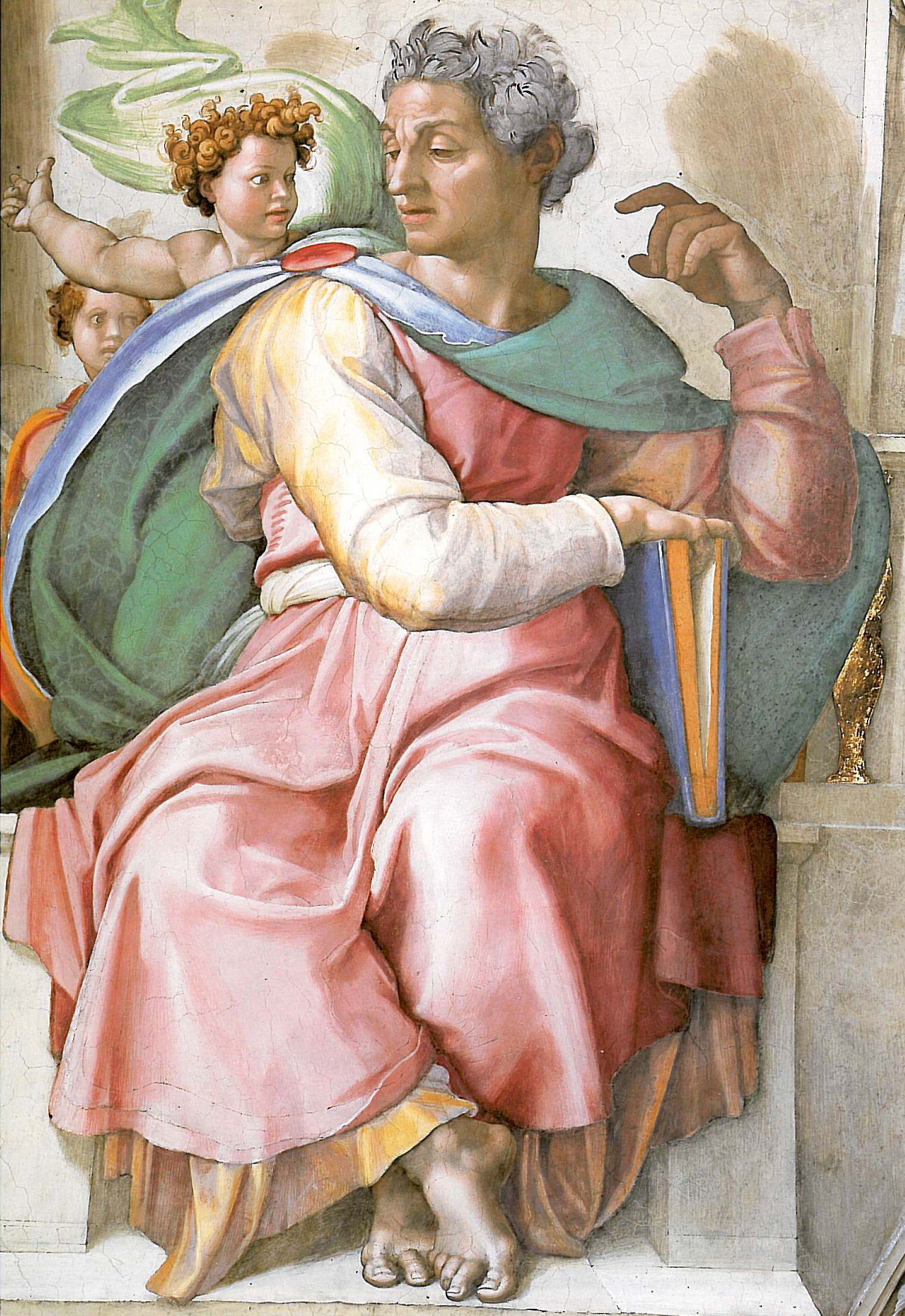
- Fresco from the Sistine Chapel ceiling by Michelangelo

Prophet
- Born: 8th century BC
- Died: 7th century BC
- Venerated in: Judaism; Christianity; Islam; Baháʼí Faith; Rastafari
- Feast: May 9 Thursday after the Feast of the Transfiguration (Armenian Apostolic Church)
- Major works: Book of Isaiah

Isaiah (UK: /aɪˈzaɪ.ə/ or US: /aɪˈzeɪ.ə/; Hebrew: יְשַׁעְיָהוּ, Yəšaʿyāhū, "Yahweh is salvation"; also known as Isaias or Esaias from Greek: Ἠσαΐας) was the Israelite prophet, dated to the 8th century BC, after whom the Book of Isaiah is named.

The text of the Book of Isaiah refers to Isaiah as "the prophet", but the exact relationship between the Book of Isaiah and the actual prophet Isaiah is complicated. The traditional view is that all 66 chapters of the book of Isaiah were written by one man, Isaiah, possibly in two periods between 740 BC and c. 686 BC, separated by approximately 15 years.

Another widely held view suggests that parts of the first half of the book (chapters 1–39) originated with the historical prophet, interspersed with prose commentaries written in the time of King Josiah 100 years later, and that the remainder of the book dates from immediately before and immediately after the end of the exile in Babylon in the 6th century BC (almost two centuries after the time of the historical prophet), and that perhaps these later chapters represent the work of an ongoing school of prophets who prophesied in accordance with his prophecies. (Note: See the article "Book of Isaiah" for an extended overview of theories of its composition.)

== Biography ==
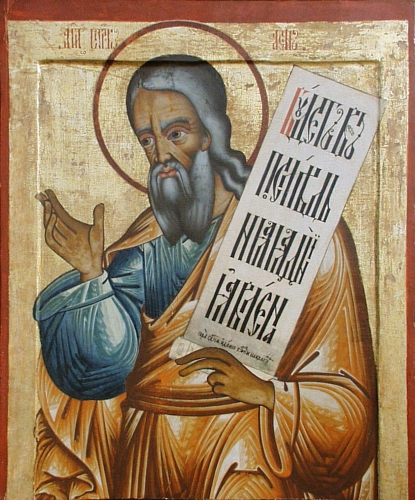
Russian icon of the Prophet Isaiah, 18th century (iconostasis of Transfiguration Church, Kizhi monastery, Karelia, Russia)

The first verse of the Book of Isaiah states that Isaiah prophesied during the reigns of Uzziah (or Azariah), Jotham, Ahaz, and Hezekiah, the kings of Judah. Uzziah's reign was 52 years in the middle of the 8th century BC, and Isaiah must have begun his ministry a few years before Uzziah's death, probably in the 740s BC. He may have been contemporary with Manasseh for some years. Thus, Isaiah may have prophesied for as long as 64 years.

According to some modern interpretations, Isaiah's wife was called "the prophetess", either because she was endowed with the prophetic gift, like Deborah and Huldah, or simply because she was the "wife of the prophet". They had two sons, naming the elder Shear-Jashub, meaning "A remnant shall return", and the younger Maher-Shalal-Hash-Baz, meaning, "Quickly to spoils, plunder speedily." According to the Jewish interpretation of Isaiah 7:14 the two also had a son named Immanuel, a verse interpreted by Christians as prophesizing the virgin birth of Jesus.

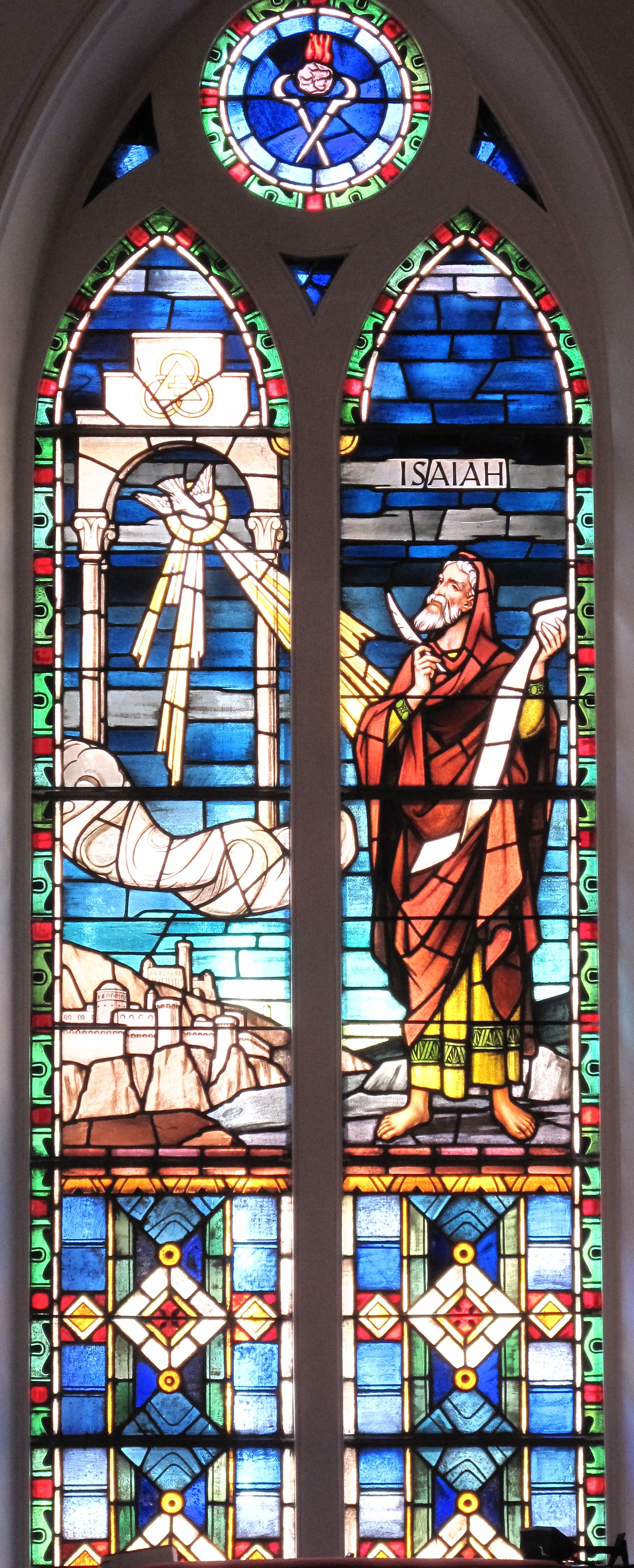
Isaiah receives his vision of the LORD's house. A stained glass window at St. Matthew's German Evangelical Lutheran Church in Charleston, South Carolina.

Soon after this, Shalmaneser V determined to subdue the northern Kingdom of Israel, taking over and destroying Samaria and beginning the Assyrian captivity. So long as Ahaz reigned, the kingdom of Judah was untouched by the Assyrian power. But when Hezekiah gained the throne, he was encouraged to rebel "against the king of Assyria", and entered into an alliance with the king of Egypt. The king of Assyria threatened the king of Judah, and at length invaded the land. Sennacherib's campaign in the Levant brought his powerful army into Judah. Hezekiah was reduced to despair, and submitted to the Assyrians. But after a brief interval, war broke out again. Again Sennacherib led an army into Judah, one detachment of which threatened Jerusalem. Isaiah on that occasion encouraged Hezekiah to resist the Assyrians, whereupon Sennacherib sent a threatening letter to Hezekiah, which he "spread before the LORD".

Then Isaiah son of Amoz sent this message to Hezekiah: "Thus said GOD, the God of Israel, to whom you have prayed, concerning King Sennacherib of Assyria—

this is the word that GOD has spoken concerning him: Fair Maiden Zion despises you, She mocks at you; Fair Jerusalem shakes Her head at you. Whom have you blasphemed and reviled? Against whom made loud your voice And haughtily raised your eyes?

Against the Holy One of Israel!

According to the account in 2 Kings 19 (and its derivative account in 2 Chronicles 32) an angel of God fell on the Assyrian army and slew 185,000 of its men in one night. "Like Xerxes in Greece, Sennacherib never recovered from the shock of the disaster in Judah. He made no more expeditions against either Judea or Egypt."

The remaining years of Hezekiah's reign were peaceful. Isaiah probably lived to its close, and possibly into the reign of Manasseh. The time and manner of his death are not specified in either the Hebrew Bible (Tanakh) or other primary sources. The Talmud says that he suffered martyrdom by being sawn in two under the orders of Manasseh.

The book of Isaiah, and the book of the prophet Jeremiah, are distinctive in the Hebrew Bible for their direct portrayal of the "wrath of the LORD" as presented, for example, in Isaiah 9:19 stating "Through the wrath of the LORD of hosts is the land darkened, and the people shall be as the fuel of the fire."

== In Judaism ==
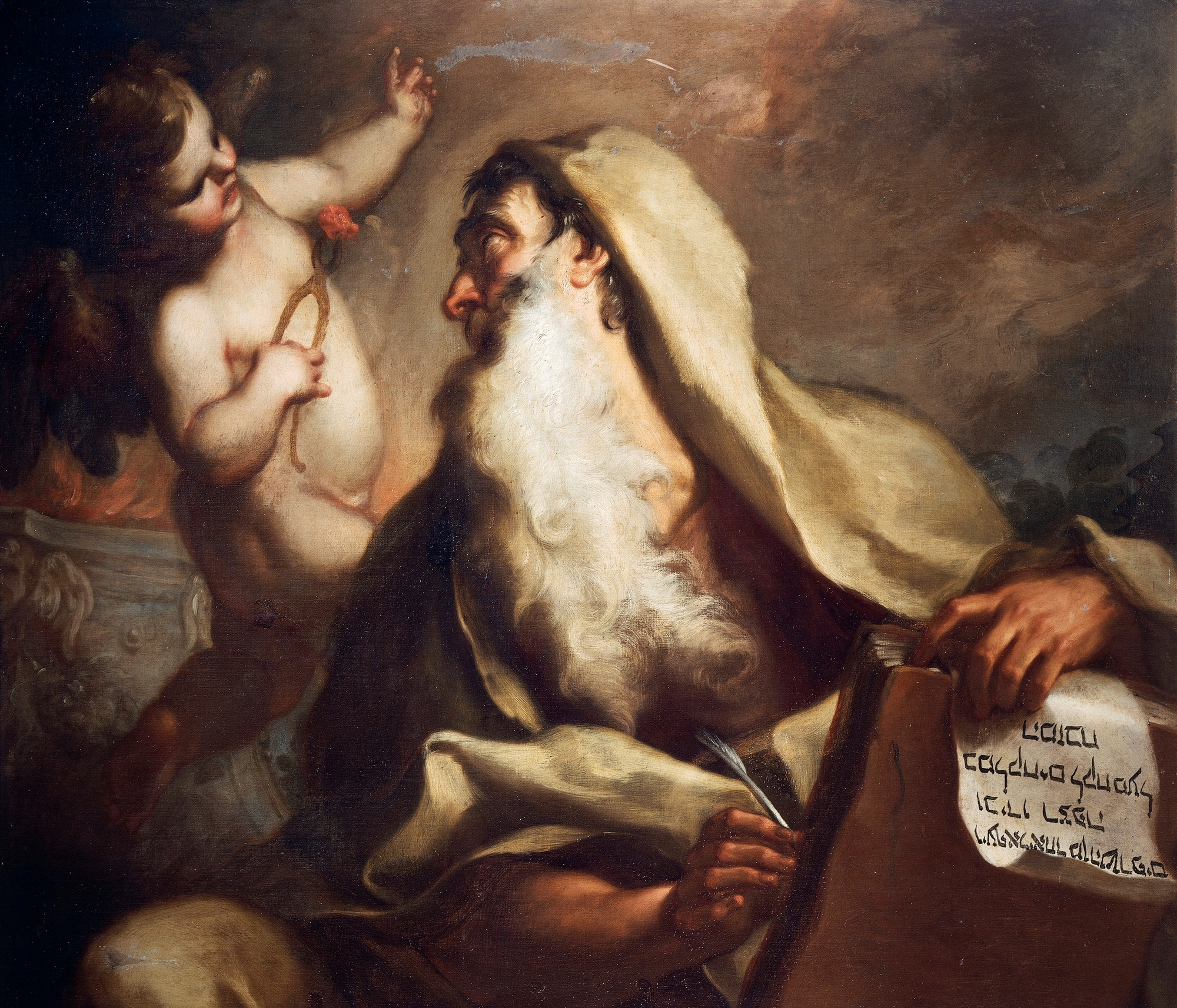
Painting of Isaiah by Antonio Balestra

In addition to Isaiah’s origination in Judaism’s Hebrew Bible Book of Isaiah, references to the Israelite prophet in Jewish rabbinic literature contain various expansions, elaborations, and inferences.

=== Origin and calling ===
According to the ancient rabbis, Isaiah was a descendant of Judah and Tamar, and his father Amoz was the brother of King Amaziah.

While Isaiah, says the Midrash, was walking up and down in his study he heard God saying "Whom shall I send?" Then Isaiah said "Here am I; send me!" Thereupon God said to him, "My children are troublesome and sensitive; if you are ready to be insulted and even beaten by them, you may accept My message; if not, you would better renounce it". Isaiah accepted the mission, and was the most forbearing, as well as the most patriotic, among the prophets, always defending Israel and imploring forgiveness for its sins. When Isaiah said "I dwell in the midst of a people of unclean lips", he was rebuked by God for speaking in such terms of His people.

Further accounts state that Isaiah was actually the maternal grandfather of King Manasseh, which would make Queen Consort Hephzibah from 2 Kings 21:1 his daughter and King Hezekiah his son-in-law. Hephzibah's name (lit. 'my delight (is) in her') was used as a symbolic name for Zion following its restoration to the favor of Yahweh in Isaiah 62.

=== His death ===
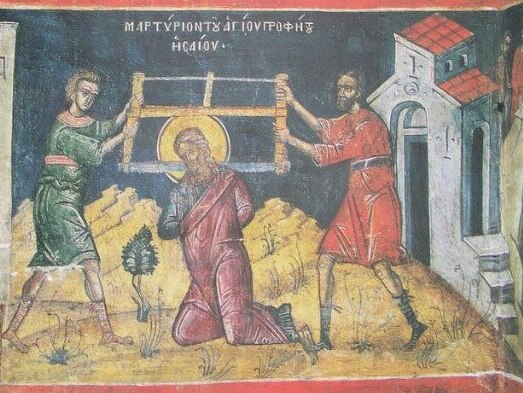
Fresco from Dionysiou Monastery

It is related in the Talmud that Rabbi Simeon ben Azzai found in Jerusalem an account wherein it was written that King Manasseh killed Isaiah. King Manasseh said to Isaiah "Moses, your master, said 'No man may see God and live'; but you have said 'I saw the Lord seated upon his throne'"; and went on to point out other contradictions—as between Deuteronomy and Isaiah 40; between Exodus 33 and 2 Kings Isaiah thought: "I know that he will not accept my explanations; why should I increase his guilt?" He then uttered the tetragrammaton, a cedar-tree opened, and Isaiah disappeared within it. King Manasseh ordered the cedar to be sawn asunder, and when the saw reached his mouth Isaiah died; thus was he punished for having said "I dwell in the midst of a people of unclean lips".

A somewhat different version of this legend is given in the Jerusalem Talmud. According to that version Isaiah, fearing King Manasseh, hid himself in a cedar-tree, but his presence was betrayed by the fringes of his garment, and King Manasseh caused the tree to be sawn in half. A passage of the Targum to Isaiah quoted by Jolowicz states that when Isaiah fled from his pursuers and took refuge in the tree, and the tree was sawn in half, the prophet's blood spurted forth. The legend of Isaiah's martyrdom spread to the Arabs and to the Christians as, for example, Athanasius the bishop of Alexandria (c. 318) wrote, "Isaiah was sawn asunder".

== In Christianity ==
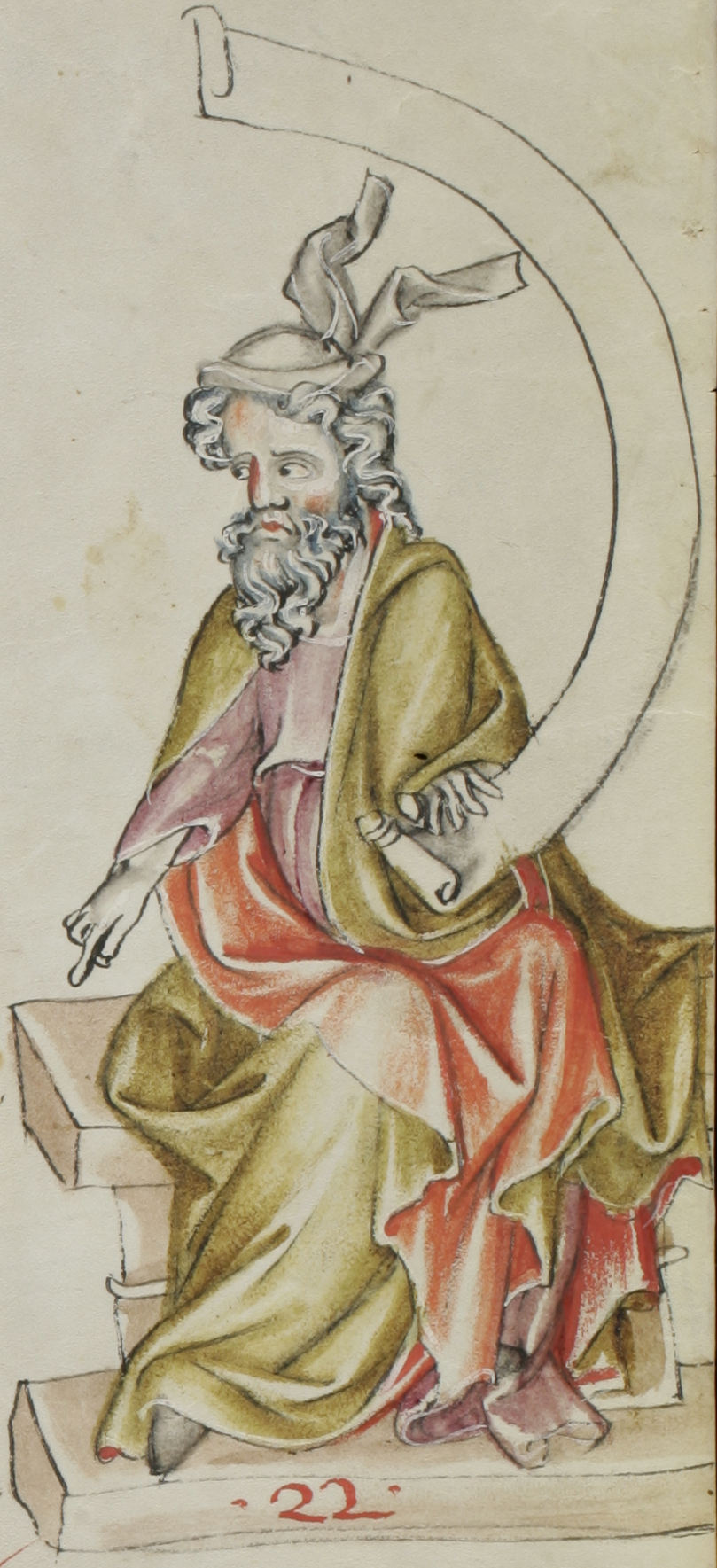
Representation of the Prophet Isaiah illustrating a 14th-century prose translation of the Gospels

The Ascension of Isaiah, a pseudepigraphical Christian text dated to sometime between the end of the 1st century and the beginning of the 3rd, gives a detailed story of Isaiah confronting an evil false prophet and ending with Isaiah being martyred – none of which is attested in the original Biblical account.

Gregory of Nyssa (c. 335–395) believed that the Prophet Isaiah "knew more perfectly than all others the mystery of the religion of the Gospel". Jerome (c. 342–420) also lauds the Prophet Isaiah, saying "He was more of an Evangelist than a Prophet, because he described all of the Mysteries of the Church of Christ so vividly that you would assume he was not prophesying about the future, but rather was composing a history of past events." Of specific note are the songs of the Suffering Servant, which Christians say are a direct prophetic revelation of the nature, purpose, and detail of the death of Jesus Christ.

The Book of Isaiah is quoted many times by New Testament writers. The Gospel of John says that Isaiah "saw Jesus' glory and spoke about him."

The Eastern Orthodox Church celebrates Saint Isaiah the Prophet with Saint Christopher on May 9. Isaiah is also listed on the page of saints for May 9 in the Roman martyrology of the Roman Catholic Church.

=== In the Book of Mormon ===
The Book of Mormon quotes Jesus Christ as stating that "great are the words of Isaiah", and that all things prophesied by Isaiah have been and will be fulfilled. The Book of Mormon and Doctrine and Covenants also quote Isaiah more than any other prophet from the Hebrew Bible. Additionally, members of the Church of Jesus Christ of Latter-day Saints consider the founding of the church by Joseph Smith in the 19th century to be a fulfillment of Isaiah 11, the translation of the Book of Mormon to be a fulfillment of Isaiah 29, and the building of Latter-day Saint temples as a fulfillment of Isaiah 2:2.

== In Islam ==
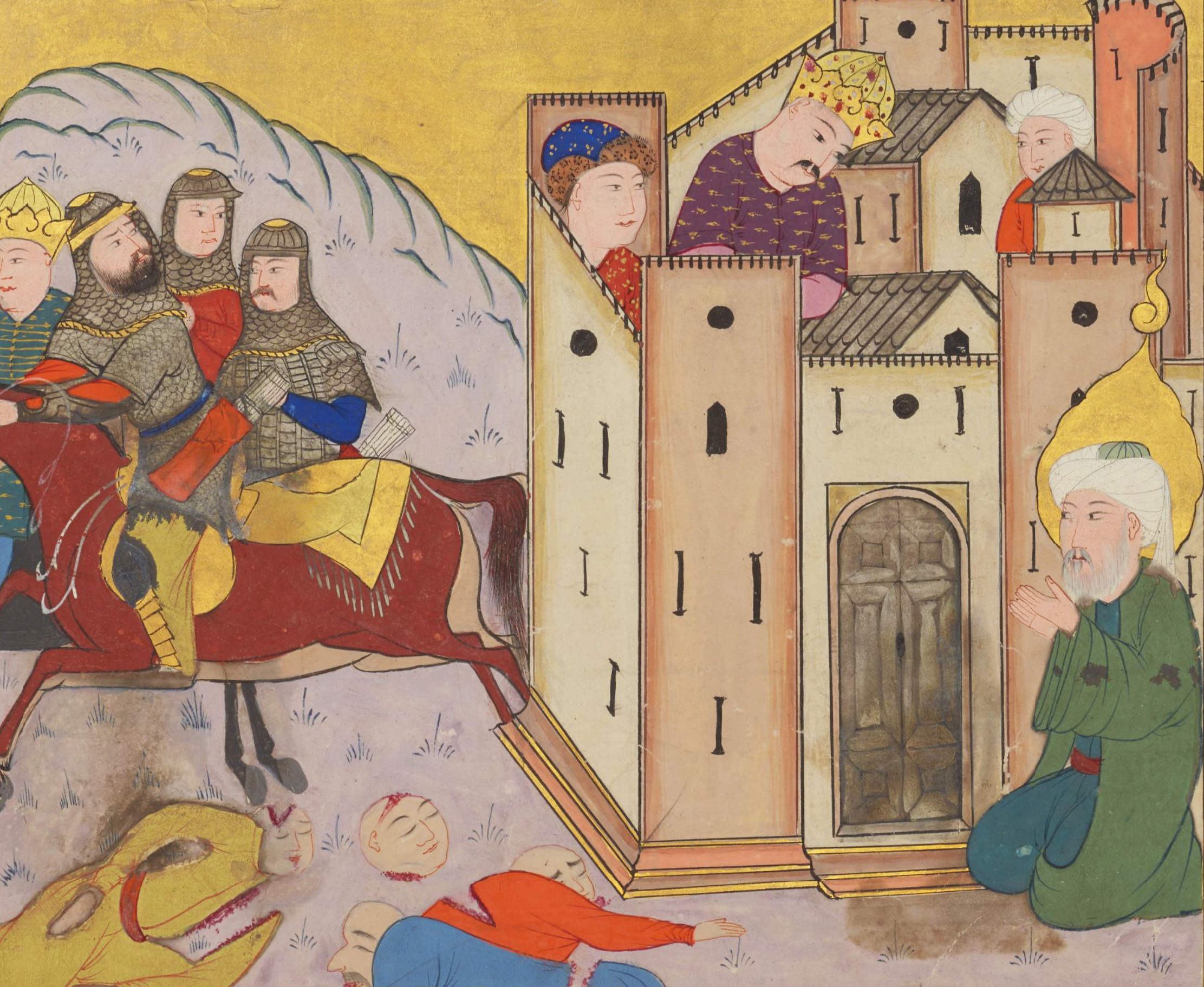
Illustration of a 1585-1590 Ottoman manuscript depicting the victorious Islamic prophet Isha'ya kneeling in prayer as he defeats Sennacherib.

Isaiah (Arabic: إِشَعْيَاء, romanized: Ishaʿyāʾ) is not mentioned by name in the Quran or the Hadith, but appears frequently as a prophet in Muslim sources such as the qiṣaṣ al-anbiyāʾ and various tafsirs. Al-Tabari (310/923) provides the typical accounts for Islamic traditions regarding Isaiah. He is listed among the prophets in the book of salawat Dalail al-Khayrat. He is further mentioned and accepted as a prophet by other Islamic scholars such as ibn Kathir, Abu Ishaq al-Tha'labi and al-Kisa'i and also modern scholars such as Muhammad Asad and Abdullah Yusuf Ali.

According to Muslim scholars, Isaiah prophesied the coming of Jesus and Muhammad, although the claim is disputed by other religious scholars. Isaiah's narrative in Islamic literature can be divided into three sections. The first establishes Isaiah as an Israelite prophet of Judea during the reign of Hezekiah; the second relates Isaiah's actions during the siege of Jerusalem in 597 BC by Sennacherib; and the third warns the nation of coming doom. Paralleling the Hebrew Bible, Islamic tradition states that Hezekiah was king in Jerusalem during Isaiah's time. Hezekiah heard and obeyed Isaiah's advice, but could not quell the turbulence in Israel. This tradition maintains that Hezekiah was a righteous man and that the turbulence worsened after him. After the death of the king, Isaiah told the people not to forsake God, and warned Israel to cease from its persistent sin and disobedience. Muslim tradition maintains that the unrighteous of Judea in their anger sought to kill Isaiah.

In a death resembling the one found in Lives of the Prophets, Muslim exegesis recounts Isaiah's martyrdom by Israelites sawing him asunder.

In the courts of al-Ma'mun, the seventh Abbasid caliph, Ali al-Ridha, the great-grandson of Muhammad and prominent scholar of his era, was questioned by the Exilarch to prove through the Torah that both Jesus and Muhammad were prophets. Among his several proofs, al-Ridha references the Book of Isaiah, stating "Sha'ya (Isaiah), the Prophet, said in the Torah concerning what you and your companions say 'I have seen two riders to whom (He) illuminated earth. One of them was on a donkey and the other was on a camel. Who is the rider of the donkey, and who is the rider of the camel?'" The Exilarch was unable to answer with certainty. Al-Ridha goes on to state that "As for the rider of the donkey, he is 'Isa (Jesus); and as for the rider of the camel, he is Muhammad, may Allah bless him and his family. Do you deny that this (statement) is in the Torah?" The Rabbi responds "No, I do not deny it."

== Archaeology ==
In February 2018, archaeologist Eilat Mazar announced that she and her team had discovered a small seal impression which reads "[belonging] to Isaiah nvy" (could be reconstructed and read as "[belonging] to Isaiah the prophet") during the Ophel excavations, just south of the Temple Mount in Jerusalem. The tiny bulla was found "only 10 feet away" from where an intact bulla bearing the inscription "[belonging] to King Hezekiah of Judah" was discovered in 2015 by the same team. Although the name "Isaiah" in the Paleo-Hebrew alphabet is unmistakable, the damage on the bottom left part of the seal causes difficulties in confirming the word "prophet" or a name "Navi", casting some doubts whether this seal really belonged to the prophet Isaiah.
