= Hezekiah =

King of Judah

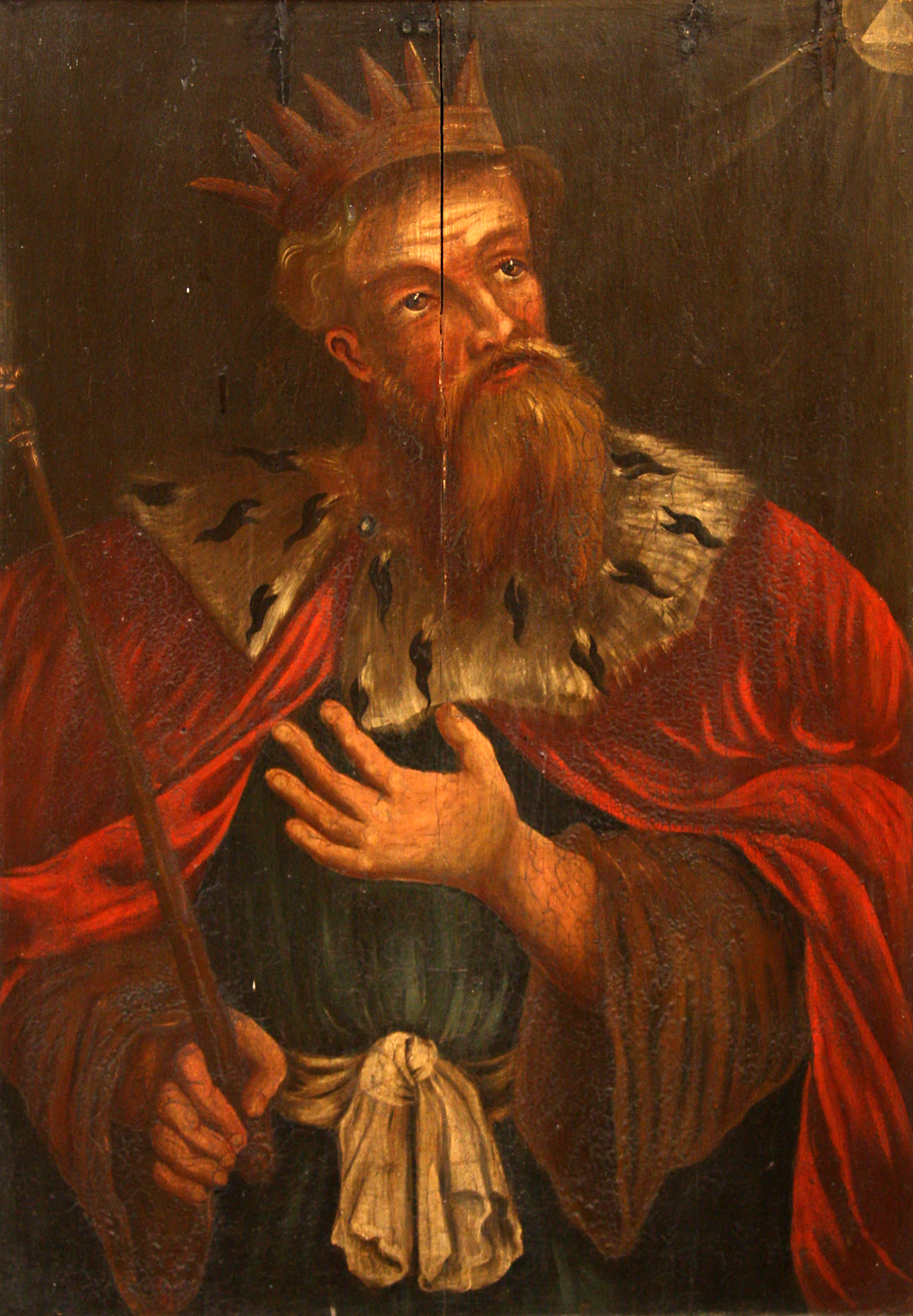
- King Hezekiah on a painting by unknown artist in the choir of St. Mary's Church, Åhus, 17th century

King of Judah
- Reign: Uncertain, reign ended c. 687 BCE (Note: Several different theories regarding the dates of Hezekiah's reign exist, including a coregency with Ahaz 729–716/15 BCE, a sole reign 716/15–697 BCE, and coregency with Manasseh 697–687/86 BCE (?))
- Predecessor: Ahaz
- Successor: Manasseh
- Born: c. 739/41 BCE probably Jerusalem
- Died: c. 687 BCE (aged 51–54) probably Jerusalem
- Burial: Jerusalem
- Spouse: Hephzibah
- Issue: Manasseh; Amariah? (Note: An ancestor of the prophet Zephaniah is listed as "Amariah, son of Hezekiah", but whether or not this Hezekiah is the same individual as the king is unknown.)
- House: House of David
- Father: Ahaz
- Mother: Abijah (also called Abi)

Hezekiah (/ˌhɛzɪˈkaɪ.ə/; born c. 741 BCE, sole ruler c. 716/15–687/86 BCE), also known as Ezekias, (Note: Biblical Hebrew: חִזְקִיָּהוּ, חִזְקִיָּה,יְחִזְקִיָּהוּ, romanized: Ḥizqiyyāhū, Ḥizqiyyā, Yĭḥizqiyyāhū; Akkadian: 𒄩𒍝𒆥𒀀𒌑, romanized: Ḫazaqia'ú, ḫa-za-qi-a-ú; Koine Greek: Ἐζεκίας, Ezekías; Latin: Ezechias; also transliterated as Ḥizkiyyāhu or Ḥizkiyyāh; meaning "Yah shall strengthen") was the son of Ahaz and the thirteenth king of Judah. He is described as "the best-attested figure in biblical history," due to the extensive documentation of his reign in biblical texts and external sources (notably Assyrian inscriptions). His reign was marked by his significant religious reforms and his revolt against the Assyrian Empire. He witnessed the destruction of the northern Kingdom of Israel by the Assyrians under Sargon II in c. 722 BCE and later faced the Assyrian siege of Jerusalem by King Sennacherib in 701 BCE.

Hezekiah's changes to the official Yahweh worship, especially his centralization of worship in Jerusalem and his efforts to rid Judah of the worship of other cult gods and goddesses, are a major focus of biblical accounts. He is considered a very righteous king in both the Second Book of Kings and the Second Book of Chronicles. (Note: In the Septuagint, Vulgate, and other ancient translations, 2 Kings is numbered 4 Kings.) His efforts to consolidate worship around the God of Israel and his destruction of other cult objects, such as the bronze serpent made by Moses, are seen as his way of consolidating power and temple resources during a turbulent time. His reign was marked by prophetic activity, with prophets such as Isaiah and Micah delivering their messages during his time.

While Hezekiah's reign is well-documented, the historical accuracy of the events is debated by scholars. He is also one of the more prominent kings of Judah mentioned in the Bible and is one of the kings mentioned in the genealogy of Jesus in the Gospel of Matthew. He lived another fifteen years after the war and brought material prosperity to his kingdom before he died, and his son Manasseh succeeded him. The Bible praises Hezekiah's reliance on God during the Assyrian siege, claiming divine intervention in Jerusalem's survival; according to 2 Kings 18:5, "No king of Judah, among either his predecessors or his successors, could [...] be compared to him".

== Etymology ==
The name Hezekiah means "Yahweh strengthens" in Hebrew. Alternately it may be translated as "Yahweh is my strength".

== Biblical narrative ==
=== Dating of Biblical chronology ===
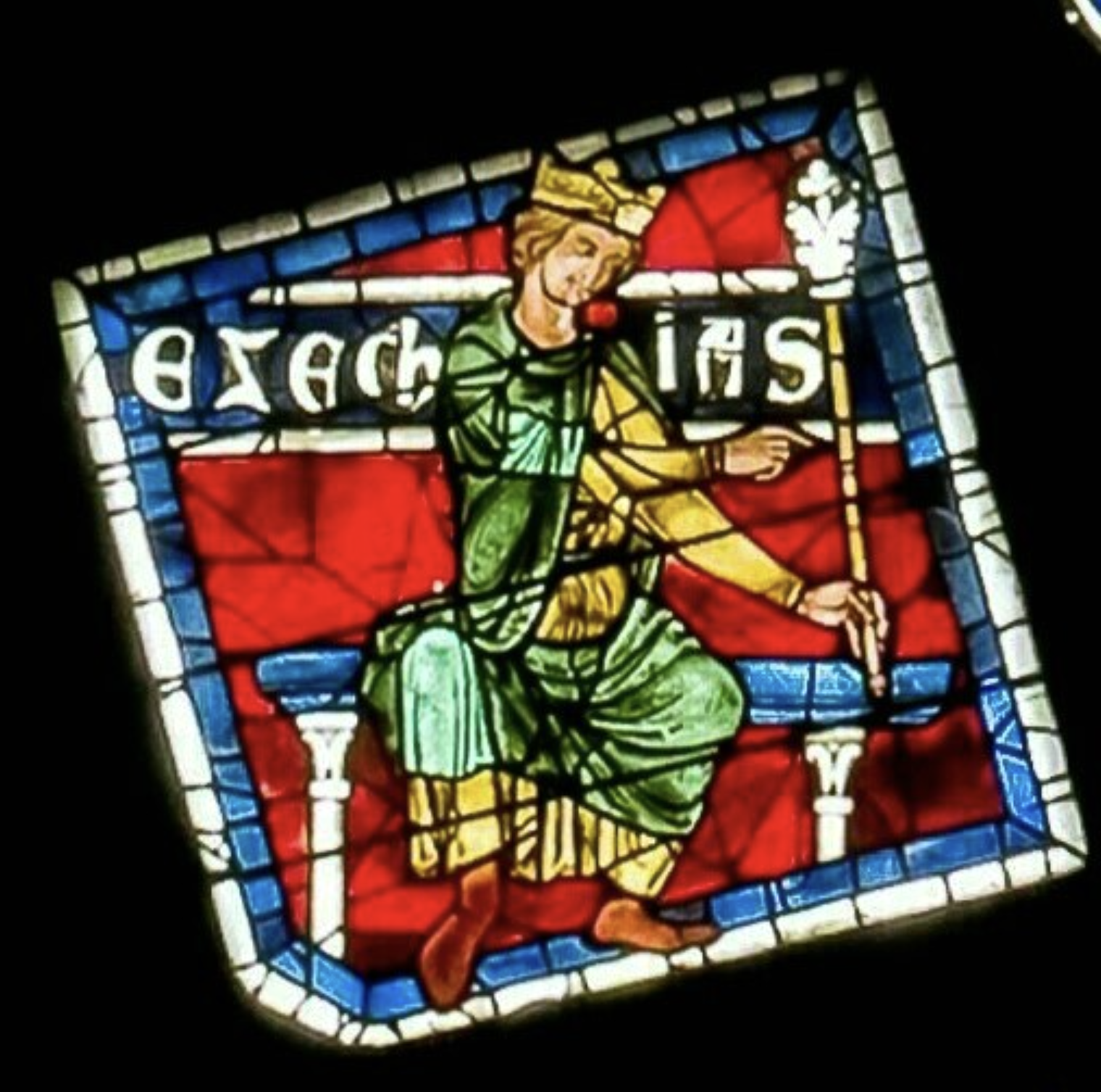
King Hezekiah, from the north rose window of Chartres Cathedral

Based on Edwin R. Thiele's dating, Hezekiah was born in c. 741 BC and died in c. 687 BC at age 54. Thiele and William F. Albright calculated his regnal years, arriving at figures very close to each other, c. 715/16 and 686/87 BC. However, Robb Andrew Young dates his reign to 725–696 BC and Gershon Galil to 726–697/6. The Bible states that the fall of Samaria happened in Hezekiah's 6th year of reign, implying that he would have become king in c. 727 BC. Nadav Na'aman argues that several late 8th century BC seal impressions from the Kaufman collection, which mention some places later destroyed during Sennacherib's invasion and thus predate this event, corroborate this date as the inscriptions in the seal impressions include dates that go up to the 26th regnal year.

=== Family and life ===
According to the Bible, Hezekiah was the son of King Ahaz and Abijah (also called Abi), daughter of the high priest Zechariah. Hezekiah married Hephzibah, died from natural causes in c. 687 BC aged 54, and was succeeded by his son, Manasseh.

=== Reign over Judah ===
According to the Biblical narrative, Hezekiah assumed the throne of Judah at age 25 and reigned for 29 years. Edwin R. Thiele, Leslie McFall, and William F. Albright proposed that Hezekiah served as coregent with his father Ahaz for about 14 years. Albright dates his sole reign as 715–687 BC, and by Thiele as 716–687 BC (the last ten years being a co-regency with his son Manasseh).

=== Restoration of the Temple ===
According to the Bible, Hezekiah purified and repaired Solomon's Temple, purged its idols, and reformed the priesthood. In an effort to abolish idolatry from his kingdom, he destroyed the high places (or bamot) and the "bronze serpent" (or Nehushtan), recorded as being made by Moses, which had become objects of idolatrous worship. In place of the idolatry, Hezekiah centralized the worship of the sole God at the Temple in Jerusalem. He resumed the Passover pilgrimage and the tradition of inviting the tribes of Israel to take part in a Passover festival.

According to 2 Chronicles 30 (but not the parallel account in 2 Kings), Hezekiah sent messengers to Ephraim and Manasseh, inviting them to Jerusalem for a Passover celebration. The messengers were scorned, but a few men of the tribes of Asher, Manasseh, and Zebulun "were humble enough to come" to the city. According to the Biblical account, the Passover was celebrated with great solemnity and such rejoicing as had not been seen in Jerusalem since the days of Solomon. The celebration took place during the second month, Iyar, because not enough priests had consecrated themselves in the first month.

Biblical studies writer H. P. Mathys suggests that Hezekiah, being unable to restore the United Monarchy by political means, used the invitation to the northern tribes as a final religious "attempt to restore the unity of the cult". He notes that this account "is often considered to contain historically reliable elements, especially since negative aspects are also reported on", although he questions the extent to which it may be considered historically reliable.

=== Assyrian invasion ===
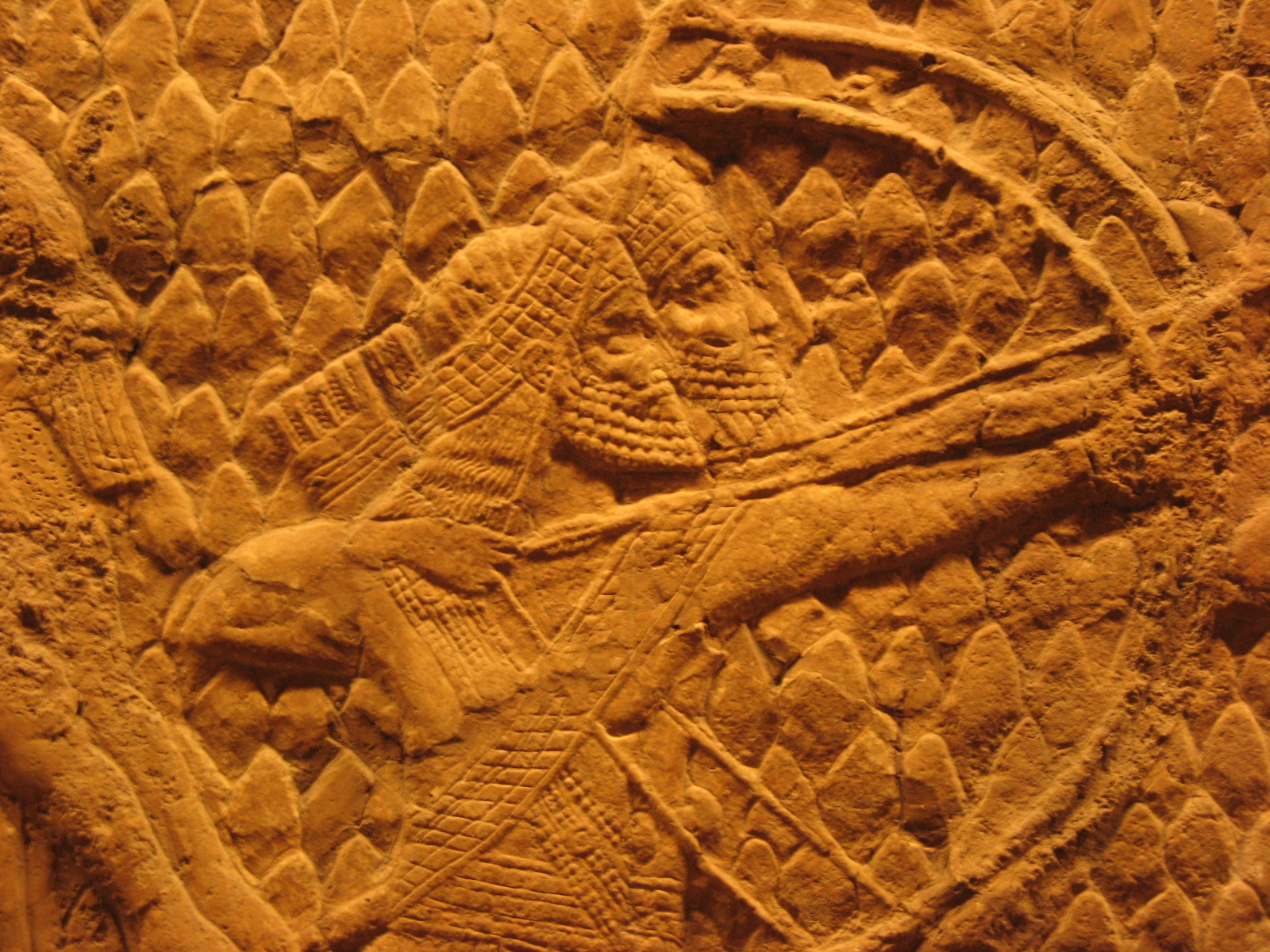
Assyrian archers

In 701 BC, the recently anointed Assyrian king Sennacherib moved to quash a rebellion in the west of his empire, invading Judah and besieging Jerusalem. According to the Bible, Hezekiah did not rely on Egypt for support, but relied on God and prayed to Him for deliverance of his capital city Jerusalem.

The Assyrians recorded that Sennacherib lifted his siege of Jerusalem after Hezekiah paid Sennacherib tribute. The Bible narrates that Hezekiah paid him three hundred talents of silver and thirty of gold as tribute—even sending the doors of the Temple in Jerusalem to produce the promised amount—but, even after the payment was made, Sennacherib renewed his assault on Jerusalem.

=== Hezekiah's construction ===
Knowing that Jerusalem would eventually be subject to a siege, Hezekiah had been preparing for some time by fortifying the capital's walls, building towers, and constructing a tunnel to bring fresh water to the city from a spring outside its walls. The construction of the Siloam Tunnel to help Jerusalem to resist conquest is attributed to Hezekiah.

=== Battle with Sennacherib's army ===
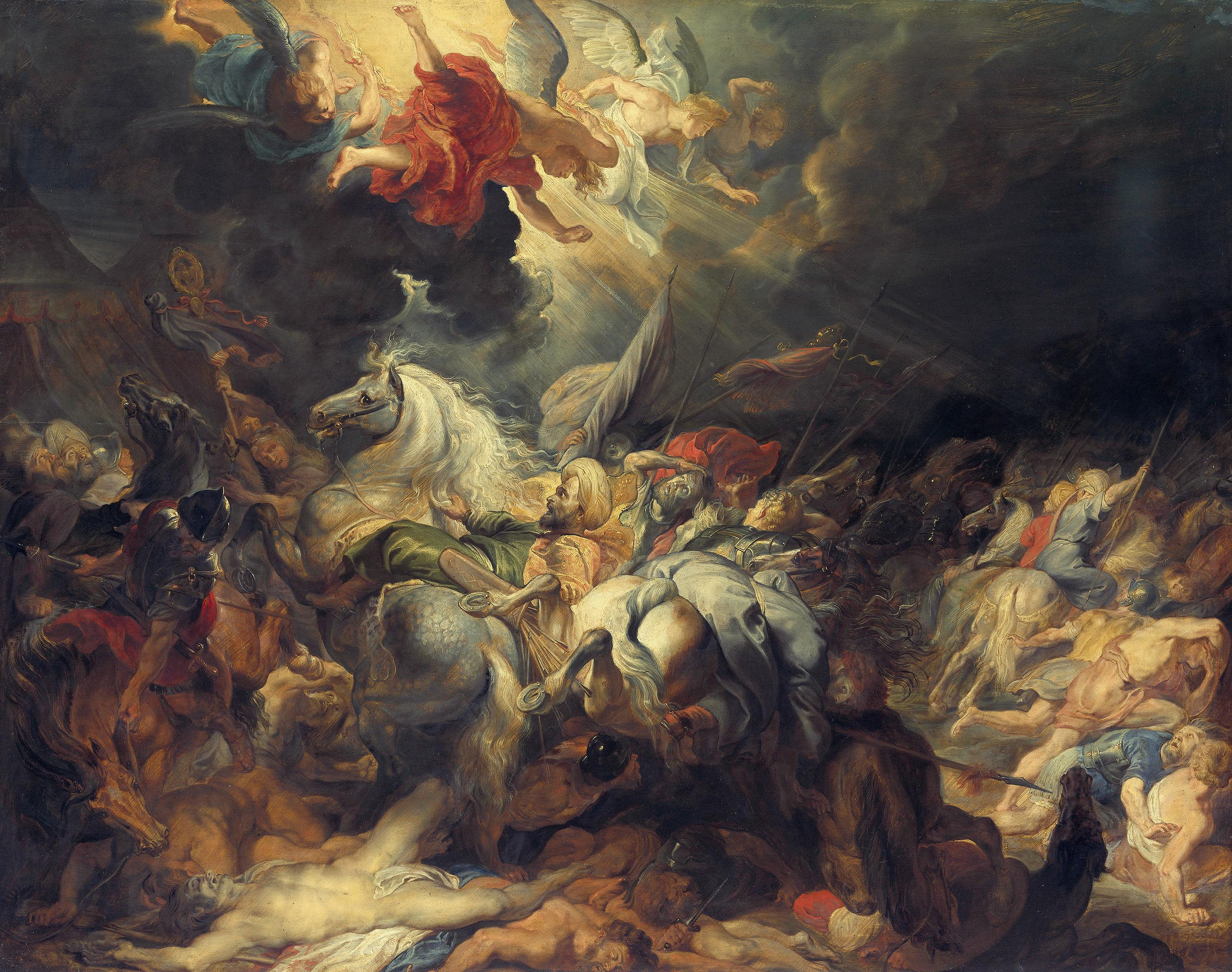
The Defeat of Sennacherib, oil on panel by Peter Paul Rubens, seventeenth century

During the Assyrian siege of Jerusalem, the Bible claims that great losses were inflicted upon the Assyrian army, which Sennacherib's inscriptions do not mention. As Jack Finegan comments: "In view of the general note of boasting which pervades the inscriptions of the Assyrian kings ... it is hardly to be expected that Sennacherib would record such a defeat." The version of the matter that Sennacherib presents, as found inscribed on what is known as the Sennacherib Prism preserved in the University of Chicago Oriental Institute, in part says: "As to Hezekiah, the Jew, he did not submit to my yoke ... Hezekiah himself ... did send me, later, to Nineveh, my lordly city, together with 30 talents of gold, 800 talents of silver".

Herodotus mentions the Assyrian army of Sennacherib being overrun by mice when attacking Egypt. Josephus gives a quote from Berossus that is quite close to the Biblical account.

=== Death of Sennacherib ===
Of Sennacherib's death, 2 Kings records:

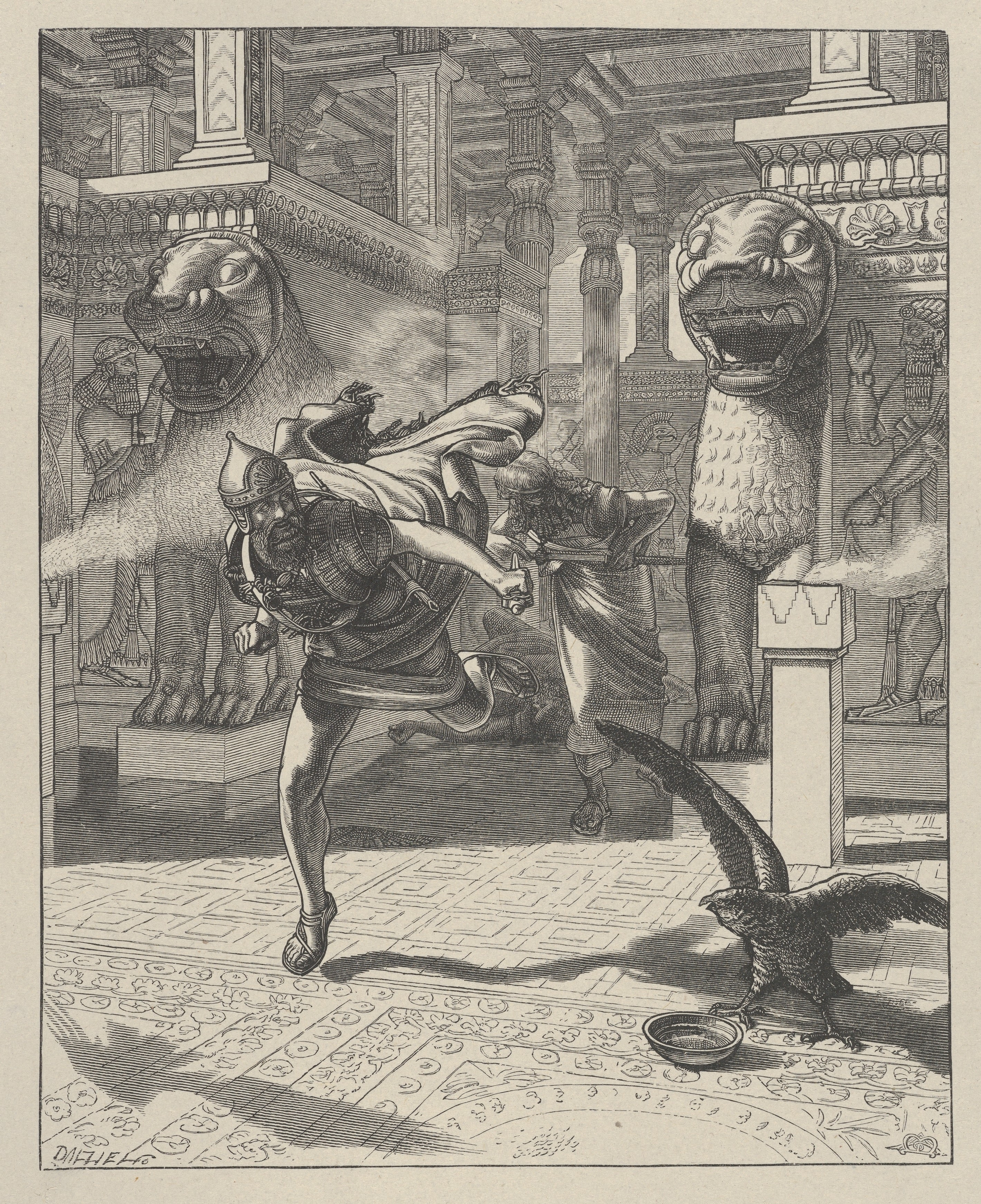
The Flight of Adrammelech, Biblical illustration by Arthur Murch

It came about as he was worshiping in the house of Nisroch his god, that Adrammelech and Sharezer killed him [Sennacherib] with the sword; and they escaped into the land of Ararat. And Esarhaddon his son became king in his place.

According to Assyrian records, Sennacherib was assassinated in 681 BC, twenty years after the 701 BC invasion of Judah. A Neo-Babylonian letter corroborates with the Biblical account, a sentiment from Sennacherib's sons to assassinate him, an event Assyriologists have reconstructed as historical. The son Arda-Mulissu, who is mentioned in the letter as killing anyone who would reveal his conspiracy, murdered his father in c. 681 BC, and was most likely the Adrammelech in 2 Kings, though Sharezer is not known elsewhere.

Assyriologists posit the murder was motivated by Esarhaddon being chosen as heir to the throne instead of Arda-Mulissu, the next eldest son. Assyrian and Hebrew Biblical history corroborate that Esarhaddon ultimately succeeded the throne. Other Assyriologists assert that Sennacherib was murdered in revenge for his destruction of Babylon, a city sacred to all Mesopotamians, including the Assyrians.

=== Later illness ===
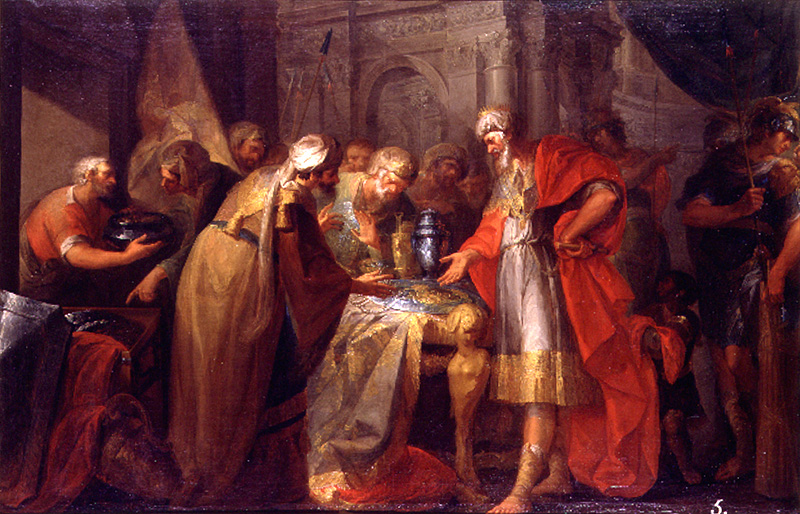
Hezekiah showing off his wealth to envoys of the Babylonian king, oil on canvas by Vicente López Portaña, 1789

Later in his life, the Bible recounts that Hezekiah fell ill. According to the Aggadah in the Talmud, this illness arose from a disagreement between him and Isaiah over who should visit whom, as well as Hezekiah's initial reluctance to marry and have children. Ultimately, Hezekiah did marry Isaiah's daughter. Some Talmudists also considered that it might have come about as a way for Hezekiah to purge his sins or due to his arrogance in assuming his righteousness.

== Extra-biblical records ==
Extra-biblical sources specify Hezekiah by name, along with his reign and influence. "Historiographically, his reign is noteworthy for the convergence of a variety of biblical sources and diverse extrabiblical evidence often bearing on the same events. Significant data concerning Hezekiah appear in the Deuteronomistic History, the Chronicler, Isaiah, Assyrian annals and reliefs, Israelite epigraphy, and, increasingly, stratigraphy". Archaeologist Amihai Mazar calls the tensions between Assyria and Judah "one of the best-documented events of the Iron Age". Hezekiah's story is one of the best to cross-reference with the rest of the Near Eastern world's historical documents.

=== Archaeological record ===
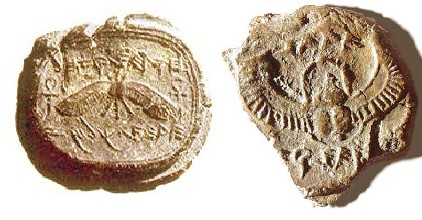
A stamped bulla of King Hezekiah, "Of Hezekiah (son of) Ahaz King of Judah", Israel Museum

Storage jars with the so-called "LMLK seal" may "demonstrate careful preparations to counter Sennacherib's likely route of invasion" and show "a notable degree of royal control of towns and cities which would facilitate Hezekiah's destruction of rural sacrificial sites and his centralization of worship in Jerusalem". Evidence suggests they were used throughout his 29-year reign.

There are some bullae from sealed documents that may have belonged to Hezekiah himself. In 2015, Eilat Mazar discovered a bulla bearing an inscription in ancient Hebrew script that translates as: "Belonging to Hezekiah [son of] Ahaz king of Judah." This is the first seal impression of an Israelite or Judean king to come to light in a scientific archaeological excavation. While another, unprovenanced bulla of King Hezekiah was known, this was the first time a seal impression of Hezekiah had been discovered in situ in the course of actual excavations.

Archaeological findings like the Hezekiah seal led scholars to surmise that the ancient Judahite kingdom had a highly developed administrative system. In 2018, Mazar published a report discussing the discovery of a bulla which she says may have to have belonged to Isaiah. She believes the fragment to have been part of a seal whose complete text might have read "Belonging to Isaiah the prophet." Several other biblical archaeologists, including George Washington University's Christopher Rollston, have pointed to the bulla being incomplete and the present inscription not enough to necessarily refer to the Biblical figure.

==== Increase in the power of Judah ====
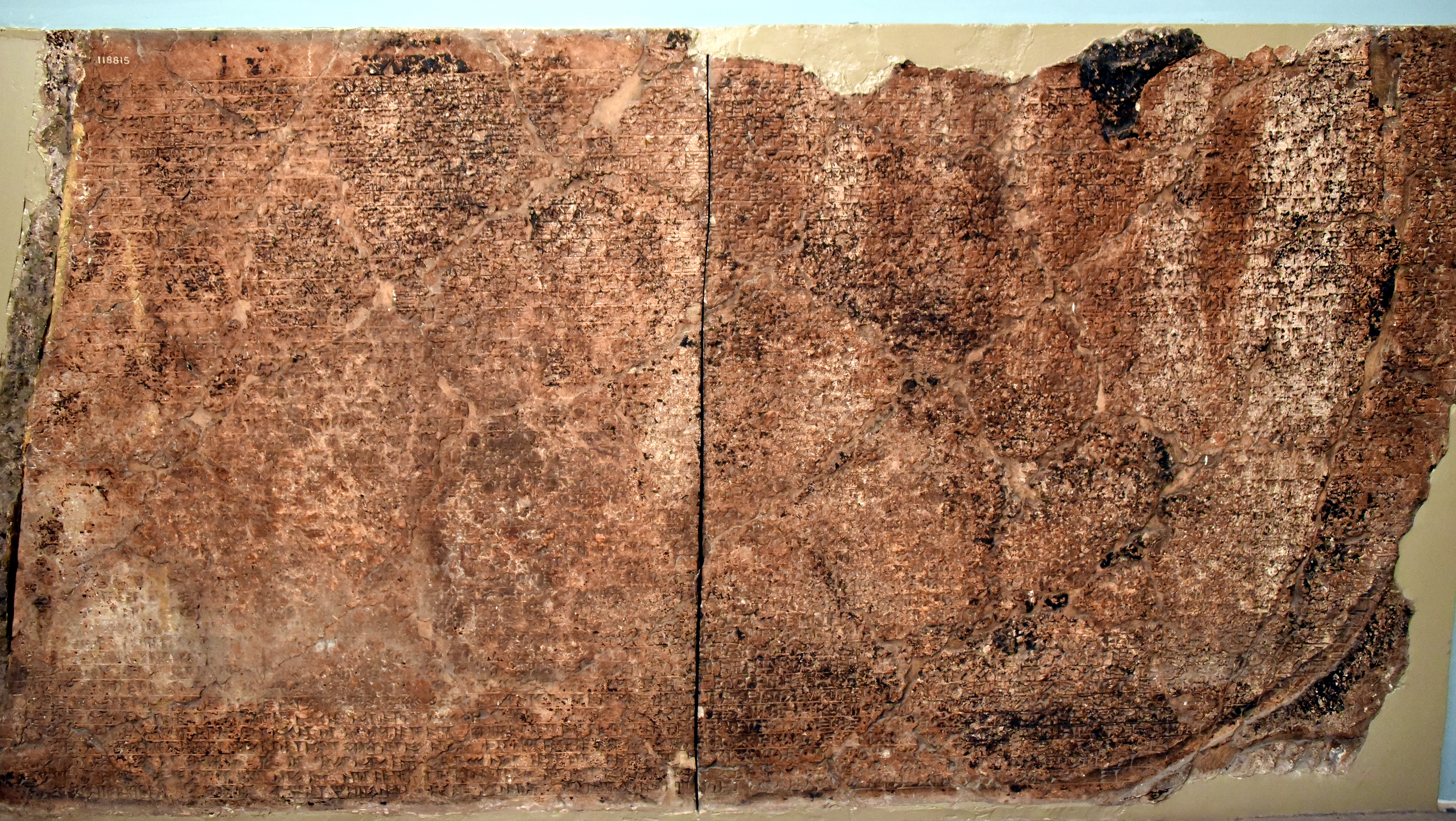
A cuneiform inscription mentioning in detail the tribute sent by Hezekiah, king of Judah, to Sennacherib. The British Museum

According to the work of archaeologists and philologists, the reign of Hezekiah saw a notable increase in the power of the Judean state. At this time, Judah was the strongest nation on the Assyrian–Egyptian frontier. There were increases in literacy and in the production of literary works. The city was enlarged to accommodate a large influx, and Jerusalem's population increased to an estimated 25,000, "five times the population under Solomon." Mazar explains, "Jerusalem was a virtual city-state where the majority of the state's population was concentrated," compared to the rest of Judah's cities.

Archaeologist Israel Finkelstein says, "The key phenomenon—which cannot be explained solely against the background of economic prosperity—was the sudden growth of the population of Jerusalem in particular, and of Judah in general." He says the cause of this growth must be a large influx of Israelites fleeing from the Assyrian destruction of the northern state. It is "[t]he only reasonable way to explain this unprecedented demographic development." This, according to Finkelstein, set the stage for motivations to compile and reconcile Hebrew history into a text at that time. Mazar questions this explanation since, he argues, it is "no more than an educated guess."

The construction of the Broad Wall was traditionally attributed to Hezekiah, but has been found to have occurred decades earlier.

==== Siloam inscription ====
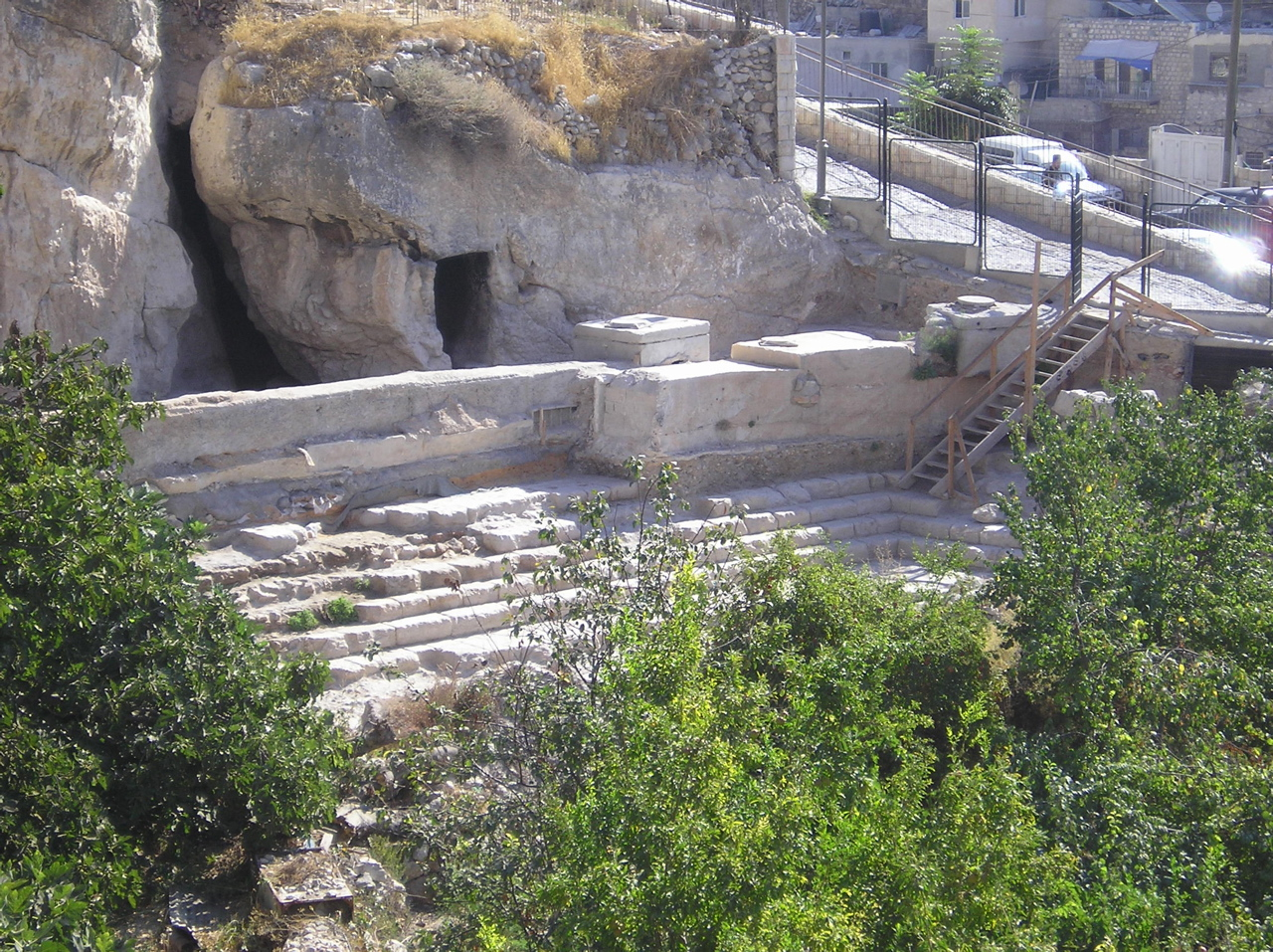
The Siloam pool

The Siloam Tunnel was chiseled through 533 meters (1,750 feet) of solid rock to provide Jerusalem underground access to the waters of the Gihon Spring or Siloam Pool, which lay outside the city.

The Siloam Inscription from the Siloam Tunnel is now in the Istanbul Archaeology Museum. It "commemorates the dramatic moment when the two original teams of tunnelers, digging with picks from opposite ends of the tunnel, met each other". It is "[o]ne of the most important ancient Hebrew inscriptions ever discovered." Finkelstein and Mazar cite this tunnel as an example of Jerusalem's impressive state-level power at the time.

Archaeologists like William G. Dever have pointed at archaeological evidence for the iconoclasm during the period of Hezekiah's reign. The central cult room of the temple at Arad, a royal Judean fortress, was deliberately and carefully dismantled, "with the altars and massebot" concealed "beneath a Str. 8 plaster floor". This stratum correlates with the late 8th century; Dever concludes that "the deliberate dismantling of the temple and its replacement by another structure in the days of Hezekiah is an archeological fact. I see no reason for skepticism here."

==== Lachish relief ====
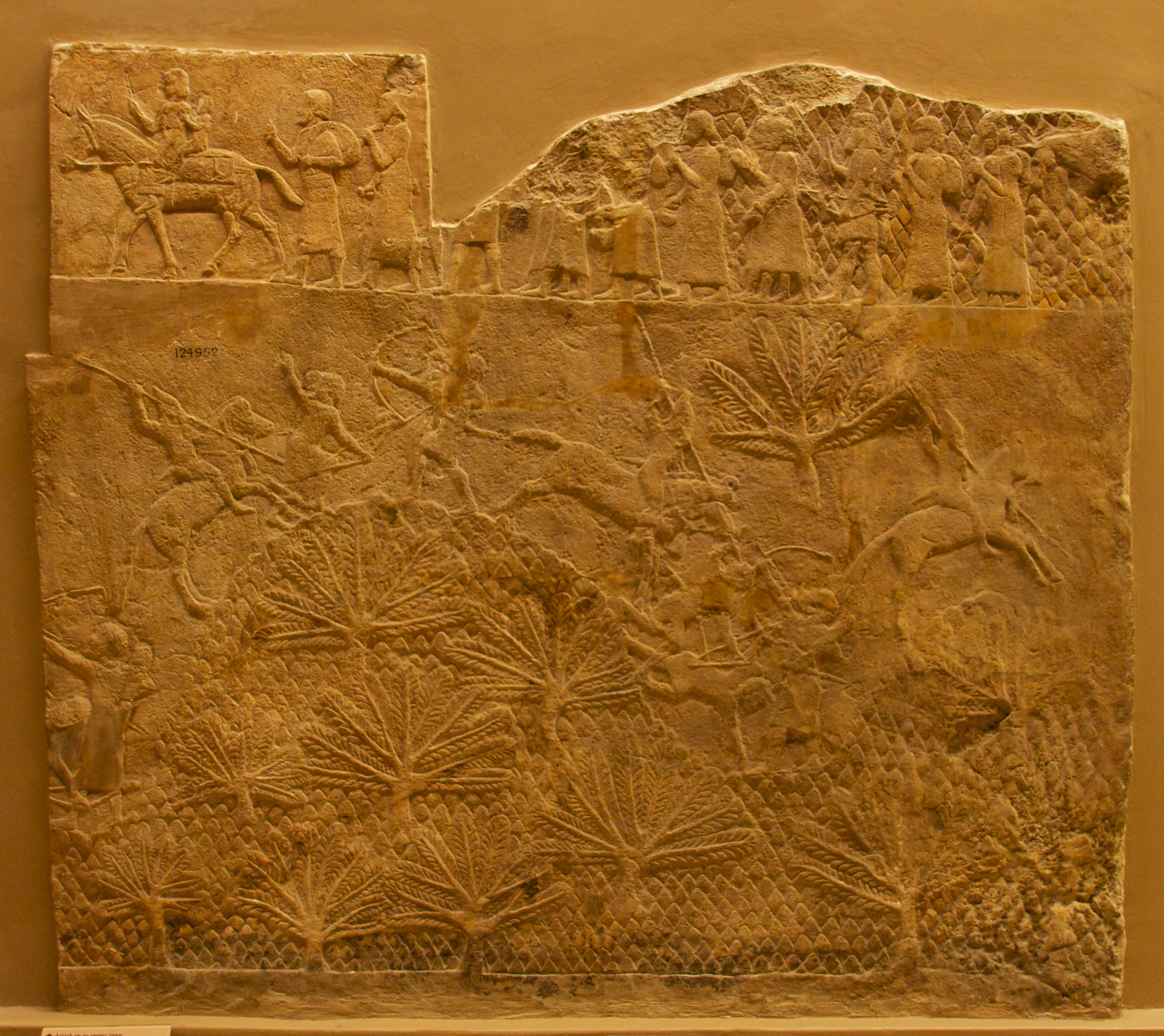
Part of the Lachish Relief, British Museum. Battle scene, showing Assyrian cavalry in action. Above, prisoners are led away.

Under Rehoboam, Lachish became the second-most important city of the kingdom of Judah. During King Hezekiah's revolt against Assyria, Sennacherib captured it despite determined resistance (see Siege of Lachish).

As the Lachish relief attests, Sennacherib began his siege of the city of Lachish in 701 BC. The Lachish Relief graphically depicts the battle and the city's defeat, including Assyrian archers marching up a ramp and Judahites pierced through on mounted stakes. "The reliefs on these slabs" discovered in the Assyrian palace at Nineveh "originally formed a single, continuous work, measuring 8 feet ... tall by 80 feet ... long, which wrapped around the room". Visitors "would have been impressed not only by the magnitude of the artwork itself but also by the magnificent strength of the Assyrian war machine."

==== Sennacherib's Prism of Nineveh ====
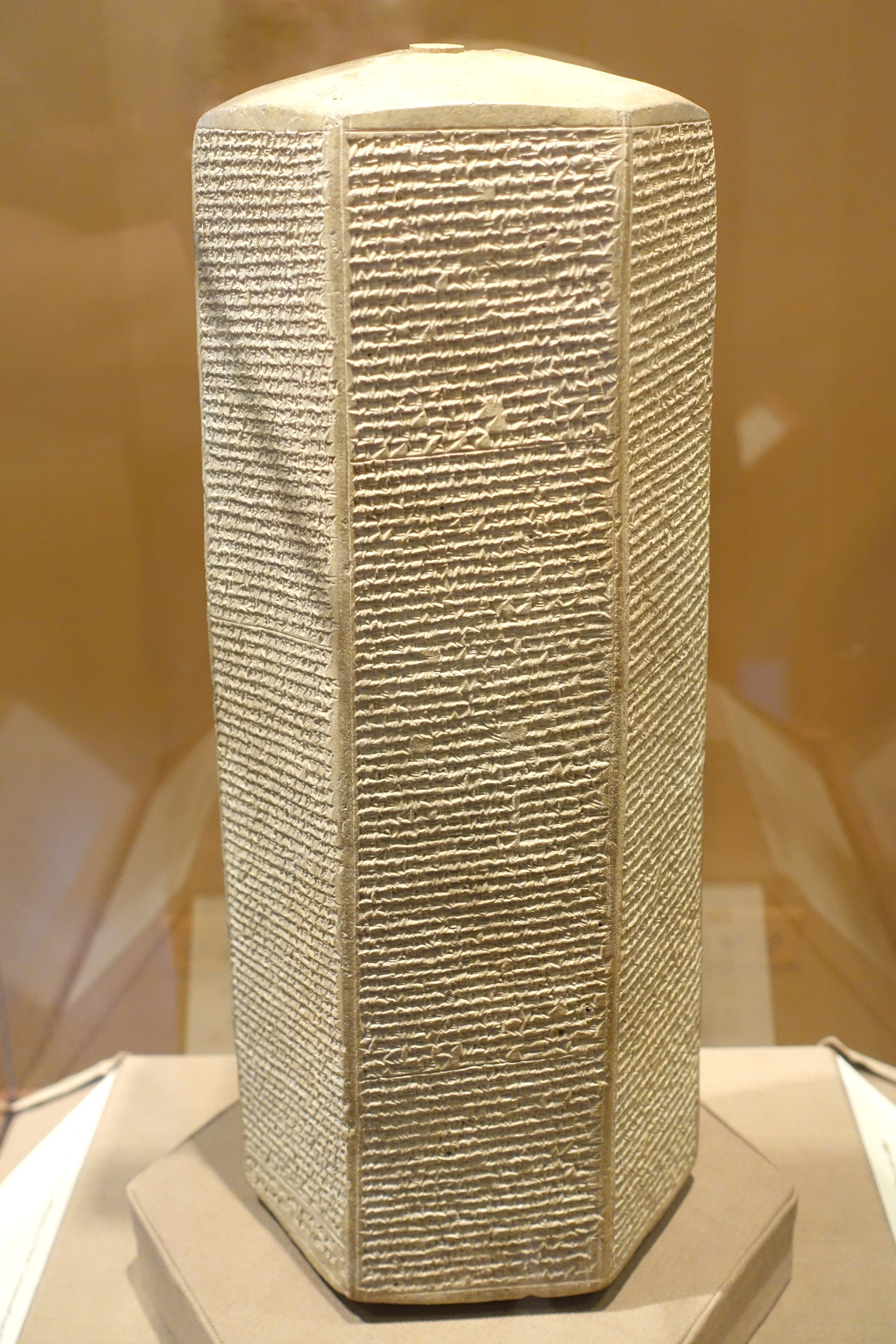
A six-sided clay prism containing narratives of Sennacherib's military campaigns, Oriental Institute Museum of Chicago University

Sennacherib's Prism was found buried in the foundations of the Nineveh palace. It was written in cuneiform, the Mesopotamian form of writing of the day. The prism records the conquest of 46 strong towns and "uncountable smaller places," along with the siege of Jerusalem where Sennacherib says he just "shut him up ... like a bird in a cage," subsequently enforcing a larger tribute upon him.

The Hebrew Bible states that during the night, the angel of YHWH (Hebrew: יהוה) brought death to 185,000 Assyrians troops, forcing the army to abandon the siege. Yet, it also records a tribute paid to Sennacherib of 300 silver talents following the siege. There is no account of the supernatural event in the prism. Sennacherib's account records his levying of a tribute from Hezekiah, a payment of 800 silver talents, which suggests a capitulation to end the siege. However, inscriptions describing Sennacherib's defeat of the Ethiopian forces have been discovered. These say: "As to Hezekiah, the Jew, he did not submit to my yoke, I laid siege to 46 of his strong cities ... and conquered (them). ... Himself I made a prisoner in Jerusalem, his royal residence, like a bird in a cage."

He does not claim to have captured the city. This is consistent with the Bible account of Hezekiah's revolt against Assyria in that neither account indicates that Sennacherib ever entered or formally captured the city. In this inscription, Sennacherib claims that Hezekiah paid for tribute 800 talents of silver, in contrast with the Bible's 300. However, this could be due to boastful exaggeration, which was common among kings of the period. The annals record a list of booty sent from Jerusalem to Nineveh. In the inscription, Sennacherib claims that Hezekiah accepted servitude, and some theorize that Hezekiah remained on his throne as a vassal ruler. The campaign is recorded with differences in the Assyrian records and in the Biblical Books of Kings; there is agreement that the Assyrians have a propensity for exaggeration.

One theory that takes the biblical view posits that a defeat was caused by "possibly an outbreak of the bubonic plague". Another that this is a composite text which makes use of a 'legendary motif' analogous to that of the Exodus story.

- Where the 2 Kings account explains giving 300 talents of silver, Sennacherib's prism records 800 talents. "This discrepancy may be the result of differences in the weight of Assyrian and Israelite silver talents, or it may simply be due to the Assyrian propensity for exaggeration".

=== Other records ===
The Greek historian Herodotus (c. 484 BC – c. 425 BC) wrote of the invasion and acknowledges many Assyrian deaths, which he claims were the result of a plague of mice. The Jewish historian Josephus followed the writings of Herodotus. These historians record Sennacherib's failure to take Jerusalem as "uncontested".

== Historicity ==
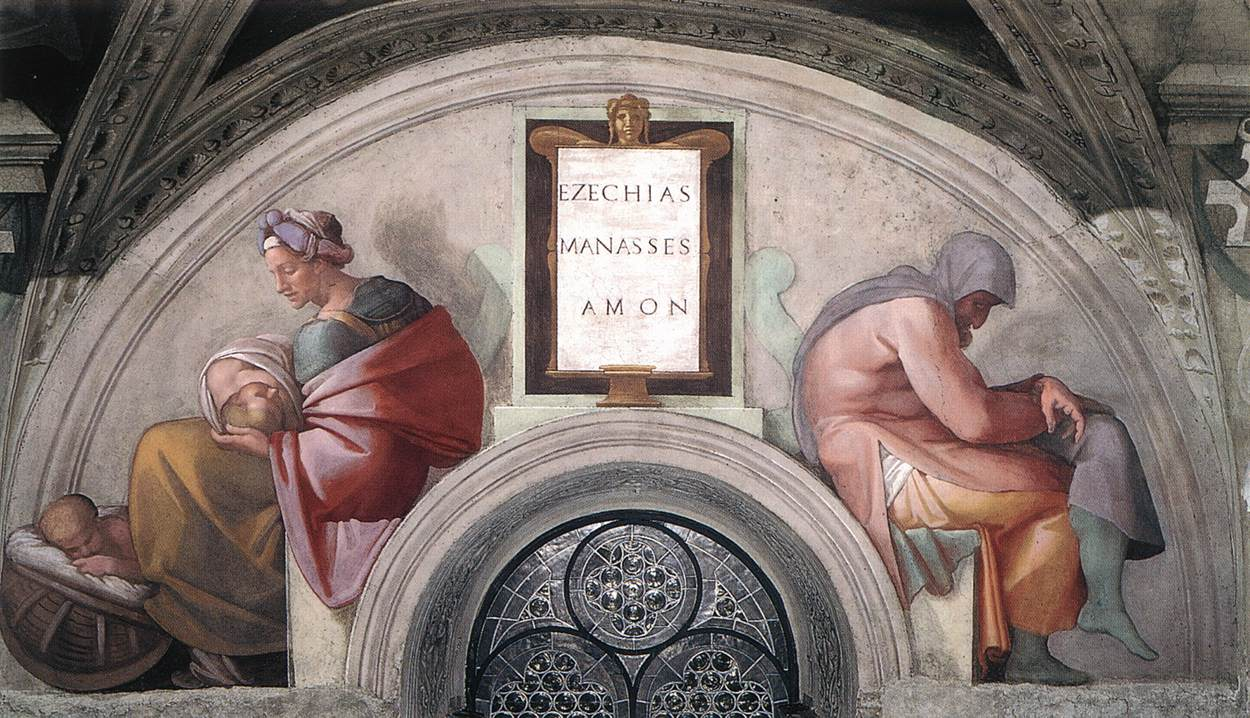
Hezekiah, Manasseh, and Amon, from the Sistine Chapel ceiling

While extrabiblical sources corroborate King Hezekiah's existence, the historicity of some biblical accounts of his reign is debated among scholars, particularly regarding his religious reforms and the Assyrian invasion. While Hezekiah is traditionally credited with centralizing worship in Jerusalem and removing cultic sites, some argue these reforms were influenced by his successor, King Josiah, or may have been more about consolidating royal power than religious overhaul. Other scholars argue that archaeological discoveries at Tel Arad, Beersheba, Tel Motza, Lachish, the City of David and Tel Eton may provide evidence for the existence of Hezekiah's reforms. The biblical account of the Assyrian siege led by King Sennacherib is also contested, with some scholars suggesting exaggeration or blending of multiple events. Disagreements over the chronology of Hezekiah’s reign and the timing of his death further complicate the understanding of his historical legacy, with Assyrian inscriptions and biblical texts remaining key sources in these discussions.

== Role in centralization ==
Modern scholarship has begun to ascribe responsibility of centralization of worship to Hezekiah, rather than Josiah. After the fall of the Northern Kingdom in 722 BCE and the influx of Israelite refugees, centralizing worship in Jerusalem helped unify the kingdom politically and religiously around the Davidic dynasty and Temple. Archaeological evidence supports this: sanctuaries or altars at Tel Arad and Beer-sheba were decommissioned or fell out of use by the late 8th century BCE—before or around Sennacherib’s 701 BCE campaign. These changes predate Josiah by roughly a century.

Sabine Kleiman holds that Hezekiah’s policy seemed more pragmatic than a sweeping religious purge. Sennacherib’s invasion left Judah ruined, with limited resources to maintain regional worship sites. Official state worship activity naturally concentrated in Jerusalem, the only major surviving center. This consolidation strengthened royal control, centralized economic resources (offerings and tithes), and supported state projects like fortifications. Popular or household religion likely continued, but official high-place worship was effectively curtailed by necessity rather than Deuteronomy-style ideology. In Kleiman's view, the biblical authors later framed this practical outcome as pious reform. However, Avraham Faust notes archaeological evidence that some late 8th-century BCE regional worship sites were destroyed before Sennacherib’s invasion, supporting the historicity of a religious reform.

Russel Gmirkin holds that the detailed account of Josiah’s reform described in 2 Kings, triggered by the discovery of the “book of the law,” likely amplifies or retrojects elements of Hezekiah’s achievements. After Manasseh’s long reign, which saw a resurgence of diverse practices according to the biblical narrative, Josiah may have enforced stricter adherence or purged foreign elements, but the core centralization had already occurred. But this may have been part of a post-exilic tradition, as there is no mention of Josiah’s reforms in the books of Jeremiah or Zephaniah, two prophets contemporary to the time of Josiah.

== Rabbinic literature ==
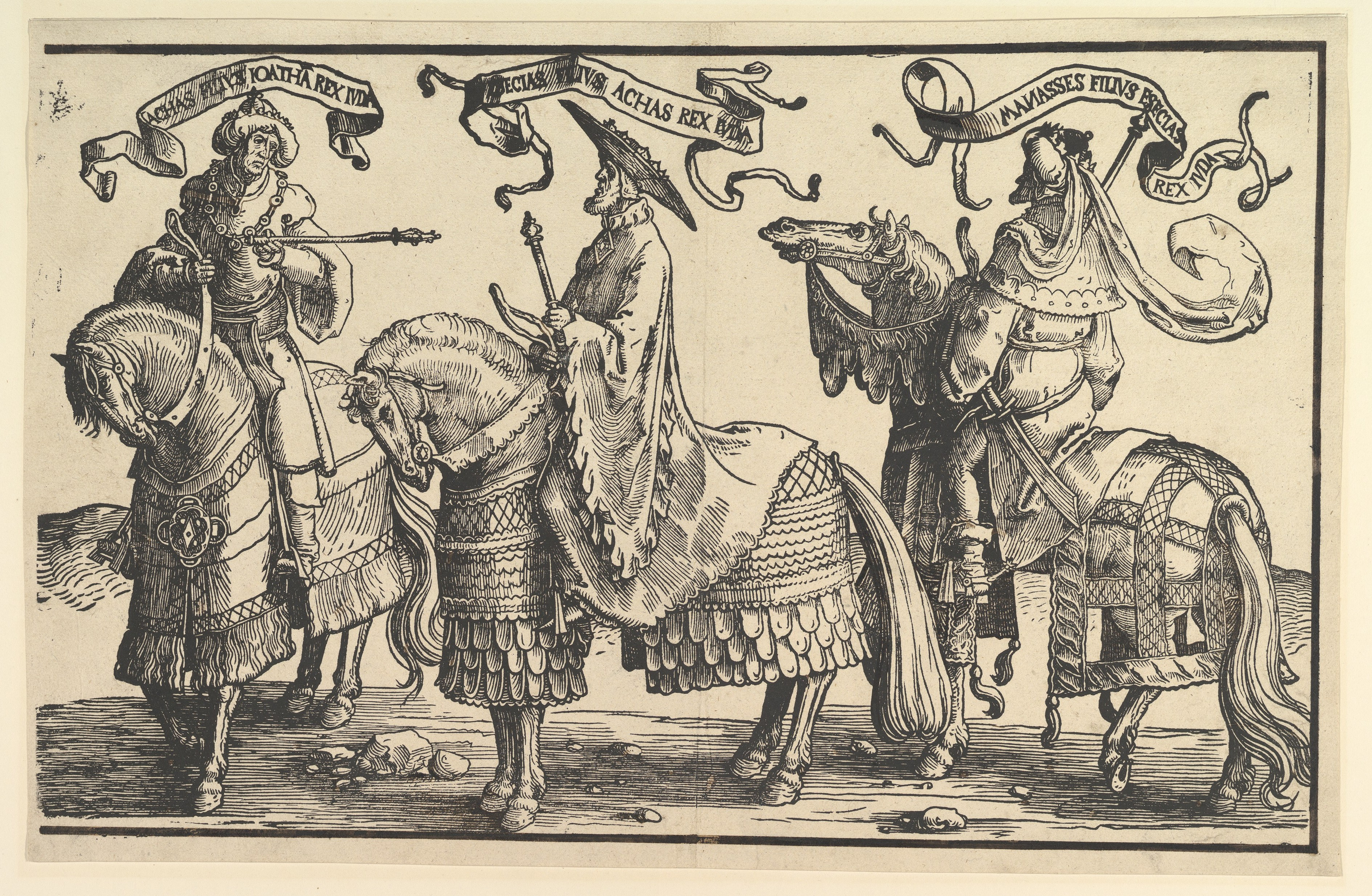
Ahaz, Hezekiah, and Manasseh, by Lucas van Leyden

Abijah saved the life of her son Hezekiah, whom her husband, Ahaz, had designated as an offering to Moloch. By anointing him with the blood of the salamander, she enabled him to pass through the fire of Moloch unscathed (Sanhedrin 63b).

Hezekiah is considered the model of those who put their trust in the Lord. Only during his sickness did he waver in his hitherto unshaken trust and require a sign, for which he was blamed by Isaiah (Lamentations Rabbah 1). The Hebrew name Ḥizḳiyyah is considered by the Talmudists to be a surname, meaning either "strengthened by Yhwh" or "he who made a firm alliance between the Israelites and Yhwh"; his eight other names are enumerated in Isaiah 9:5, according to Sanhedrin 94a. He is called the "restorer of the study of Halakha" in the schools and is said to have planted a sword at the door of the beth midrash, declaring that he who would not study Halakha should be struck with the weapon. As a result, no boy or girl in the kingdom of Judah was unfamiliar with the laws of impurity and purity (Sanhedrin 94b).

Hezekiah's piety, which, according to the Talmudists, alone occasioned the destruction of the Assyrian army and the signal deliverance of the Israelites when Sennacherib attacked Jerusalem, caused him to be considered by some as the Messiah (Sanhedrin 99a). According to Bar Kappara, Hezekiah was destined to be the Messiah, but the attribute of justice (middat ha-din) protested against this, saying that as David, who sang so much of the glory of God, had not been made the Messiah, still less should Hezekiah, for whom so many miracles had been performed (and who did not sing the praise of God). It is also reported that Hezekiah missed this opportunity because he did not sing and give thanks for Sennacherib's downfall.

Menachot 109b tells of Hezekiah encouraging others to keep their faith:

לאחר מפלתו של סנחריב יצא חזקיה ומצא בני מלכים שהיו יושבין בקרונות של זהב הדירו שלא לעבוד עבודת כוכבים "After the fall of Sancheriv, Hezekiah encountered princes sitting in golden wagons [presumably the rich folks getting out of town] he made them promise not to worship stars [i.e., not to engage in idolatry]".

The Talmudists attribute to Hezekiah the redaction of the books of Isaiah, Proverbs, Song of Solomon, and Ecclesiastes in Bava Batra 15a.

== Chronological interpretation ==
Understanding the biblically recorded sequence of events in Hezekiah's life as chronological or not is critical to the contextual interpretation of his reign. According to scholar Stephen L. Harris, chapter 20 of 2 Kings does not follow the events of chapters 18 and 19. Rather, the Babylonian envoys precede the Assyrian invasion and siege. Chapter 20 would have been added during the exile, and Harris says it "evidently took place before Sennacherib's invasion" when Hezekiah was "trying to recruit Babylon as an ally against Assyria." Consequently, "Hezekiah ends his long reign impoverished and ruling over only a tiny scrap of his former domain."

Likewise, the Archaeological Study Bible says, "The presence of these riches' that Hezekiah shows to the Babylonians "indicates that this event took place before Hezekiah's payment of tribute to Sennacherib in 701 BCE". Again, "though the king's illness and the subsequent Babylonian mission are described at the end of the accounts of his reign, they must have occurred before the war with Assyria.

=== Academic debate ===
There has been considerable academic debate about the actual dates of the Israelite kings' reigns. Scholars have endeavored to synchronize the chronology of events in the Hebrew Bible with those derived from other external sources. In the case of Hezekiah, scholars have noted that the apparent inconsistencies are resolved by accepting the evidence that Hezekiah, like his predecessors for four generations in the kings of Judah, had a coregency with his father, and this coregency began in 729 BCE.

As an example of the reasoning that finds inconsistencies in calculations when co-regencies are a priori ruled out, 2 Kings 18:10 dates the fall of Samaria (the Northern Kingdom) to the 6th year of Hezekiah's reign. Albright has dated the fall of the Kingdom of Israel to 721 BCE, while Thiele calculates the date as 723 BCE. If Albright's or Thiele's dating is correct, Hezekiah's reign would begin in 729 or 727 BCE. On the other hand, 2 Kings 18:13 states that Sennacherib invaded Judah in the 14th year of Hezekiah's reign. Dating based on Assyrian records date this invasion to 701 BCE, and Hezekiah's reign would therefore begin in 716/715 BCE.

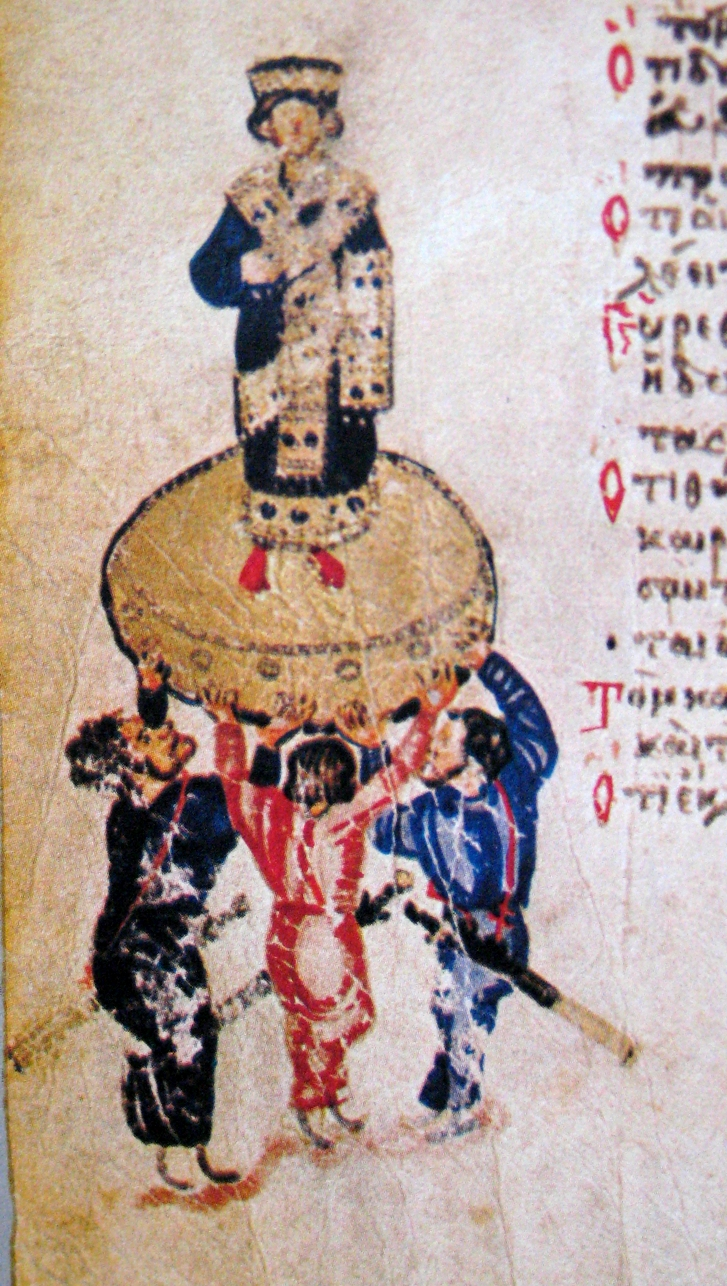
A miniature from the Chludov Psalter

Since Albright and Friedman, several scholars have explained these dating problems based on a coregency between Hezekiah and his father Ahaz between 729 and 716/715 BCE. Assyriologists and Egyptologists recognize that coregency was a practice both in Assyria and Egypt. After noting that coregencies were only used sporadically in the northern kingdom (Israel), Nadav Na'aman writes,

In the kingdom of Judah, on the other hand, the nomination of a co-regent was the common procedure, beginning from David who, before his death, elevated his son Solomon to the throne. When taking into account the permanent nature of the co-regency in Judah from the time of Joash, one may dare to conclude that dating the co-regencies accurately is indeed the key for solving the problems of biblical chronology in the eighth century BCE.

Among the numerous scholars who have recognized the coregency between Ahaz and Hezekiah is Kenneth Kitchen in his various writings, Leslie McFall, and Jack Finegan. McFall, in his 1991 article, argues that if 729 BCE—that is, the Judean regnal year beginning in Tishri of 729—is taken as the start of the Ahaz/Hezekiah coregency, and 716/715 BCE as the date of the death of Ahaz, then all the extensive chronological data for Hezekiah and his contemporaries in the late eighth century BCE are in harmony. Further, McFall found that no textual emendations are required among the numerous dates, reign lengths, and synchronisms given in the Hebrew Bible for this period.

Scholars who accept the principle of coregencies note that abundant evidence for their use is found in the Biblical material itself. The agreement of scholarship built on these principles with both Biblical and secular texts was such that the Thiele/McFall chronology was accepted as the best chronology for the kingdom period in Jack Finegan's encyclopedic Handbook of Biblical Chronology.

== See also ==
- List of biblical figures identified in extra-biblical sources

== Notes ==
Hezekiah of Judah House of David
Regnal titles
Preceded by Ahaz	King of Judah; Coregent: 729–716 BCE; Sole reign: 716–697 BCE; Coregent: 697–687 BCE	Succeeded by Manasseh
