= Manasseh of Judah =

Fourteenth king of the Kingdom of Judah

Manasseh
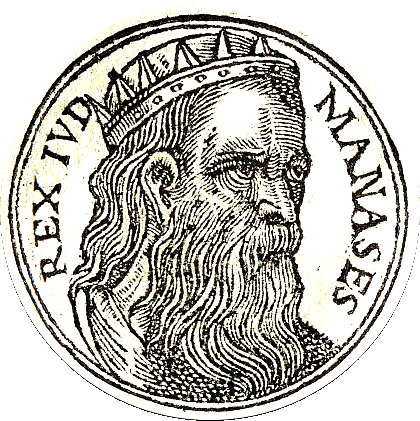

King of Judah
- Reign: 55 years total 697–687 BC coregency 687–643 BC sole reign
- Predecessor: Hezekiah
- Successor: Amon
- Born: c. 709 BC probably Jerusalem
- Died: c. 643 BC (aged 65 or 66) probably Jerusalem
- Spouse: Meshullemeth
- Issue: Amon
- House: House of David
- Father: Hezekiah
- Mother: Hephzibah

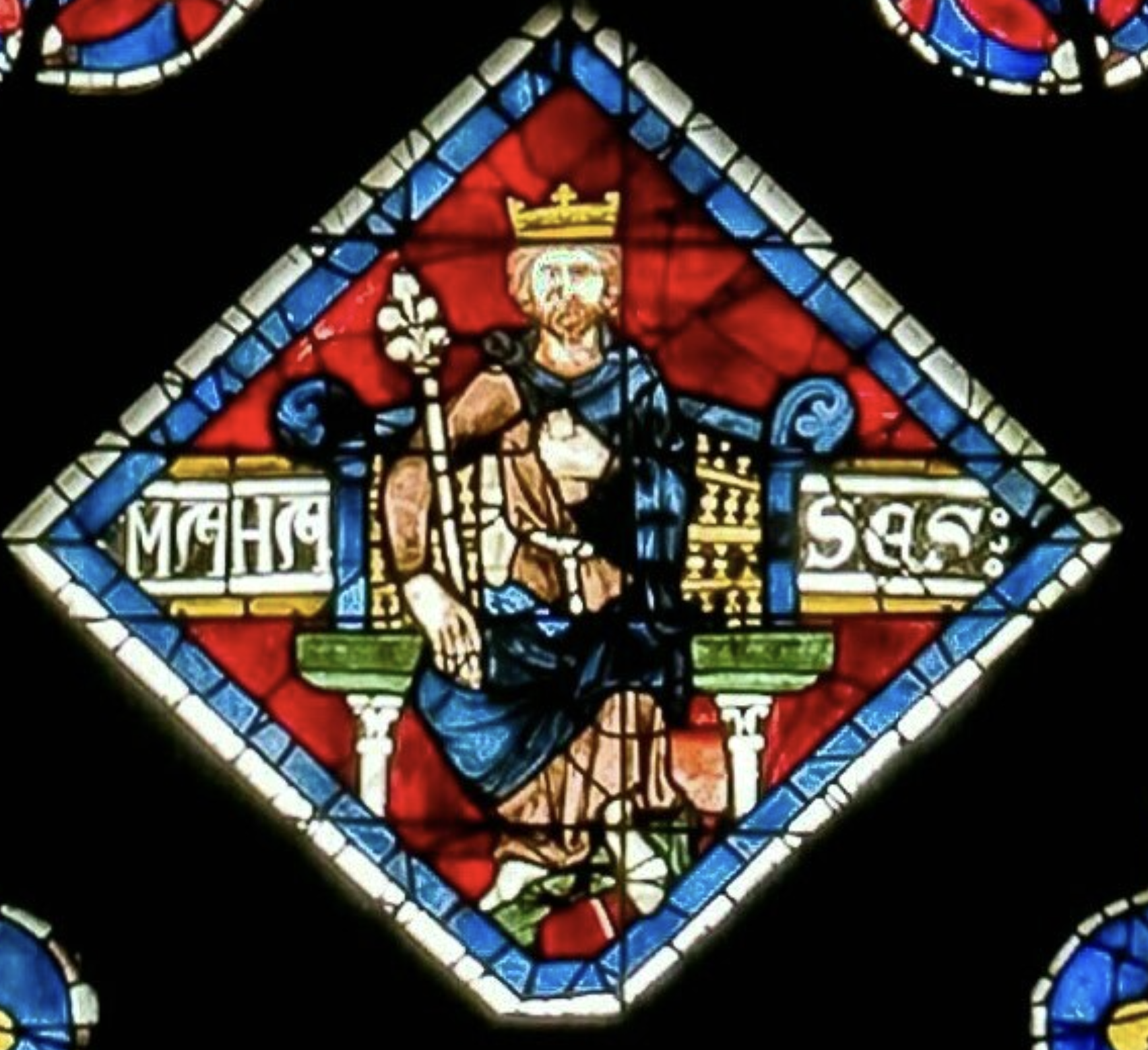
King Manasseh, from the north rose window of Chartres Cathedral

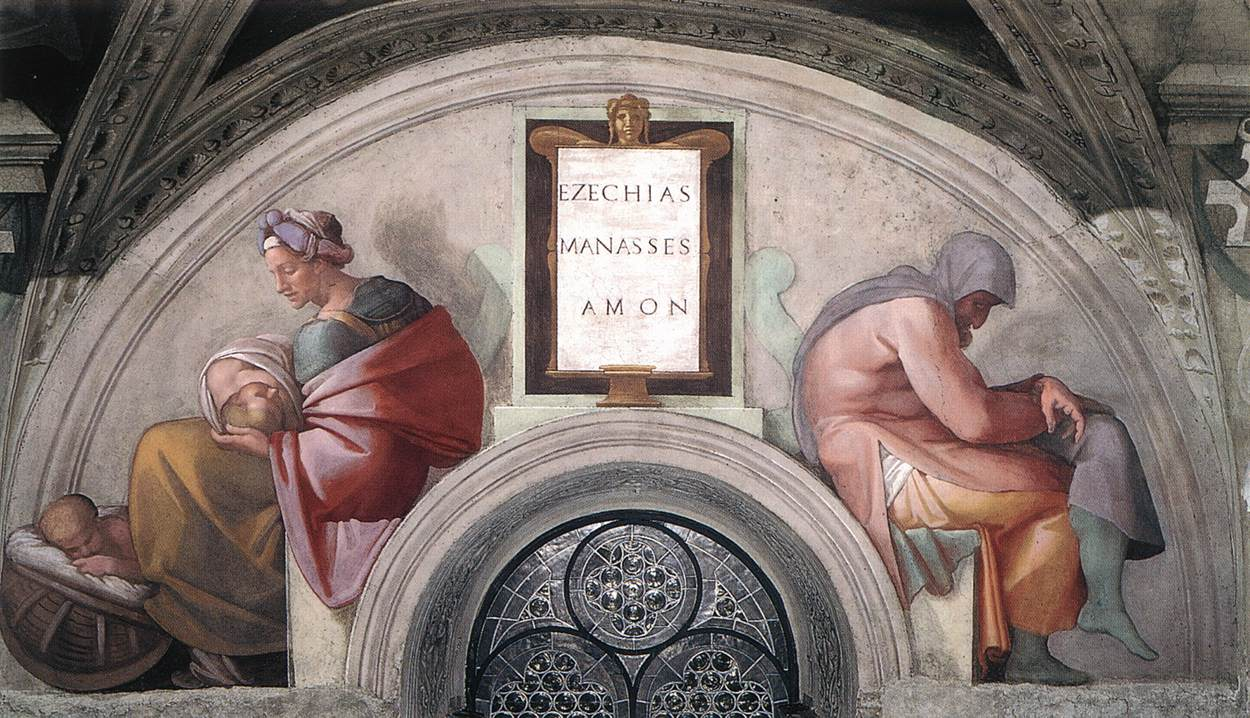
Hezekiah, Manasseh, and Amon, from the Sistine Chapel ceiling.

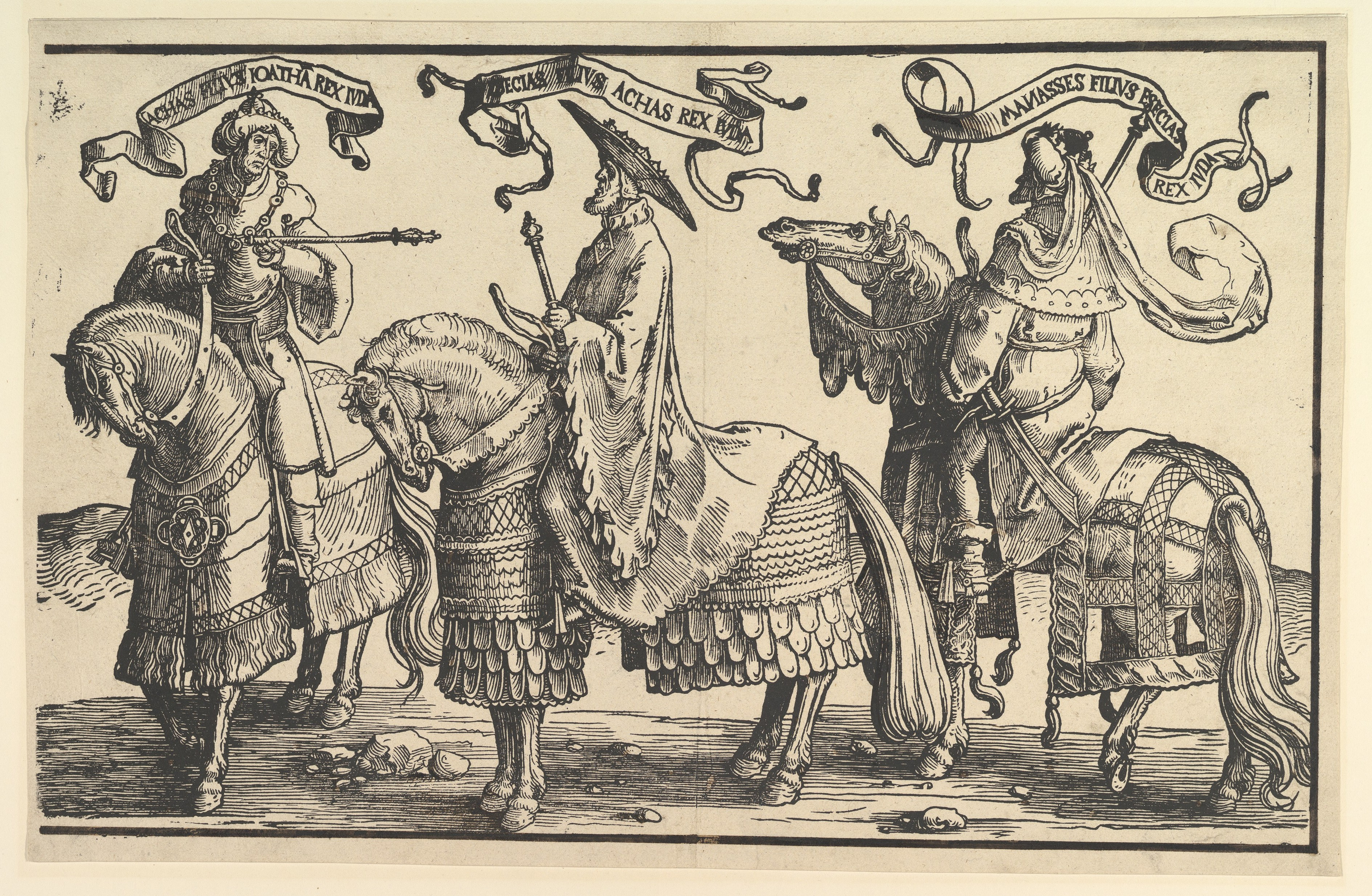
Ahaz, Hezekiah, and Manasseh, by Lucas van Leyden

Manasseh (/məˈnæsə/; Hebrew: מְנַשֶּׁה Mənaššé; Akkadian: 𒈨𒈾𒋛𒄿 Menasî [me-na-si-i]; Ancient Greek: Μανασσῆς Manasses; Latin: Manasses) was the fourteenth king of the Kingdom of Judah. He was the oldest of the sons of Hezekiah and Hephzibah (2 Kings 21:1). He became king at the age of 12 and reigned for 55 years (2 Kings 21:1; 2 Chronicles 33:1).

== Biblical account ==
The Hebrew Bible documents Manasseh in 2 Kings 21:1–18 and 2 Chronicles 32:33–33:20. He is also mentioned in Jeremiah 15:4, where the prophet Jeremiah predicts "four forms of destruction" for the people of Judah because of the evil done by Manasseh in Judah.

Manasseh was the first king of Judah who was not contemporary with the northern kingdom of Israel, which the Assyrians had destroyed c. 720 BC, deporting much of its population. He re-instituted polytheistic worship and reversed the religious changes made by his father Hezekiah – hence his condemnation in several biblical verses.

He married Meshullemeth, daughter of Haruz of Jotbah, and they had a son Amon, who succeeded him as king of Judah upon his death. Hezekiah, Manasseh and Amon appear in the genealogy of Jesus in Matthew's gospel.

After a reign of 55 years, the longest in the history of Judah, he died c. 643 BC and was buried in the garden of Uzza, the "garden of his own house" (2 Kings 21:17–18; 2 Chronicles 33:20), and not in the City of David, among his ancestors. The biblical narratives report Manasseh's accession to the throne at the time of his father's death. However, Edwin Thiele concludes that he had commenced his reign as co-regent with his father Hezekiah in 697/696 BC, with the co-regency lasting 12 years and his sole reign beginning in 687/686 BC and continuing until his death in 643/642 BC.

== Relations with Assyria ==
When Manasseh's reign began, Sennacherib was king of Assyria, who reigned until 681 BC. Manasseh is mentioned in Assyrian records as a contemporary and loyal vassal of Sennacherib's son and successor, Esarhaddon. Assyrian records list Manasseh among twenty-two kings required to provide materials for Esarhaddon's building projects. Esarhaddon died in 669 BC and was succeeded by his son, Ashurbanipal, who also names Manasseh as one of a number of vassals who assisted his campaign against Egypt.

The Assyrian records are consistent with archaeological evidence of demographic trends and settlement patterns suggesting a period of stability in Judah during Manasseh's reign. Despite the criticisms of his religious policies in the biblical texts, archaeologists such as Israel Finkelstein and Neil Asher Silberman credit Manasseh with reviving Judah's rural economy, arguing that a possible Assyrian grant of most favoured nation status stimulated the creation of an export market. They argue that changes to the economic structure of the countryside would have required the cooperation of the "countryside aristocracy", with restoration of worship at the high places a quid pro quo for this. Apparent devastation of the fertile Shephelah, coupled with growth of the population of the highlands and the southeast of the kingdom (especially in the Beersheba valley) during Manasseh's reign, point to this possibility. Finkelstein has also suggested that Manasseh's extensive trade activity as a vassal of Assyria may have provided the basis for some of the biblical stories about King Solomon's great acquisition of wealth through foreign trade relationships.

=== Olive oil trade ===
Olive oil production and export played a big role in the economy of the time. There is evidence in the Gaza area of entrepôt trade, and an apparently flourishing olive oil industry at Ekron. The construction or reconstruction of forts at sites such as Arad and Horvat Uza, explored by Nadav Na'aman and others, is also argued by Finkelstein and Silberman to be evidence in support of this thesis, as they would have been needed to protect the trade routes. However, Finkelstein and Silberman argue that the trade led to great disparities between rich and poor, which in turn gave rise to civil unrest. As a result, they speculate, the Deuteronomist author or editor of 2 Kings later reworked the traditions about Manasseh to portray his outward-looking involvement in trade as, effectively, apostasy.

== Religious policies ==
There are three aspects of Manasseh's religious policy which the writer of Kings considered deplorable: the religious reaction which followed hard upon his accession; its extension by the free adoption of foreign cults; and the bitter persecution of the prophetic party.

According to Kings, Manasseh reversed the centralizing reforms of his father Hezekiah, and re-established local shrines, possibly for economic reasons. He restored polytheistic worship of Baal and Asherah (2 Kings 21) in the Temple, and sponsored the Assyrian astral cult throughout Judah. So zealous was he in his worship of the foreign gods, he is said to have participated in the sacrificial cult of Moloch which consisted of sacrificing young children or passing them through fire, but reflected legitimate Israelite practices through the Monarchic period. (2 Kings 21:6) His reign may be described as reactionary in relation to his father's, and Kings suggests that he may have executed supporters of his father's reforms. During Manasseh's half-century the popular worship was a medley of native and foreign cults, the influence of which was slow to disappear.

2 Kings 21:10 suggests that several prophets combined their condemnation of Manasseh. The Pulpit Commentary identifies the prophets as probably Isaiah and Habakkuk and possibly Nahum and Zephaniah. Manasseh's response was to persecute those who had bitterly condemned the popular syncretism. The prophets were put to the sword (Jeremiah 2:30). Exegetical tradition relates that Isaiah, Manasseh's own grandfather, suffered a particularly painful execution, sawn in two under the king's orders. "Innocent blood" reddened the streets of Jerusalem. For many decades those who sympathized with prophetic ideas were in constant peril.

Conversely, rather than as lapses from a previous strict Mosaic monotheism, accounting for contemporary domestic and foreign counterparts, Arnold J. Toynbee thinks as nearer to historical truth of Manasseh as well as Amon as pious conservatives, defending the faith of their ancestors.

=== Assyrian detention and repentance ===
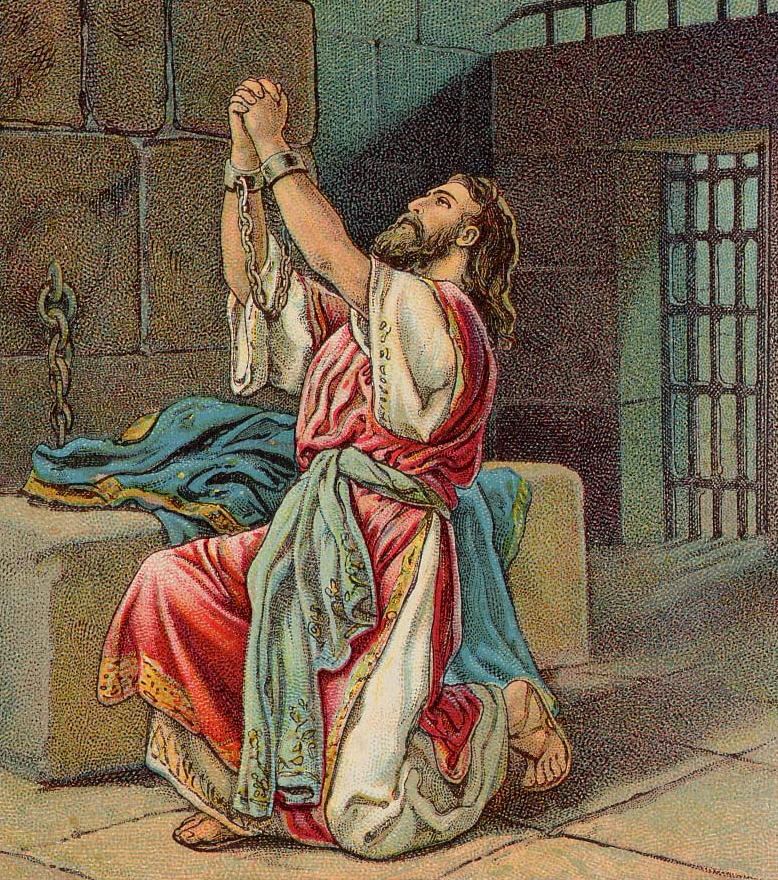
Manasseh's repentance; as in 2 Chronicles 33:1–13 (illustration from a Bible card published in 1904 by the Providence Lithograph Company)

According to 2 Chronicles 33:11–13 and Antiquities of the Jews, Manasseh was on one occasion brought in chains to the Assyrian king in Babylon, presumably for suspected disloyalty. The verse goes on to indicate that he was later treated well and restored to his throne. This event took place in 677 BC under the reign of Esarhaddon as it was only during the reign of Esarhaddon that Babylon was made a temporary capital. The next ruler (Esarhaddon’s son Ashurbanipal) reigned only from the Nineveh capital.

“This king was Esarhaddon, who…despatched his generals, the chief of whom was Tartan, with a portion of his army for the reduction of Judah also. In a successful attack upon Jerusalem, they…took Manasseh among the thorns…bound him with fetters, and carried him to Babylon.” "Esarhaddon became king of Babylon as well as of Nineveh, and appears to have held his court sometimes at the Assyrian and sometimes at the Babylonian capital. He left numerous splendid buildings, but is best known to the Biblical student as the king who carried away Manasseh, the son of Hezekiah, into temporary captivity.”

In the Chronicler's account, the severity of Manasseh's imprisonment brought him to repentance. Manasseh was restored to the throne, (2 Chronicles 33:11–13) and abandoned idolatry, removing the foreign idols (2 Chronicles 33:15) and enjoining the people to worship the Lord of Israel Jehovah.

== Chronological notes ==
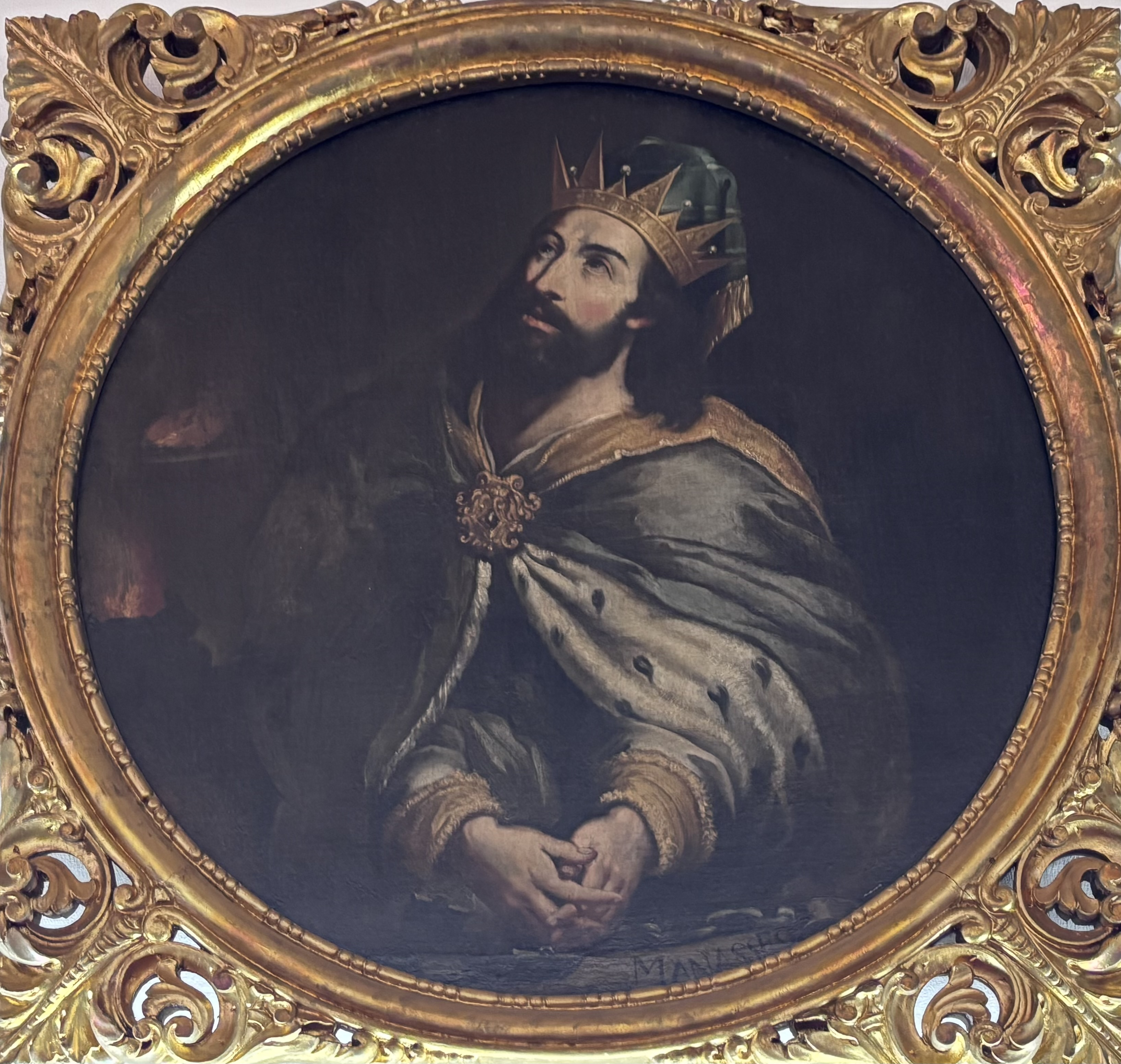
Manasseh by Goríbar. Convent of Santo Domingo in Quito.

Thiele dates Manasseh's reign back from the dates of the reign of his grandson, Josiah. Josiah died at the hands of Pharaoh Necho II in the summer of 609 BC. By Judean reckoning, which began regnal years in the fall month of Tishri, this would be in the year 610/609 BC. Josiah reigned for 31 years (2 Kings 21:19, 22:1) and began to reign after the short two-year reign of Amon. Manasseh's last year, 33 years earlier, would be 643/642 BC.

The length of Manasseh's reign is given as 55 years in 2 Kings 20:21. Assuming non-accession reckoning, as he usually did for coregencies, Thiele determined 54 "actual" years back to 697/696 BC, as the year when the Hezekiah/Manasseh coregency began. Non-accession reckoning means that the first partial year of a king in office was counted twice, once for him and once for his predecessor, so that one year must be subtracted when measuring spans of time. An analysis of the data for Jeroboam II of Israel and Jehoshaphat of Judah, both of whom had coregencies, shows that their years were measured in this way.

Regarding the Hezekiah/Manasseh coregency, Thiele observes Manasseh began his reign when he was 12 years old (2 Kings 21:1), and then comments, "A Hebrew lad when he reached the age of twelve was a 'son of the law' and had become gadol. He had then passed from the days of childhood to youth and was considered old enough to concern himself with the serious work of life ... it is only to be expected that the king, facing the prospect of the termination of his reign within fifteen years [2 Kings 20:6], would at the earliest moment give the heir-presumptive every advantage of training in leadership."

== In other literature ==
In rabbinic literature and Christian pseudepigrapha, Manasseh is accused of executing the prophet Isaiah, who was identified as the maternal grandfather of Manasseh.

The Prayer of Manasseh, a penitential prayer attributed to Manasseh, appears in some Christian Bibles, but is considered apocryphal by Jews, Catholics and Protestants.

Manasseh is also made reference to in chapter 21 of 1 Meqabyan, a book considered canonical in the Ethiopian Orthodox Tewahedo Church, where he is used as an example of ungodly king.

== See also ==
- List of biblical figures identified in extra-biblical sources
- Tel Be'er Sheva, site of ancient Beersheba

== Sources ==
- Finkelstein, Israel; Silberman, Neil Asher (2001). The Bible Unearthed. New York: Free Press.
- Finkelstein, Israel; Silberman, Neil Asher (2006). David and Solomon: In Search of the Bible's Sacred Kings and the Roots of Western Tradition. New York: Free Press.

Manasseh of Judah House of David
Preceded by Hezekiah	King of Judah; Coregency: 697–687 BC; Sole reign: 687–643 BC	Succeeded by Amon
