= Nativity of Jesus =

Birth of Jesus

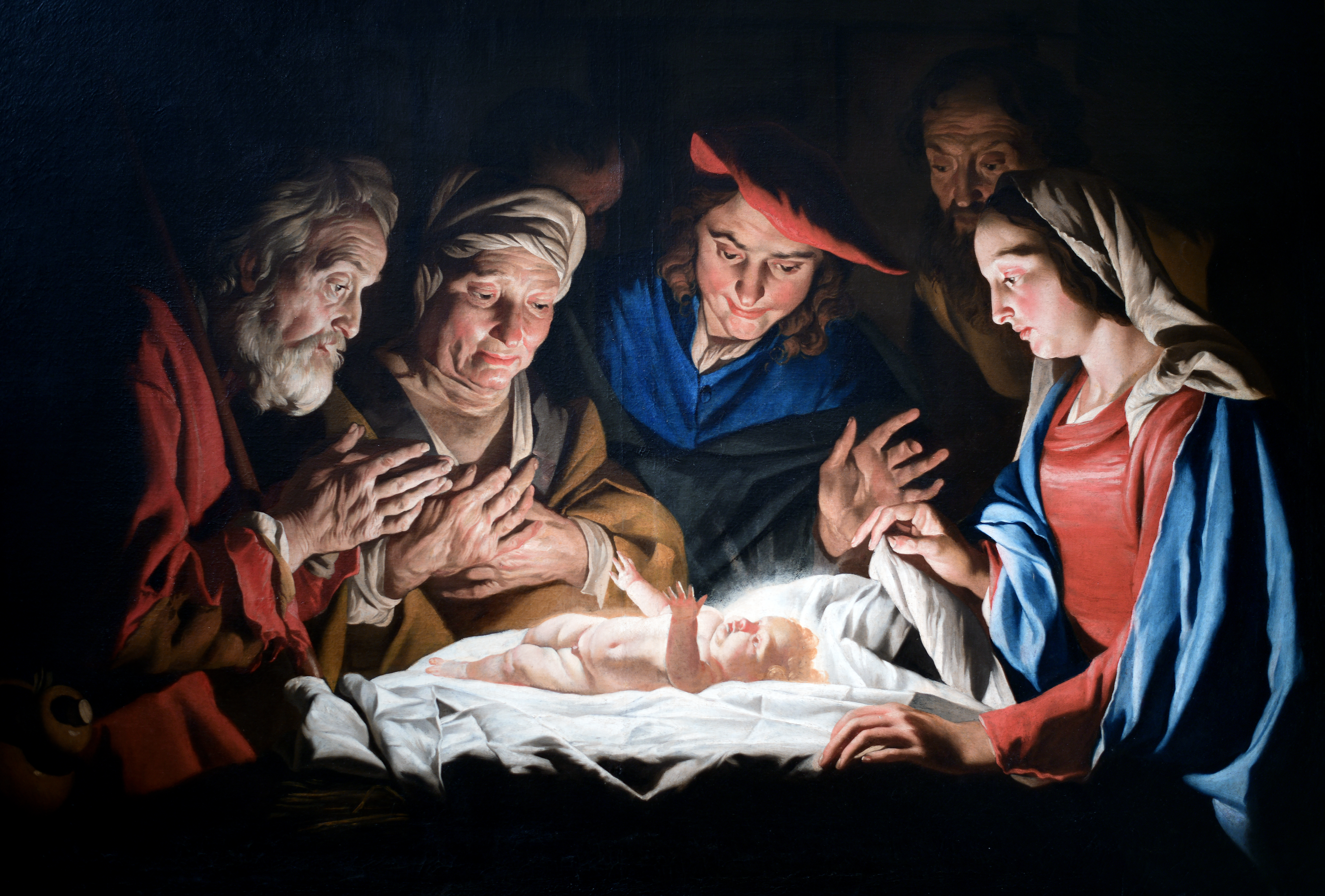
Adoration of the Shepherds by Dutch painter Matthias Stom, c. 1650

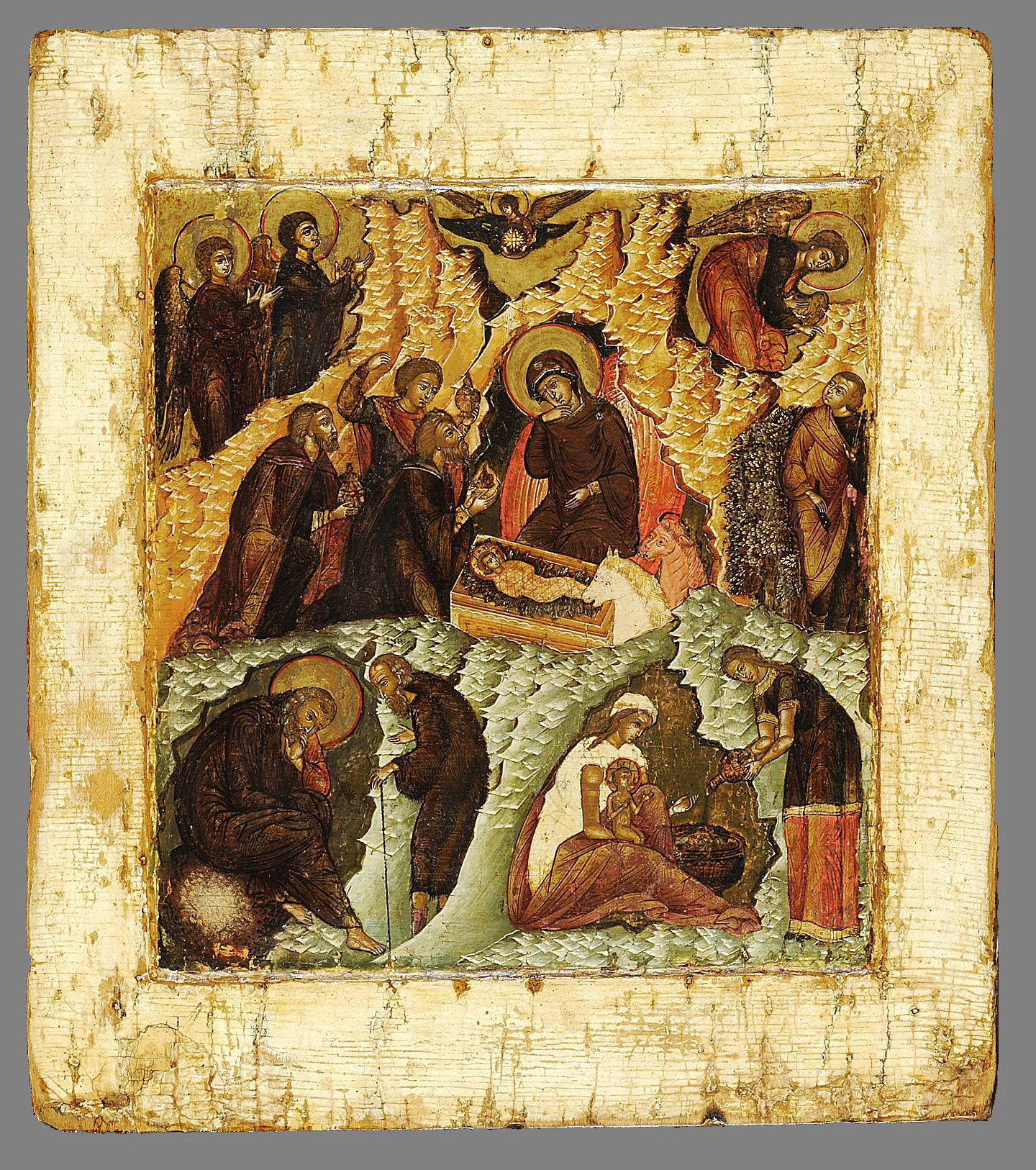
The Nativity, an early 18th-century Russian Orthodox icon featuring common Orthodox iconographic elements of the Nativity by an anonymous Russian iconographer

The Nativity or birth of Jesus is found in the biblical gospels of Matthew and Luke. The two accounts agree that Jesus was born in Bethlehem in Judea, that his mother, Mary, was engaged to a man named Joseph, who was descended from King David and was not his biological father, and that his birth was caused by divine intervention.

Many contemporary scholars do not see the Nativity stories as historically factual, regarding them as laced with theology and presenting two different accounts and genealogies, though they are considered to contain some useful biographical information concerning Jesus's birth during the reign of Augustus and his father's name. Some traditional scholars have maintained the historicity of the narratives. Matthew's account of the appearance of an angel to Joseph, the wise men from the East, the massacre of the innocents, and the flight to Egypt, do not appear in Luke, which instead describes the appearance of an angel to Mary, the census; the birth in a manger, and the choir of angels appearing to the shepherds.

The Nativity is the basis for the Christian holiday of Christmas and plays a major role in the Christian liturgical year. Many Christians traditionally display small manger scenes depicting the Nativity within or outside of their homes, or attend Nativity plays or Christmas pageants focusing on the Nativity cycle in the Bible. Elaborate Nativity displays featuring life-sized statues are a tradition in many continental European countries during the Christmas season.

The artistic depiction of the Nativity has been an important subject for Christian artists since the 4th century. Artistic depictions of the Nativity scene since the 13th century have emphasized the humility of Jesus and promoted a more tender image of him, a major change from the early "Lord and Master" image, mirroring changes in the common approaches taken by Christian pastoral ministry during the same era.

== Gospel accounts ==
Only the Gospels of Matthew and Luke offer narratives regarding the birth of Jesus. Both agree that Jesus was born in Bethlehem in the reign of King Herod, that his mother was named Mary and that her husband Joseph was descended from King David (although they disagree on details of the line of descent), and both deny Joseph's biological parenthood while treating the birth, or rather the conception, as divinely effected. Beyond this, they agree on very little. Joseph dominates Matthew's and Mary dominates Luke's, and James Barker suggests that Luke intended to supplement Matthew’s nativity by adding Mary’s perspective to Matthew’s Joseph, while Brown questions the idea. Matthew implies that Joseph already has his home in Bethlehem, while Luke states that he lived in Nazareth. In Matthew the angel speaks to Joseph, while Luke has one speaking to Mary. Only Luke has the stories surrounding the birth of John the Baptist, the census of Quirinius, the adoration of the shepherds and the presentation in the Temple on the fortieth day; only Matthew has the wise men, the star of Bethlehem, Herod's plot, the Massacre of the Innocents, and the flight into Egypt. The two itineraries are quite different. According to Matthew, the Holy Family begins in Bethlehem, moves to Egypt following the birth, and settles in Nazareth, while according to Luke they begin in Nazareth, journey to Bethlehem for the birth, and immediately return to Nazareth. (Note: A more complete account of the similarities and differences between the two can be found in Raymond E. Brown, "Birth of the Messiah", pp.34-35, and in Barbara Shellard, "New Light on Luke: Its Purpose, Sources and Literary Context", pp.79-81.)

Comparison between the Nativity narratives in the Gospels of Luke and Matthew
Luke	Matthew
Map of the Nativity narrative according to Luke	Map of the Nativity narrative according to Matthew
1. Annunciation to Mary in Nazareth	1. Annunciation to Joseph
2. Census of Quirinius (6–7 CE)	–
3. Joseph and Mary travel from Nazareth to Bethlehem	–
4. Birth of Jesus in Bethlehem	2. Birth of Jesus in Bethlehem
5. Annunciation to the shepherds in the fields	–
6. Adoration of the shepherds in Bethlehem	–
–	3. Magi "follow the star" and visit Herod in Jerusalem
–	4. Adoration of the Magi in Bethlehem
7. Jesus is presented at the temple in Jerusalem	5. Joseph, Mary and Jesus flee to Egypt to escape Herod
–	6. Massacre of the Innocents in Bethlehem
–	7. Death of Herod (4 BC)
8. Joseph, Mary and Jesus return home to Nazareth	8. Joseph, Mary and Jesus return from Egypt
–	9. Joseph, Mary and Jesus settle in Nazareth

== Gospel of Matthew ==
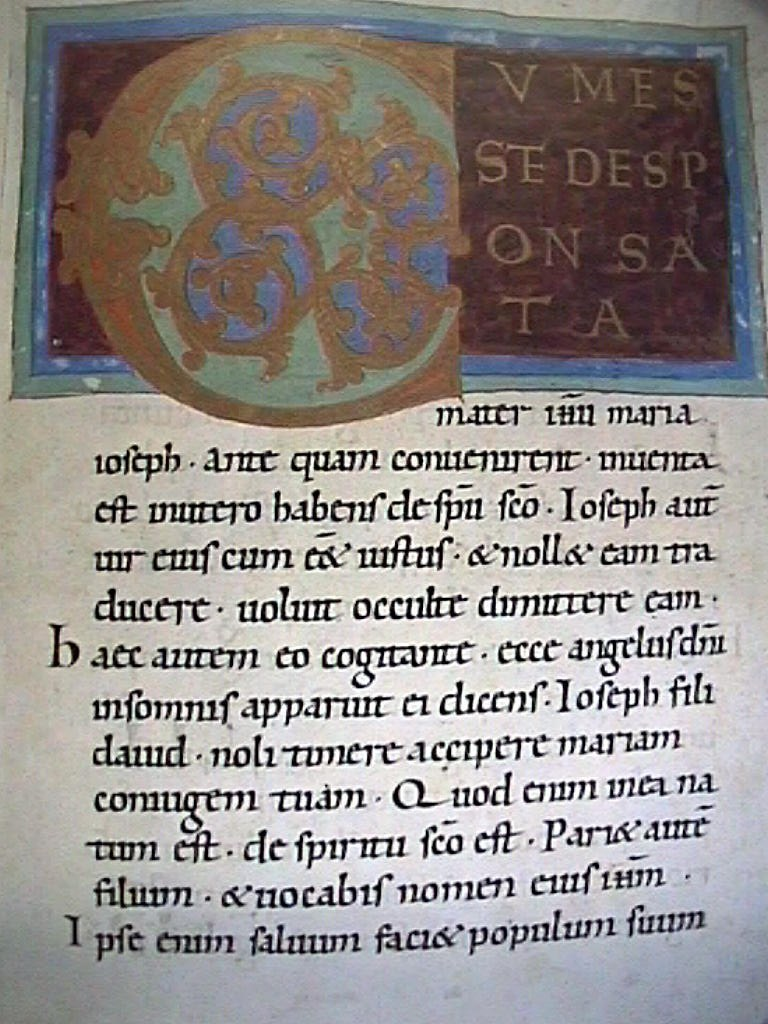
A page from the 11th-century Bamberg Apocalypse showing Matthew 1:21

=== Annunciation to Joseph ===
Mary, the mother of Jesus, was betrothed to Joseph, but was found to be pregnant through the Holy Spirit. Joseph intended to divorce her quietly, but an angel told him in a dream that he should take her as his wife and name the child Jesus, "because it is he who will save his people from their sins". This would fulfil the prophecy that a virgin would give birth to a son, who would be known as Emmanuel, meaning "God is with us". Joseph awoke, took Mary for his wife, did not have intercourse with her, and she gave birth to a boy, and gave him the name Jesus (Matthew 1:18–25).

Joseph has been shown to be the descendant of David (the angel addresses him as "son of David") and heir to the kingdom of Judah, but Matthew 1:16 reveals that Jesus is not Joseph's son, and Matthew is careful never to refer to him in this way. The role of Joseph in naming the child indicates that he is being legally adopted, and thus becoming, like his now-legal father, "son of David."

=== Adoration of the magi ===
The birth took place in the town of Bethlehem in the region known as Judea to the Romans and Judah to the Assyrians, in the time of King Herod (Herod the Great). Wise men from the East (the Magi) came to Jerusalem, asking where they could find the child born king of the Jews, for they had seen his star at its rising, and wished to pay him homage. Herod and all Jerusalem were afraid when they heard this, but Herod, learning from the chief priests and scribes that the messiah would be born in Bethlehem according to prophecy, sent the Magi there with instructions to return and tell him when they had found him. The Magi worshipped the child in Bethlehem and gave him gifts of gold, frankincense, and myrrh, but an angel warned them in a dream not to return to Herod, and they returned home by another way.

=== Massacre of the Innocents, flight into Egypt, and return to Israel ===
When Herod learned that the Magi had tricked him, he was infuriated and killed all the children in and around Bethlehem under the age of two (the Massacre of the Innocents). This was in fulfilment of the prophet Jeremiah: "A voice was heard in Ramah, wailing and loud lamentation, Rachel weeping for her children; she refused to be consoled, because they are no more." But an angel had appeared to Joseph in a dream and warned him to take the child and his mother and flee to Egypt, and the Holy Family remained there until Herod died to fulfil the words of the prophet, "Out of Egypt I have called my son." On the death of Herod an angel appeared to Joseph in a dream and told him to return with the child and its mother to Israel, but Herod's son was now ruler of Judea, and after being warned in a dream Joseph went instead to Galilee, where he made his home in Nazareth "so that what had been spoken through the prophets might be fulfilled, "He will be called a Nazorean.""

In this chapter, the author of Matthew needs to establish that "Jesus of Nazareth" was in fact born in Bethlehem, the town where David was born, for the "son of David" born there will be "King of the Jews" (a designation that does not reappear in Matthew until the crucifixion). Herod's fear and the visit of the Magi underline the royal birth, as do the various prophetic texts quoted or referenced in this chapter.

== Gospel of Luke ==
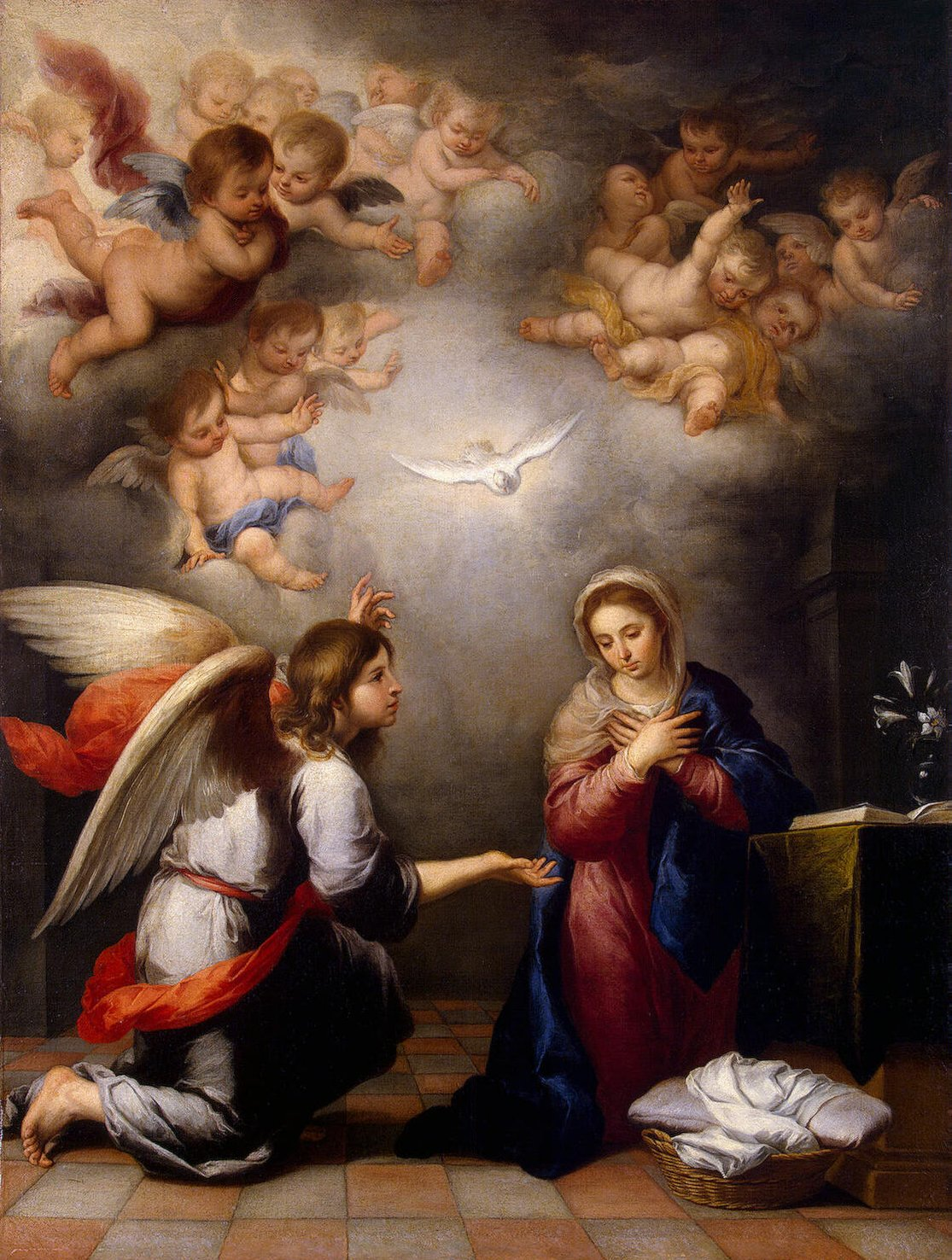
Angel Gabriel's Annunciation to Mary, by Murillo, c. 1660

In the Gospel of Luke, when Herod was king of Judea, God sent the angel Gabriel to Nazareth in Galilee to announce to a virgin named Mary, who was betrothed to a man named Joseph, that a child would be born to her. The angel Gabriel announced that she was to name him Jesus, for he would be the son of God and rule over Israel forever. When the time of the birth drew near, Caesar Augustus commanded a census of Roman domains, and Joseph took Mary to Bethlehem, the ancient city of David, as he was of the House of David. Jesus was born in Bethlehem; since there was nowhere for them to stay in the town, the infant was laid in a manger while angels announced his birth to a group of shepherds who worshipped him as Messiah and Lord.

In accordance with the Jewish law, his parents presented the infant Jesus at the Temple in Jerusalem, where two people in the temple, Simeon and Anna the Prophetess, gave thanks to God who had sent his salvation. Joseph and Mary then returned to Nazareth.

== Date and place of birth ==
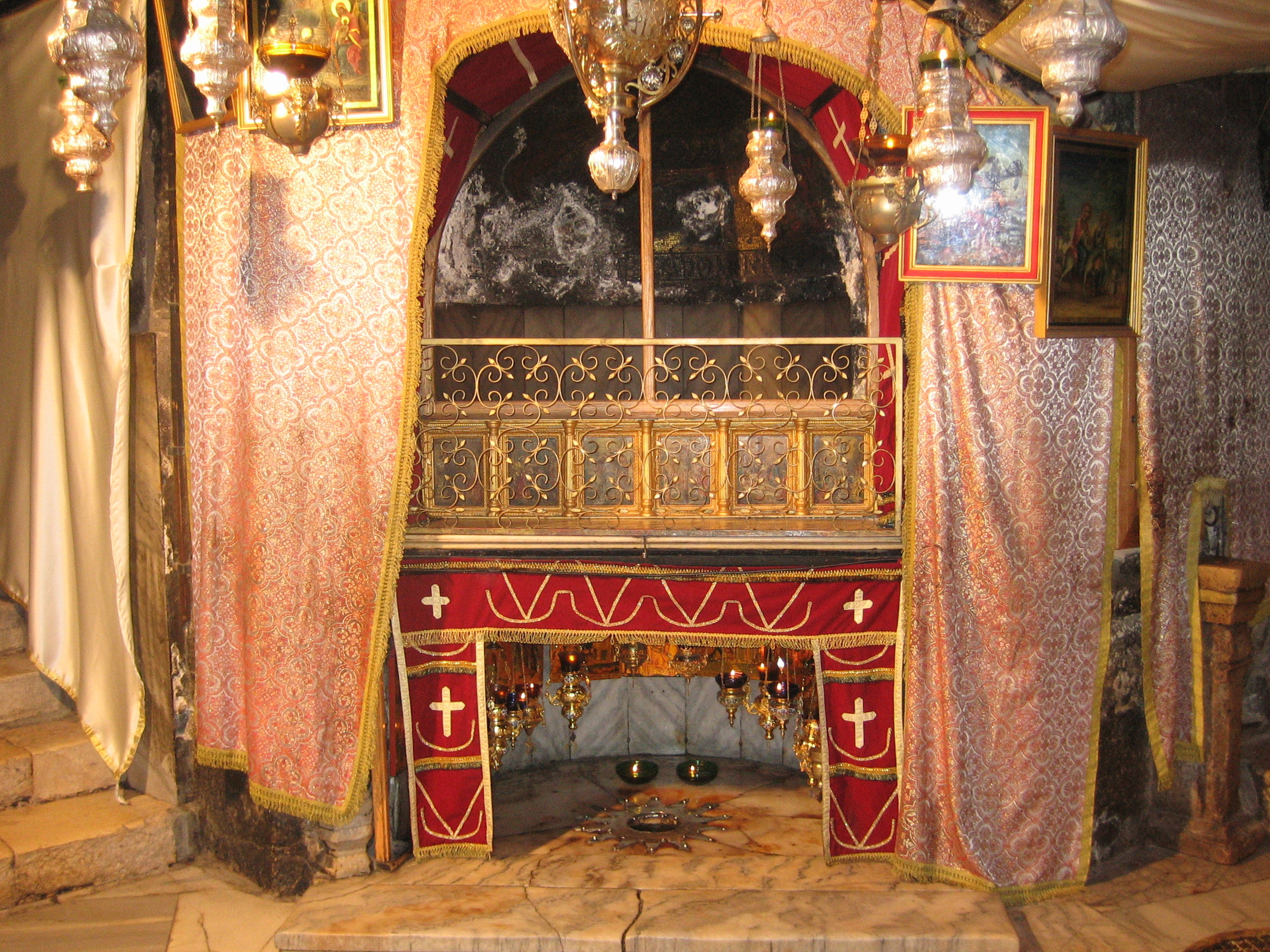
Altar in the Church of the Nativity, Bethlehem

Matthew and Luke agree that Jesus was born in Bethlehem in Judea during the reign of Herod the Great. In Luke the newborn baby is placed in a manger "because there was no place in the katalyma". Katalyma might mean a private home (this has little support among scholars), or a room in a private home, or an inn, but it is impossible to be certain which is meant.

In the 2nd century, Justin Martyr stated that Jesus had been born in a cave outside the town, while the Protoevangelium of James described a legendary birth in a cave nearby. The Church of the Nativity inside the town, built by St. Helena, contains the cave-manger site traditionally venerated as the birthplace of Jesus, which may have originally been a site of the cult of the god Tammuz. In his Contra Celsum (1.51), Origen, who travelled throughout Palestine beginning in around 215, wrote of the "manger of Jesus".

The date of birth for Jesus of Nazareth is not stated in the gospels or in any secular text, but basing it on the death of Herod would place the date between 6 BC and 4 BC. The historical evidence is too ambiguous to allow a definitive date to be determined, but dates have been estimated through known historical events mentioned in the Nativity accounts, by working backwards from the estimated start of the ministry of Jesus, or by associating the claimed astrological portents mentioned with actual historical astronomical alignments and phenomena.

Most critical historians do not think that Jesus was born in Bethlehem. According to Helen K. Bond, "the reference to Bethlehem is once again symbolic." She states that Jesus was probably born in Nazareth. The Historical Jesus for Dummies agrees.

== Themes and analogies ==
=== Thematic analysis ===
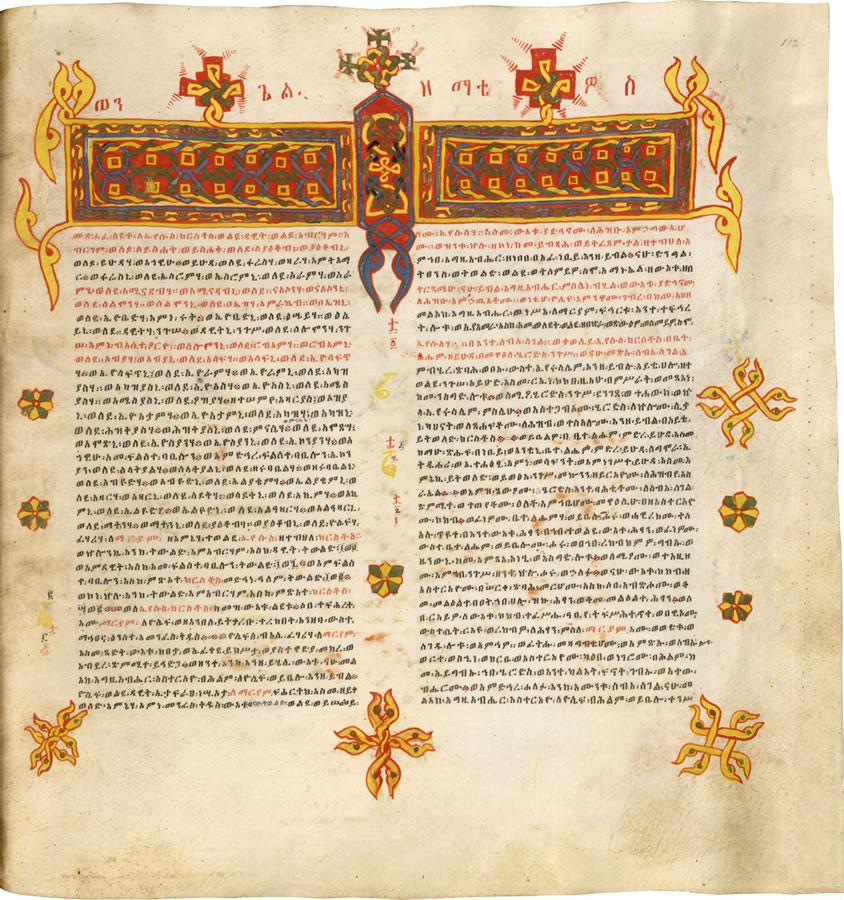
Gospel of Matthew from an Ethiopian Bible, 1700

Helmut Koester writes that while Matthew's narrative was formed in a Jewish environment, Luke's was modeled to appeal to the Greco-Roman world. In particular, while shepherds were regarded negatively by Jews in Jesus's time, they were seen in Greco-Roman culture as "symbols of a golden age when gods and humans lived in peace and nature was at harmony". C. T. Ruddick Jr. writes that Luke's birth narratives of Jesus and John were modeled on passages from Genesis, chapters 27–43. Regardless, Luke's Nativity depicts Jesus as a savior for all people, tracing a genealogy all the way back to Adam, demonstrating his common humanity, and likewise for the lowly circumstances of his birth. Luke, writing for a gentile audience, portrays the infant Jesus as a savior for gentiles as well as Jews. Matthew uses quotations from Jewish scripture, scenes reminiscent of Moses' life, and a numerical pattern in his genealogy to identify Jesus as a son of David, of Abraham, and of God. Luke's prelude is much longer, emphasizing the age of the Holy Spirit and the arrival of a savior for all people, both Jew and gentile.

Mainstream scholars interpret Matthew's Nativity as depicting Jesus as a new Moses with a genealogy going back to Abraham, while Ulrich Luz views Matthew's depiction of Jesus at once as the new Moses and the inverse of Moses, and not simply a retelling of the Moses story. Luz also points out that in the massacre narrative, once again, a fulfilment quotation is given: Rachel, the ancestral mother of Israel, weeping for her dead children (Matthew 2:18).

Scholars who interpret Matthew as casting Jesus in the role of being a second Moses argue that, like Moses, the infant Jesus is saved from a murderous tyrant; and he flees the country of his birth until his persecutor is dead and it is safe to return as the savior of his people. In this view, the account in Matthew is based on an earlier narrative patterned on traditions about the birth of Moses. Moses's birth is announced to Pharaoh by Magi; the child is threatened and rescued; the male Israelite children are similarly put to death by an evil king.

According to Ulrich Luz, the beginning of the narrative of Matthew is similar to earlier biblical stories, e.g., the Annunciation of Jesus's birth (Matthew 1:18–25) is reminiscent of the biblical accounts of the births of Ishmael (Genesis 16:11, Genesis 17), Isaac (Genesis 21:1), Samson (Judges 13:3, 13:5), and recalls the Haggadic traditions of the birth of Moses. Yet in Luz's view, the contours appear, in part, strangely overlapped and inverted: "Egypt, formerly the land of suppression becomes a place of refuge and it is the King of Israel who now takes on the role of Pharaoh. Yet Matthew is not simply retelling the Moses story. Instead, the story of Jesus really is a new story: Jesus is at once the new Moses and the inverse of Moses."

=== Old Testament parallels ===
Scholars have debated whether Matthew 1:22 and Matthew 2:23 refer to specific Old Testament passages. Fourth century documents such as the Codex Sinaiticus do not mention the prophet Isaiah in the statement in Matthew 1:22: "All this happened to fulfill what the Lord had spoken by the prophet", but some copies of Matthew from the 5th–6th centuries, such as the Codex Bezae, read "Isaiah the prophet". The statement in Matthew 1:23, "Behold the virgin shall be with child", uses the Greek term parthenos ("virgin") as in the Septuagint Isaiah, while the Book of Isaiah 7:14 uses the Hebrew almah, which may mean "maiden", "young woman", or "virgin". Raymond E. Brown states that the 3rd century BC translators of the Septuagint may have understood the Hebrew word almah to mean "virgin" in this context.

The statement in Matthew 2:23 that "he will be called a Nazarene" does not mention a specific passage in the Old Testament, and there are multiple scholarly interpretations as to what it may refer to. Barbara Aland and other scholars consider the Greek Ναζωραίος, Nazoréos used for 'Nazarene' of uncertain etymology and meaning, but M. J. J. Menken states that it is a demonym that refers to an "inhabitant of Nazareth". Menken also states that it may be referring to Judges 13:5 and 13:7. Gary Smith states that Nazirite may mean one consecrated to God, i.e. an ascetic; or may refer to Isaiah 11:1. The Oxford Bible Commentary states that it may be word-play on the use of nazirite, "Holy One of God," in Isaiah 4:3, meant to identify Jesus with the Nazarenes, a Jewish sect who differed from the Pharisees only in that they regarded Jesus as the Messiah. The Swiss theologian Ulrich Luz, who locates the Matthean community in Syria, has noted that Syrian Christians also called themselves Nazarenes.

== Christian theology ==
The theological significance of the Nativity of Jesus has been a key element in Christian teachings, from the early Church Fathers to 20th century theologians. The theological issues were addressed as early as Apostle Paul, but continued to be debated and eventually led to both Christological and Mariological differences among Christians that resulted in early schisms within the Church by the 5th century.

=== Birth of the new man ===
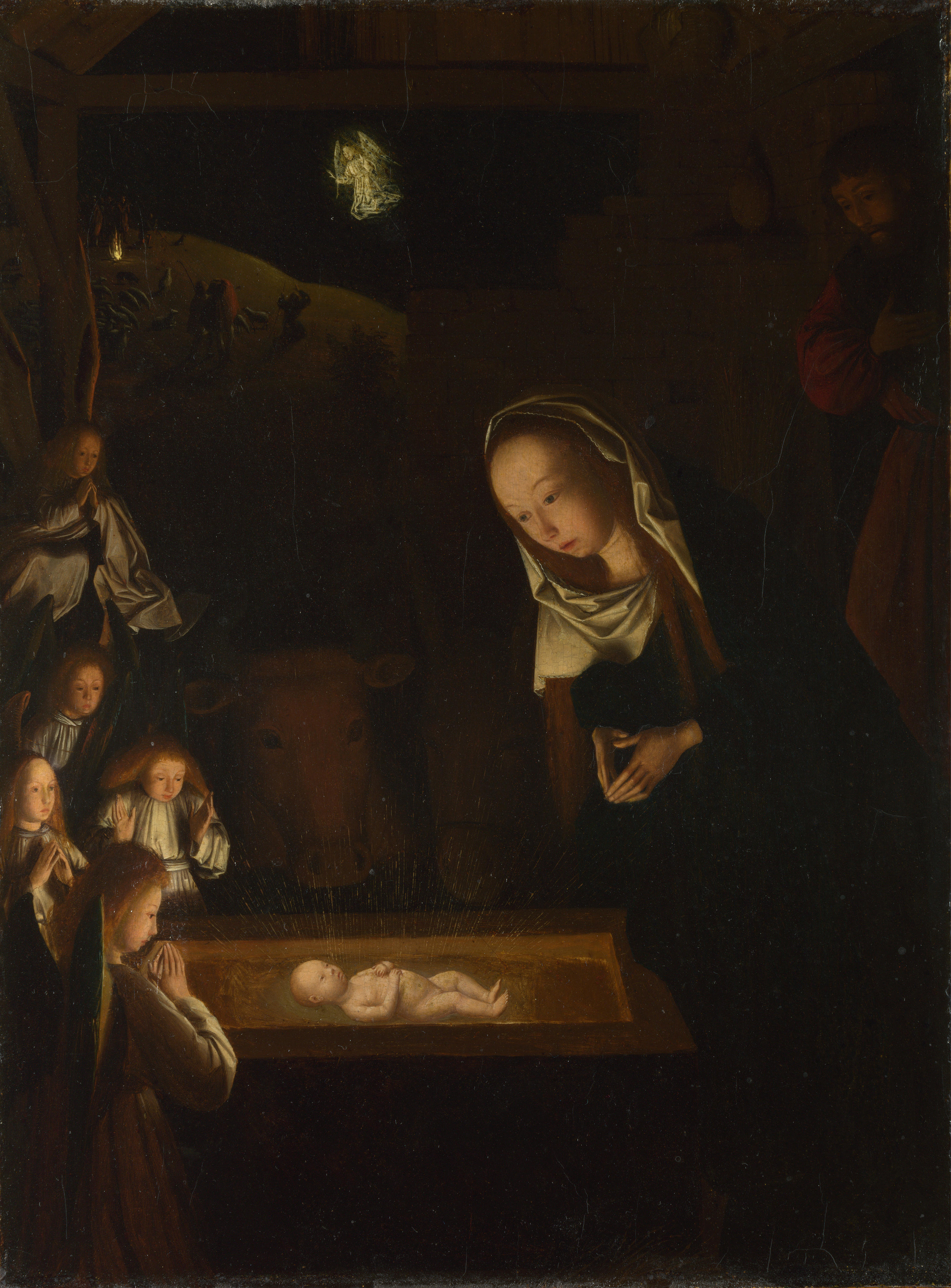
Nativity at Night, by Geertgen tot Sint Jans, c. 1490

He is the image of the invisible God, the firstborn of all creation. For by him all things were created, in heaven and on earth, visible and invisible.

— Colossians 1:15–16 regards the birth of Jesus as the model for all creation.

Paul the Apostle viewed the birth of Jesus as an event of cosmic significance which brought forth a "new man" who undid the damage caused by the fall of the first man, Adam. Just as the Johannine view of Jesus as the incarnate Logos proclaims the universal relevance of his birth, the Pauline perspective emphasizes the birth of a new man and a new world in the birth of Jesus. Paul's eschatological view of Jesus counter-positions him as a new man of morality and obedience, in contrast to Adam. Unlike Adam, the new man born in Jesus obeys God and ushers in a world of morality and salvation.

In the Pauline view, Adam is positioned as the first man and Jesus as the second: Adam, having corrupted himself by his disobedience, also infected humanity and left it with a curse as inheritance. The birth of Jesus, on the other hand, counterbalanced the fall of Adam, bringing forth redemption and repairing the damage done by Adam.

In patristic theology, Paul's contrasting of Jesus as the new man versus Adam provided a framework for discussing the uniqueness of the birth of Jesus and the ensuing events of his life. The Nativity of Jesus thus began to serve as the starting point for "cosmic Christology" in which the birth, life and Resurrection of Jesus have universal implications. The concept of Jesus as the "new man" repeats in the cycle of birth and rebirth of Jesus from his Nativity to his resurrection: following his birth, through his morality and obedience to the Father, Jesus began a new harmony in the relationship between God the Father and man. The Nativity and resurrection of Jesus thus created the author and exemplar of a new humanity.

In the 2nd century Church Father Irenaeus writes:

When He became incarnate and was made man, He commenced afresh the long line of human beings, and furnished us, in a brief, comprehensive manner, with salvation; so that what we had lost in Adam – namely to be according to the image and likeness of God – that we might recover in Christ Jesus.

Irenaeus was also one of the early theologians to use the analogy of "second Adam and second Eve". He suggested the Virgin Mary as the "second Eve" and wrote that the Mary had "untied the knot of sin bound up by the virgin Eve" and that just as Eve had tempted Adam to disobey God, Mary had set a path of obedience for the second Adam (i.e. Jesus) from the Annunciation to Calvary so that Jesus could bring about salvation, undoing the damage of Adam.

In the 4th century, this uniqueness of the circumstances related to the Nativity of Jesus, and their interplay with the mystery of the incarnation, became a central element in both the theology and hymnody of Ephrem the Syrian. For him, the uniqueness of the Nativity of Jesus was supplemented with the sign of the majesty of the Creator through the ability of a powerful God to enter the world as a small newborn.

In the Middle Ages the birth of Jesus as the second Adam came to be seen in the context of Saint Augustine's Felix culpa ("happy fall") and was intertwined with the popular teachings on the fall from grace of Adam and Eve. Augustine was fond of a statement on the Nativity by Gregory of Nyssa and he quoted it five times: "Venerate the Nativity, through which you are freed from the bonds of an earthly nativity". He also liked to quote: "Just as in Adam all of us died, so too in Christ all of us will be brought to life".

The theology persisted into the Protestant Reformation, and second Adam was one of the six modes of atonement discussed by John Calvin. In the 20th century, leading theologian Karl Barth continued the same line of reasoning and viewed the Nativity of Jesus as the birth of a new man who succeeded Adam. In Barth's theology, in contrast to Adam, Jesus acted as an obedient Son in the fulfilment of the divine will and was therefore free from sin and could hence reveal the righteousness of God the Father and bring about salvation.

=== Christology ===
The Nativity of Jesus impacted the Christological issues about the Person of Christ from the earliest days of Christianity. Luke's Christology centers on the dialectics of the dual natures of the earthly and heavenly manifestations of existence of the Christ, while Matthew's Christology focuses on the mission of Jesus and his role as the savior.

The belief in the divinity of Jesus leads to the question: "was Jesus a man to be born of a woman or was he God born of a woman?" A wide range of hypotheses and beliefs regarding the nature of the Nativity of Jesus were presented in the first four centuries of Christianity. Some of the debates involved the title Theotokos (God bearer) for the Virgin Mary and began to illustrate the impact of Mariology on Christology. Some of these viewpoints were eventually declared as heresies, others led to schisms and the formation of new branches of the Church.

The salvific emphasis of Matthew 1:21 later impacted the theological issues and the devotions to the Holy Name of Jesus. Matthew 1:23 provides the only key to the Emmanuel Christology in the New Testament. Beginning with 1:23, Matthew shows a clear interest in identifying Jesus as "God with us" and in later developing the Emmanuel characterization of Jesus at key points throughout the rest of his Gospel. The name 'Emmanuel' does not appear elsewhere in the New Testament, but Matthew builds on it in Matthew 28:20 ("I am with you always, even unto the end of the world") to indicate that Jesus will be with the faithful to the end of the age. According to Ulrich Luz, the Emmanuel motif brackets the entire Gospel of Matthew between 1:23 and 28:20, appearing explicitly and implicitly in several other passages.

A number of ecumenical councils were convened in the 4th and 5th centuries to deal with these issues. The Council of Ephesus debated hypostasis (co-existing natures) versus Monophysitism (only one nature) versus Miaphysitism (two natures united as one) versus Nestorianism (disunion of two natures). The 451 Council of Chalcedon was highly influential and marked a key turning point in the Christological debates that divided the church of the Eastern Roman Empire in the 5th century. In Chalcedon the hypostatic union was decreed, namely that Jesus is both fully divine and fully human, making this part of the creed of orthodox Christianity.

In the 5th century, leading Church Father Pope Leo I used the Nativity as a key element of his theology. Leo gave 10 sermons on the Nativity and 7 have survived. The one on December 25, 451, demonstrates his concern to increase the importance of the feast of Nativity and along with it emphasize the two natures of Christ in defense of the Christological doctrine of hypostatic union. Leo often used his Nativity sermons as an occasion to attack opposing viewpoints, without naming the opposition. Thus Leo used the occasion of the Nativity feast to establish boundaries for what could be considered a heresy regarding the birth and nature of Christ.

In the 13th century, Thomas Aquinas addressed the Christological attribution of the Nativity: if it should be attributed to the person (the Word) or only to the assumed human nature of that person. Aquinas treated Nativity in 8 separate articles in Summa Theologica, each posing a separate question:

- "Does Nativity regard the nature rather than the Person?"
- "Should a temporal Nativity be attributed to Christ?"
- "Should the Blessed Virgin be called Christ's Mother?"
- "Should the Blessed Virgin be called the Mother of God?"
- "Are there two filiations in Christ?", etc.

To deal with this issue, Aquinas distinguishes between the person born and the nature in which the birth takes place. Aquinas thus resolved the question by arguing that in the hypostatic union Christ has two natures, one received from the Father from eternity, the other from his mother in time. This approach also resolved the Mariological problem of Mary receiving the title of Theotokos for under this scenario she is the "Mother of God".

During the Reformation, John Calvin argued that Jesus was not sanctified to be "God manifested as Incarnate" (Deus manifestatus in carne) only due to his virgin birth, but through the action of the Holy Spirit at the instant of his birth. Thus Calvin argued that Jesus was exempt from original sin because he was sanctified at the moment of birth so that his generation was without blemish; as generation was blemishless before the fall of Adam.

== Impact on Christianity ==
=== Christmas, the Feast of the Nativity of Our Lord ===
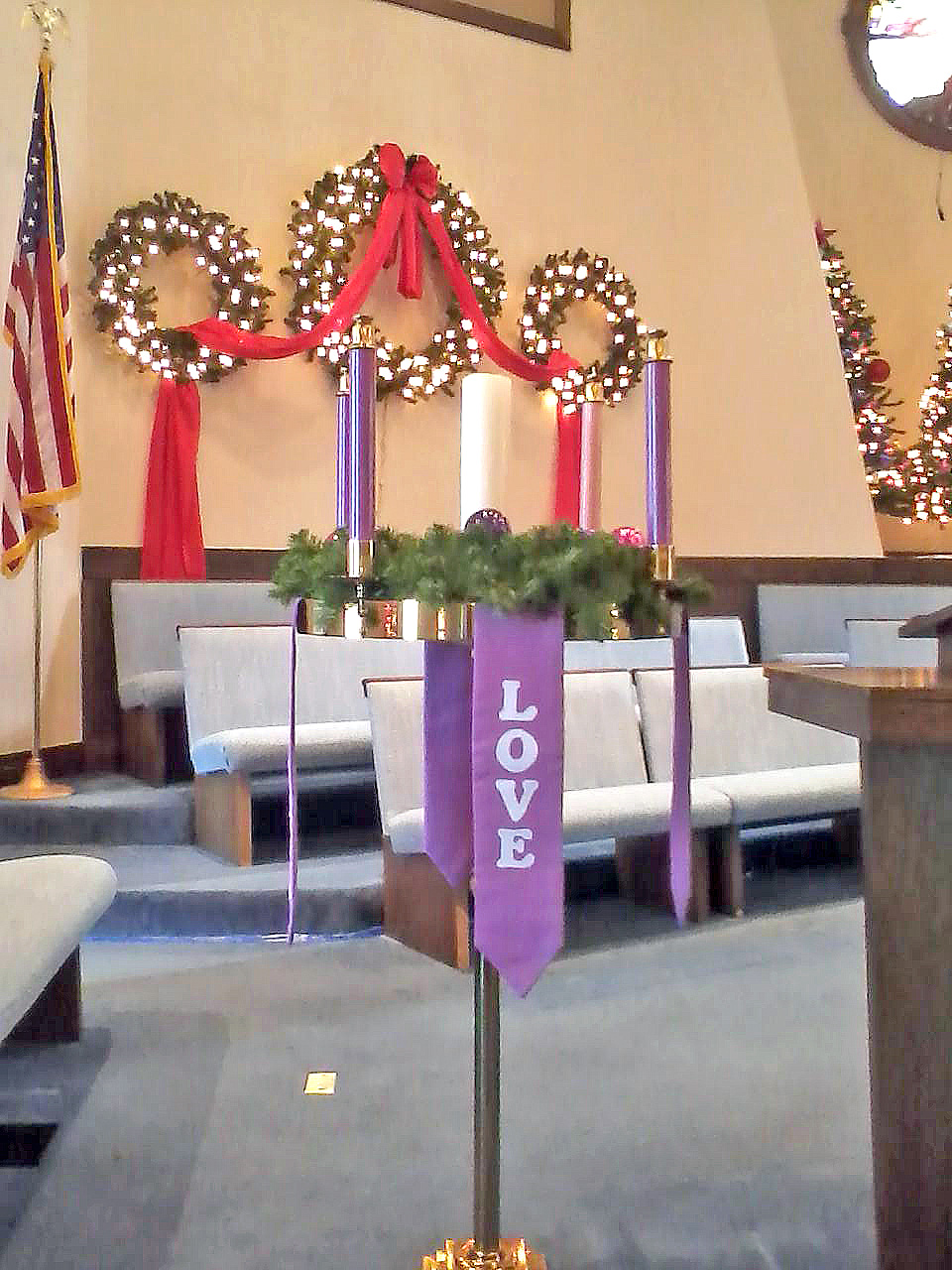
On Christmas, the Christ Candle in the center of the Advent wreath is traditionally lit in many church services.

Christian Churches celebrate the Nativity of Jesus on Christmas, which is marked on December 25 by the Western Christian Churches, while many Eastern Christian Churches celebrate the Feast of the Nativity of Our Lord on January 7 (in 20th and 21st century). This is not a disagreement over the date of Christmas as such, but rather a preference of which calendar (Gregorian or Julian) should be used to determine the day that is December 25. In the Council of Tours of 567, the Church, with its desire to be universal, "declared the twelve days between Christmas and Epiphany to be one unified festal cycle"; at this time, the disagreement was caused by using lunar calendars in Eastern provinces of the Empire. The liturgical season of Advent precedes, and is used to prepare for the celebration of Christmas. Customs of the Christmas season include completing an Advent daily devotional and Advent wreath, carol singing, gift giving, seeing Nativity plays, attending church services, and eating special food, such as Christmas cake. In many countries, such as Sweden, people start to set up their Advent and Christmas decorations on the first day of Advent. Liturgically, this is done in some parishes through a hanging of the greens ceremony.

=== History of feasts and liturgical elements ===
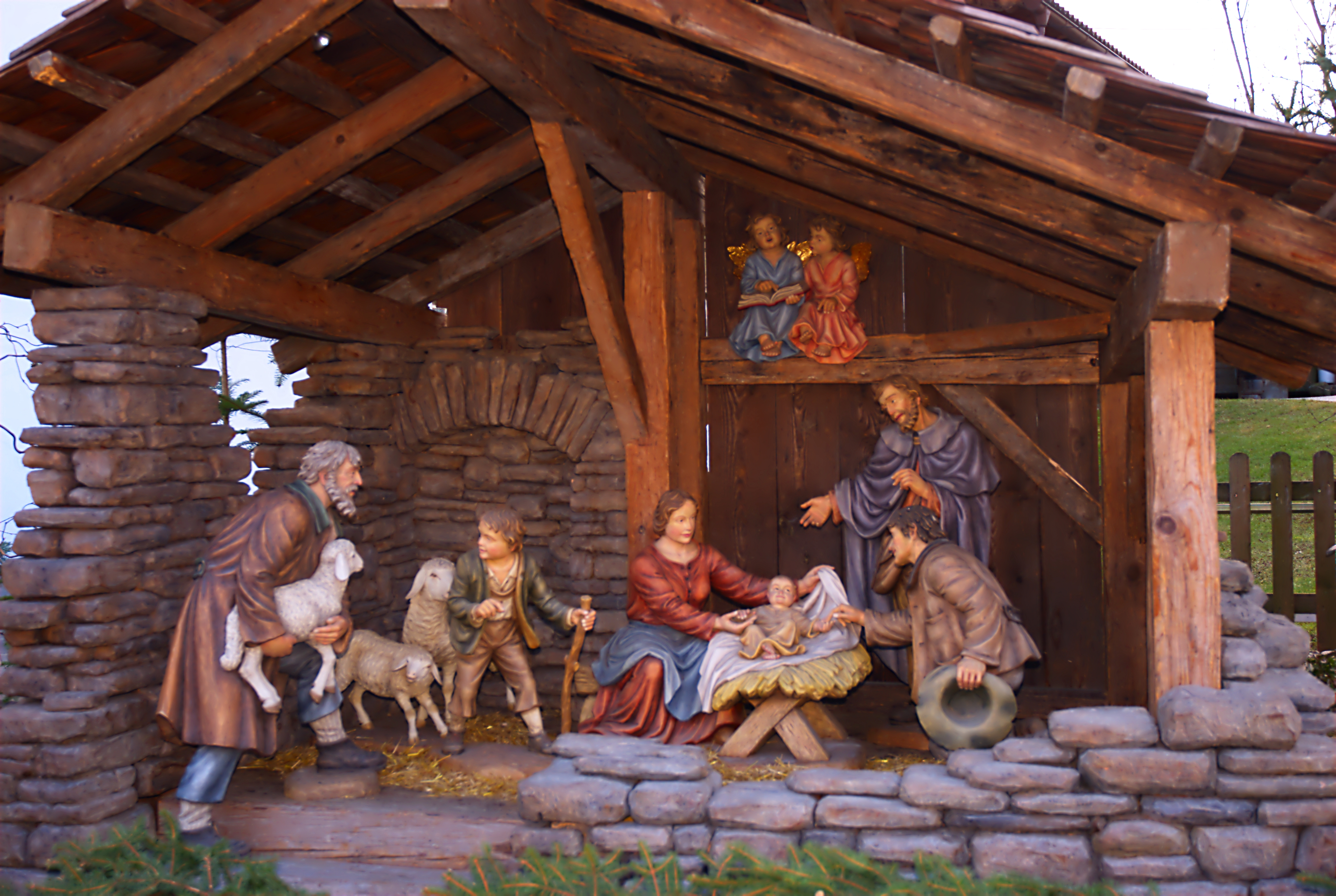
Nativity scene in Baumkirchen, Austria

In the 1st and 2nd centuries, the Lord's Day (Sunday) was the earliest Christian celebration and included a number of theological themes. In the 2nd century, the Resurrection of Jesus became a separate feast as Easter and in the same century Epiphany began to be celebrated in the Churches of the East on January 6. The celebration of the feast of the Magi on January 6 may relate to a pre-Christian celebration for the blessing of the Nile in Egypt on January 5, but this is not historically certain. The festival of the Nativity which later turned into Christmas was a 4th-century feast in the Western Church notably in Rome and North Africa, although it is uncertain exactly where and when it was first celebrated.

The earliest source stating December 25 as the date of birth of Jesus was Hippolytus of Rome (170–236), written very early in the 3rd century, based on the assumption that the conception of Jesus took place at the Spring equinox which he placed on March 25, and then added nine months. There is historical evidence that by the middle of the 4th century the Christian churches of the East celebrated the birth and Baptism of Jesus on the same day, on January 6, while those in the West celebrated a Nativity feast on December 25 (perhaps influenced by the Winter solstice); and that by the last quarter of the 4th century, the calendars of both churches included both feasts. The earliest suggestions of a feast of the Baptism of Jesus on January 6 during the 2nd century comes from Clement of Alexandria, but there is no further mention of such a feast until 361 when Emperor Julian attended a feast on January 6 in the year 361.

The Chronography of 354 illuminated manuscript compiled in Rome includes an early reference to the celebration of a Nativity feast. In a sermon delivered in Antioch on December 25, c. 386, John Chrysostom provides specific information about the feast there, stating that the feast had existed for about 10 years. By around 385 the feast for the birth of Jesus was distinct from that of the Baptism and was held on December 25 in Constantinople, Nyssa and Amaseia. In a sermon in 386, Gregory of Nyssa specifically related the feast of Nativity with that of the martyrdom of Saint Stephen, celebrated a day later. By 390 the feast was also held in Iconium on that day.

Pope Leo I established a feast of the "Mystery of Incarnation" in the 5th century, in effect as the first formal feast for the Nativity of Jesus. Pope Sixtus III then instituted the practice of Midnight Mass just before that feast. The feast was celebrated in Jerusalem by the 6th century, when Emperor Justinian declared Christmas to be a legal holiday.

In the 14th and 15th centuries, the theological importance of the Nativity of Jesus was coupled with an emphasis on the loving nature of the child Jesus in sermons by figures such as Jean Gerson. In his sermons Gerson emphasized the loving nature of Jesus at his Nativity, as well as his cosmic plan for the salvation of mankind.

By the early part of the 20th century, Christmas had become a "cultural signature" of Christianity and indeed of the Western culture even in countries such as the United States which are officially non-religious. By the beginning of the 21st century these countries began to pay more attention to the sensitivities of non-Christians during the festivities at the end of the calendar year.

=== Transforming the image of Jesus ===
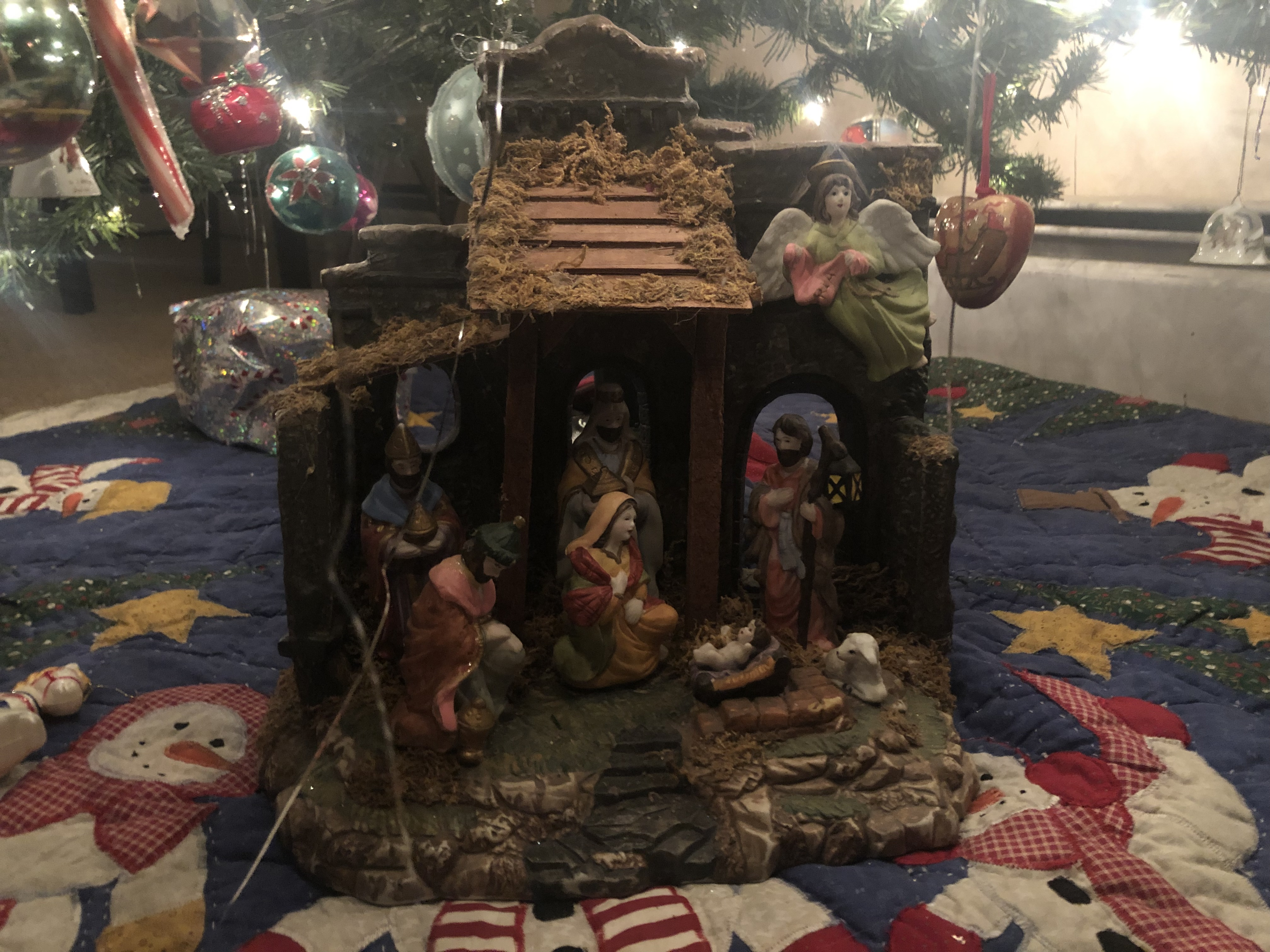
A Nativity scene inside an American home

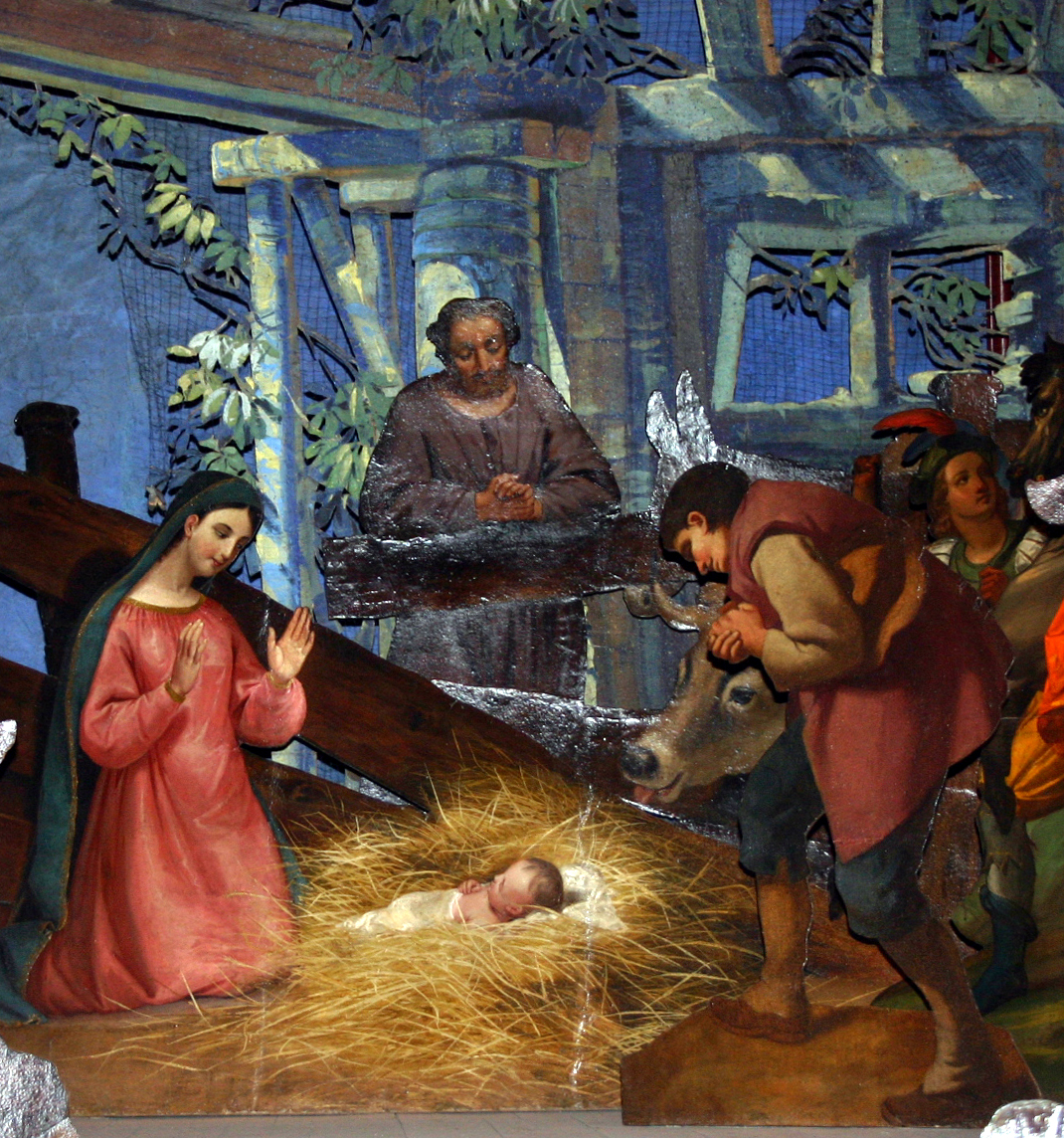
Paper on wood Nativity scene from 1750, Milan, presenting a tender image of Jesus

Early Christians viewed Jesus as "the Lord" and the word Kyrios appears over 700 times in the New Testament, referring to him as such. The use of the word Kyrios in the Septuagint Bible also assigned to Jesus the Old Testament attributes of an omnipotent God. The use of the term Kyrios, and hence the Lordship of Jesus, pre-dated the Pauline epistles, but Paul expanded and elaborated on the topic.

Pauline writings established among early Christians the Kyrios image, and attributes of Jesus as not only referring to his eschatological victory, but to him as the "divine image" (Greek εἰκών, eikōn) in whose face the glory of God shines forth. This image persisted among Christians as the predominant perception of Jesus for a number of centuries. More than any other title, Kyrios defined the relationship between Jesus and those who believed in him as Christ: Jesus was their Lord and Master who was to be served with all their hearts and who would one day judge their actions throughout their lives.

The lordship attributes associated with the Kyrios image of Jesus also implied his power over all creation. Paul then looked back and reasoned that the final lordship of Jesus was prepared from the very beginning, starting with pre-existence and the Nativity, based on his obedience as the image of God. Over time, based on the influence of Anselm of Canterbury, Bernard of Clairvaux and others, the Kyrios image of Jesus began to be supplemented with a more "tender image of Jesus", and the Franciscan approach to popular piety was instrumental in establishing this image.

The 13th century witnessed a major turning point in the development of a new "tender image of Jesus" within Christianity, as the Franciscans began to emphasize the humility of Jesus both at his birth and his death. The construction of the Nativity scene by Francis of Assisi was instrumental in portraying a softer image of Jesus that contrasted with the powerful and radiant image at the Transfiguration, and emphasized how God had taken a humble path to his own birth. As the Black Death raged in medieval Europe, the two mendicant orders of Franciscans and Dominicans helped the faithful cope with tragedies. One element of the Franciscan approach was the emphasis on the humility of Jesus and the poverty of his birth: the image of God was the image of Jesus, not a severe and punishing God, but himself humble at birth and sacrificed at death. The concept that the omnipotent Creator would set aside all power in order to conquer the hearts of men by love and that he would have been helplessly placed in a manger was as marvelous and as touching to the believers as the sacrifice of dying on the cross in Calvary.

Thus by the 13th century the tender joys of the Nativity of Jesus were added to the agony of his Crucifixion and a whole new range of approved religious emotions was ushered in, with wide-ranging cultural impacts for centuries thereafter. The Franciscans approached both ends of this spectrum of emotions. On one hand the introduction of the Nativity scene encouraged the tender image of Jesus, while on the other hand Francis of Assisi himself had a deep attachment to the sufferings of Jesus on the Cross and was said to have received the stigmata as an expression of that love. The dual nature of Franciscan piety based both on joy of Nativity and the sacrifice at Calvary had a deep appeal among city dwellers and as the Franciscan Friars travelled these emotions spread across the world, transforming the Kyrios image of Jesus to a more tender, loving, and compassionate image. These traditions did not remain limited to Europe and soon spread to the other parts of the world such as Latin America, the Philippines and the United States.

According to Archbishop Rowan Williams, this transformation, accompanied by the proliferation of the tender image of Jesus in Madonna and Child paintings, made an important impact within the Christian ministry by allowing Christians to feel the living presence of Jesus as a loving figure "who is always there to harbor and nurture those who turn to him for help".

== Hymns, art and music ==
=== Canticles appearing in Luke ===
Luke's Nativity text has given rise to four well-known canticles: the Benedictus and the Magnificat in the first chapter, and the Gloria in Excelsis and the Nunc dimittis in the second chapter. These "Gospel canticles" are now an integral part of the liturgical tradition. The parallel structure in Luke regarding the births of John the Baptist and Jesus, extends to the three canticles Benedictus (Song of Zechariah), the Nunc dimittis and the Magnificat.

The Magnificat, in Luke 1:46–55, is spoken by Mary and is one of the eight most ancient Christian hymns, perhaps the earliest Marian hymn. The Benedictus, in Luke 1:68–79, is spoken by Zechariah, while the Nunc dimittis, in Luke 2:29–32, is spoken by Simeon. The traditional Gloria in Excelsis is longer than the opening line presented in Luke 2:14, and is often called the "Song of the Angels" given that it was uttered by the angels in the Annunciation to the Shepherds.

The three canticles Benedictus, Nunc Dimittis and the Magnificat, if not originating in the Gospel of Luke, may have their roots in the earliest Christian liturgical services in Jerusalem, but their exact origins remain unknown.

=== Visual arts ===
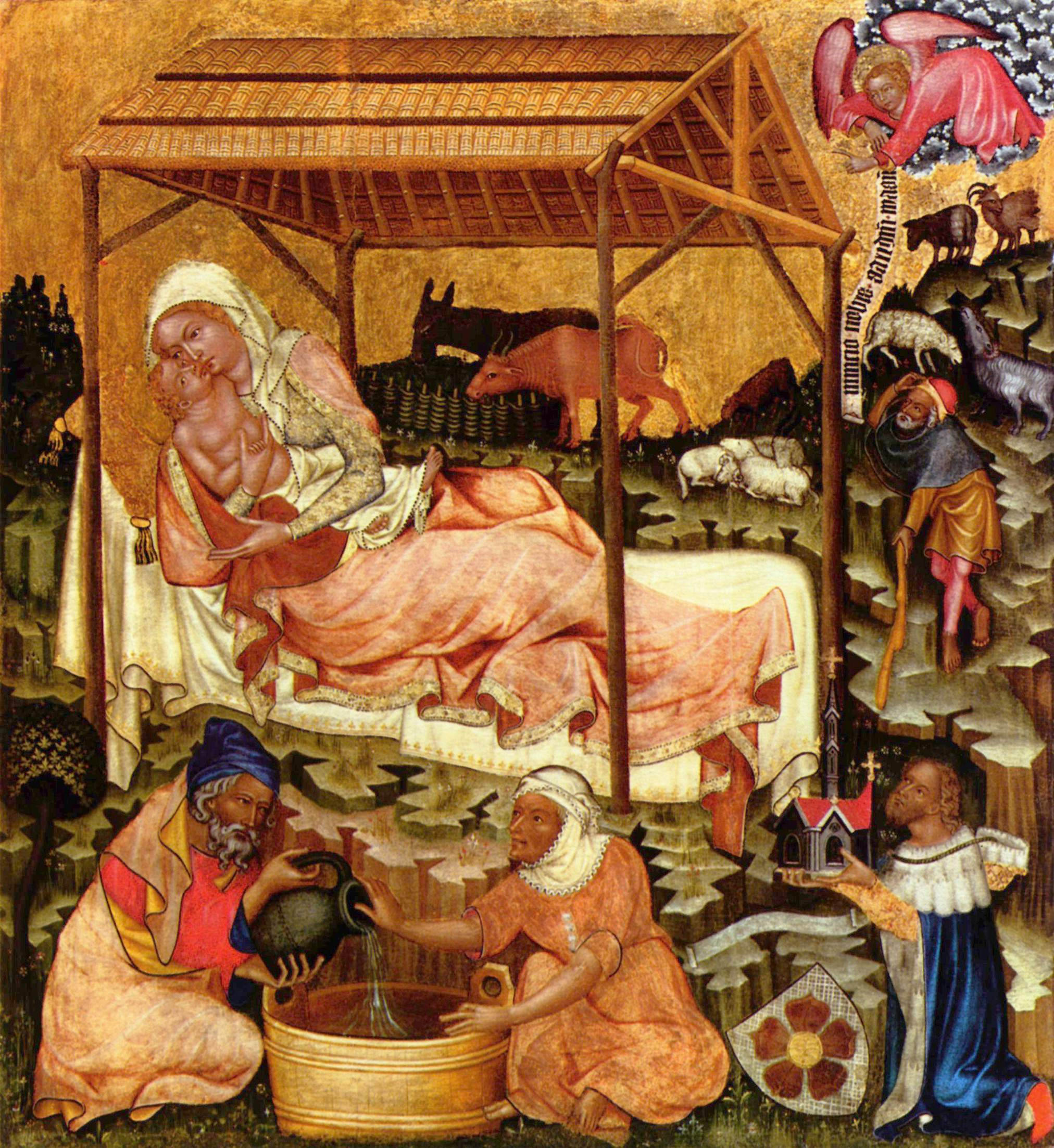
Medieval miniature of the Nativity, c. 1350

One of the most visible traditions during the Christmas season is the display of manger scenes depicting the Nativity, usually in the form of statues or figurines, in private homes, businesses and churches, either inside or outside the building. This tradition is usually attributed to Francis of Assisi who was described as creating such a display at Greccio, Italy, in 1223 as related by St. Bonaventure in his Life of Saint Francis of Assisi written around 1260.

Before the tradition of building and displaying manger scenes developed, there were paintings depicting the subject. The earliest artistic depictions of the Nativity were in the catacombs and on sarcophagi in Rome. As gentile visitors, the Magi were popular in these scenes, representing the significance of the arrival of the Messiah to all peoples. The ox and ass were also taken to symbolize the Jews and the gentiles, and have remained a constant since the earliest depictions. Mary was soon seated on a throne as the Magi visited.

Depictions of the Nativity soon became a normal component of cycles in art illustrating both the Life of Christ and the Life of the Virgin. Nativity images also carry the message of redemption: God's unification with matter forms the mystery of the Incarnation, a turning point in the Christian perspective on Salvation.

In the Eastern Church painted icons of the Nativity often correspond to specific hymns to Mary, e.g. to the Kontakion: "The Virgin today bringeth forth the Transubstantial, and the eart offereth a cave to the Unapproachable." In many Eastern icons of Nativity (often accompanied by matching hymnody) two basic elements are emphasized. First the event portrays the mystery of incarnation as a foundation for the Christian faith, and the combined nature of Christ as divine and human. Secondly, it relates the event to the natural life of the world, and its consequences for humanity.

=== Hymns, music and performances ===
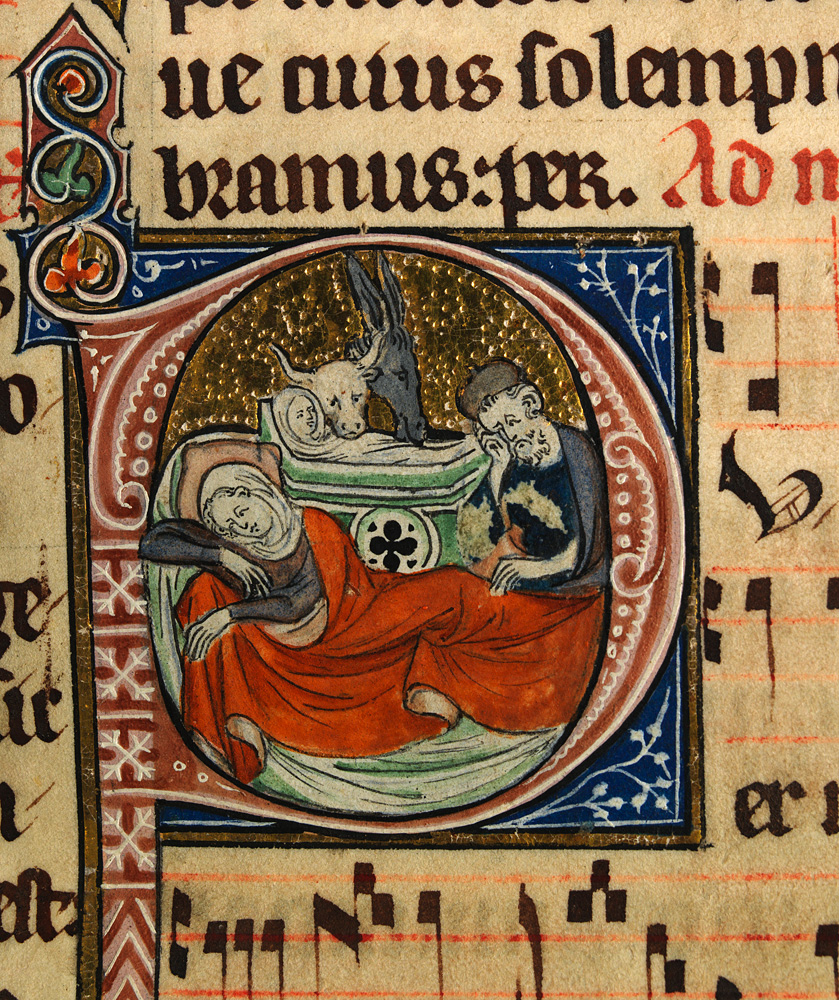
The Nativity depicted in an English liturgical manuscript, c. 1310–1320

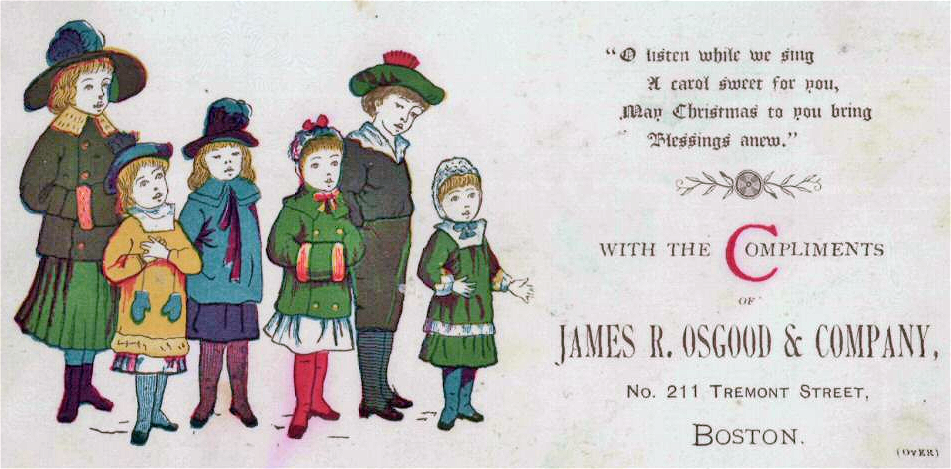
A Christmas carol card, Boston, 1880

Like 1st-century Jews, early Christians rejected the use of musical instruments in religious ceremonies and instead relied on chants and plainsong leading to the use of the term a cappella (in the chapel) for these chants.

One of the earliest Nativity hymns was Veni redemptor gentium composed by Ambrose of Milan in the 4th century. By the beginning of the 5th century, the Spanish poet Prudentius had written "From the Heart of the Father" where the ninth stanza focused on the Nativity and portrayed Jesus as the creator of the universe. In the 5th century the Gallic poet Sedulius composed "From the lands that see the Sun arise" in which the humility of the birth of Jesus was portrayed. The Magnificat, one of the eight most ancient Christian hymns and perhaps the earliest Marian hymn, is based on the Annunciation.

Romanus the Melodist had a dream of the Virgin Mary the night before the feast of the Nativity, and when he woke up the next morning, composed his first hymn "On the Nativity" and continued composing hymns (perhaps several hundred) to the end of his life. Re-enactments of Nativity, which are now called Nativity plays, were part of the troparion hymns in the liturgy of Byzantine Rite churches, from Sophronius of Jerusalem in the 7th century. By the 13th century, the Franciscans had encouraged a strong tradition of popular Christmas songs in the native languages. Christmas carols in English first appear in a 1426 work of John Awdlay, a Shropshire chaplain, who lists twenty-five "caroles of Cristemas".

The largest body of musical works about Christ in which he does not speak are about the Nativity. A large body of liturgical music, as well as a great deal of para-liturgical texts, carols and folk music exist about the Nativity of Jesus. Christmas carols have come to be viewed as a cultural-signature of the Nativity of Jesus.

Most musical Nativity narrations are not biblical and did not come about until church music assimilated opera in the 17th century. However, thereafter there was a torrent of new music, such as Heinrich Schütz's 1660, Marc-Antoine Charpentier (Midnight Mass, Pastorals, Oratorio, instrumental music, 11 settings), The Christmas Story and Bach's Christmas Oratorio in the 18th century, as well as Lisz's Christus, Berlioz's L'Enfance du Christ (1850), Camille Saint-Saëns' Christmas Oratorio (1858), etc. John Milton's classic 1629 poem Ode on the Morning of Christ's Nativity was used by John McEwan in 1901.

== Historical analysis ==
=== Traditional views ===
According to some scholars, the two Gospel accounts of the Nativity are historically accurate and do not contradict each other, with similarities such as the birthplace of Bethlehem and the virgin birth. George Kilpatrick and Michael Patella state that a comparison of the Nativity accounts of Luke and Matthew show common elements in terms of the virgin birth, the birth at Bethlehem, and the upbringing at Nazareth, and that although there are differences in the accounts of the Nativity in Luke and Matthew, a general narrative may be constructed by combining the two. A number of biblical scholars have attempted to show how the text from both narratives can be interwoven as a gospel harmony to create one account that begins with a trip from Nazareth to Bethlehem, where Jesus is born, followed by the flight to Egypt, and ending with a return to Nazareth.

The author of Luke claims to use witness testimonies. Raymond E. Brown suggested in 1973 that Joseph was the source of Matthew's account and Mary of Luke's, but modern scholars consider this "highly unlikely", given that the story emerged so late.

Roman Catholic scholars, such as John L. McKenzie, Raymond E. Brown, and Daniel J. Harrington express the view that due to the scarcity of ancient records, a number of issues regarding the historicity of some Nativity episodes can never be fully determined, and that the more important task is deciding what the Nativity narratives meant to the early Christian communities.

=== Critical analysis ===
Many scholars do not see the Luke and Matthew Nativity stories as historically factual, regarding them as laced with theology and presenting two different accounts and genealogies. For instance, they point to Matthew's account of the appearance of an angel to Joseph in a dream; the wise men from the East; the massacre of the innocents; and the flight to Egypt, which do not appear in Luke, which instead describes the appearance of an angel to Mary; the Roman census; the birth in a manger; and the choir of angels appearing to the shepherds in the fields. Sanders considers Luke's census, for which everyone returned to their ancestral home, not historically credible, as this was contrary to Roman practice; they would not have uprooted everyone from their homes and farms in the Empire by forcing them to return to their ancestral cities. Moreover, people were not able to trace their own lineages back 42 generations. In Luke's account, Robert J. Miller considered the young Mary's long trip to visit Elizabeth as being unrealistic. More generally, according to Karl Rahner the gospels show little interest in synchronizing the episodes of the birth or subsequent life of Jesus with the secular history of the age. As a result, modern scholars do not use much of the birth narratives for historical information. Nevertheless, they are considered to contain some useful biographical information: Jesus being born near the end of the reign of Herod, during the reign of Emperor Augustus and his father being named Joseph are considered historically plausible.

Most modern scholars accept the Marcan priority hypothesis, that the Luke and Matthew accounts are based on the Gospel of Mark. The popular two-source hypothesis posits that the birth narratives are not a single coherent narrative and do not share sources. A growing number of scholars defend the Farrer hypothesis where Luke used Matthew as a source or the Matthean Posteriority hypothesis where Matthew was aware of Luke.

While Géza Vermes and E. P. Sanders dismiss the accounts as pious fiction, Raymond E. Brown sees them as having been constructed from historical traditions which predate the Gospels. According to Brown, there is no uniform agreement among scholars on the historicity of the accounts, e.g., most of those scholars who reject the historicity of the birth at Bethlehem argue for a birth at Nazareth, a few suggest Capernaum, and others have hypothesized locations as far away as Chorazin. Dale Allison and W. D. Davies also argue that Matthew presents a unified and preexisting infancy narrative based on stories about Moses, though they maintain that elements in the story such as the names of Mary and Joseph and Jesus being in Nazareth during Herod’s reign are historical. Bruce Chilton and archaeologist Aviram Oshri have proposed a birth at Bethlehem of Galilee, a site located 7 mi (11 km) from Nazareth at which remains dating to the time of Herod the Great have been excavated. Armand P. Tarrech states that Chilton's hypothesis has no support in either the Jewish or Christian sources, although Chilton seems to take seriously the statement in Luke 2:4 that Joseph also went up from Galilee, out of the city of Nazareth, into Judaea, to the city of David, which is called Bethlehem.

Many view the discussion of historicity as secondary, given that gospels were primarily written as theological documents rather than chronological timelines. For instance, Matthew pays far more attention to the name of the child and its theological implications than the actual birth event itself.

Thomas O'Loughlin concludes:

Each year, it seems, someone comes up with yet another 'solution' to some puzzle in the infancy narratives of Matthew or Luke. We have to resist the temptation to grasp at these straws and remember that the whole narrative...will never 'add up' logically. Therefore, imagining that we have a solution to some bit of the memory is to forget what the memory is (namely, our earliest liturgical recollection) and to confuse it with a historical account.

== See also ==
- Christ Child – Depiction of Jesus up to the age of 12
- Chronology of Jesus
- Jesus in Christianity – Son of God in Christianity
- Life of Jesus in the New Testament – Part of the New Testament
- Marian art in the Catholic Church – Iconographic depiction of Virgin Mary in Catholic Churches
- Matthew 2:23
- Nativity of Mary – Christian feast day for the birth of Mary
- Nativity of Saint John the Baptist – Christian feast day celebrating the birth of John the Baptist
- Race and appearance of Jesus
- Saint Joseph's dreams

== Notes ==
Nativity of Jesus Life of Jesus
Preceded by Mary visits Elizabeth	New Testament; Events	Succeeded by Annunciation to the shepherds
