= Return of the family of Jesus to Nazareth =

Event in the life of Jesus given in the canonical gospels

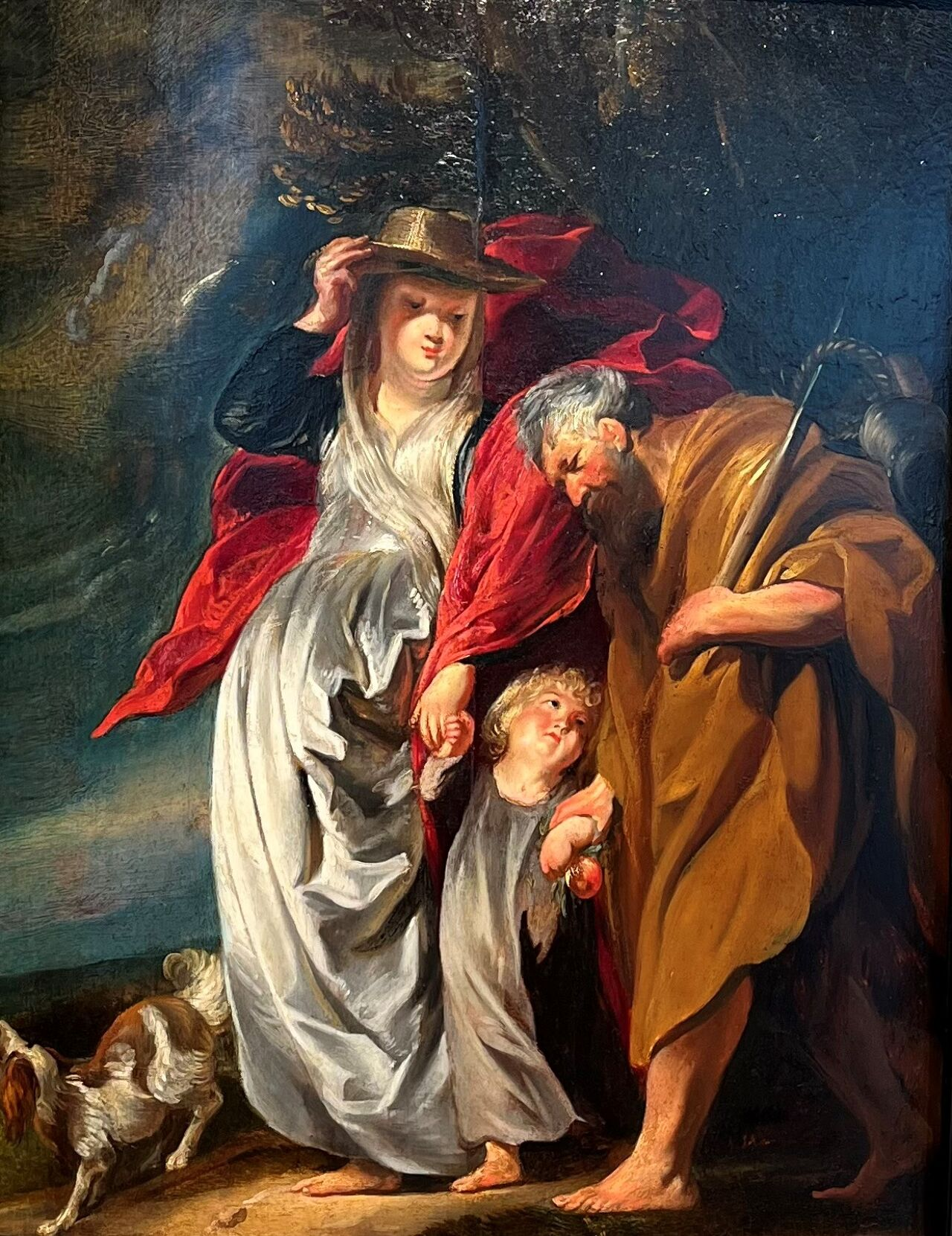
The Return of the Holy Family from the Flight into Egypt by Jacob Jordaens, c. 1618–1620

The return of the family of Jesus to Nazareth, also known as the return from Egypt, appears in the reports of the early life of Jesus given in the canonical gospels. Both of the gospels which describe the nativity of Jesus agree that he was born in Bethlehem and then later moved with his family to live in Nazareth. The Gospel of Matthew describes how Joseph, Mary, and Jesus went to Egypt to escape from Herod the Great's slaughter of the baby boys in Bethlehem. Matthew does not mention Nazareth as being the previous home of Joseph and Mary; he says that Joseph was afraid to go to Judea because Herod Archelaus was ruling there and so the family went to Nazareth instead. The Gospel of Luke, on the other hand, does not record the flight to Egypt, and says that Joseph had been previously living in Nazareth, and returned there after the Presentation of Jesus at the Temple.

== Return from Egypt ==
Sometime after Herod had died, the holy family returns from Egypt. Most scholarship places the date of Herod's death around 4 AD.

Upon learning that Herod Archelaus had succeeded his father in Judea, they continued on to Galilee. Archelaus was known for his cruelty and in response to complaints from the populace, in 6 AD he was deposed by Augustus and banished to Vienne in Gaul. Galilee was ruled by Archelaus's brother, Herod Antipas.

== Significance ==
In Matthew 2:23, the return to Nazareth is said to be a fulfilment of the prophetic word, "He shall be called a Nazarene". It is not clear which Old Testament verse Matthew might have had in mind; many commentators suggest it is Isaiah 11:1, where it says "A shoot will come up from the stump of Jesse; from his roots a Branch will bear fruit" (NIV): the Hebrew word for "branch" is nezer.

Cornelius a Lapide comments on this issue, writing: "In Hebrew nazir, or nozeri, written with zain, meaning separate, holy, consecrate, crowned, religious, because Christ, as man, being separated from every other thing, was hypostatically and wholly united to the WORD. For the word nazar signifies to separate, to consecrate, to crown. Wherefore the religious, under the old law, who separated themselves from wine and from the world, and consecrated themselves to God, were called Nazarites. (See Numb. 6:2, seq.) But that Christ would be holy, and consecrated to God, all the prophets foretold, especially Daniel (9:24): “The Holy of Holies—i.e., Christ—shall be anointed.” (Vulgate) Thus, too, Samson, who was a type of Christ, was a Nazarite. (Judg. 13:7.) So, too, was Joseph. (Gen. 49:2) And as Joseph, after his imprisonment, was made lord of Egypt, so Christ, after His death, was made lord of the universe. So S. Ambrose and Ruperti."

== Liturgical commemoration ==
The 1956 Martyrologium Romanum lists the commemoration of "the bringing back of the Child Jesus from Egypt" on 7 January.

== In art ==
The family's return journey from Egypt has frequently been a subject of artistic representation.

== Commentary ==
Some Bible scholars had noted differences in the birth narrative story of the flight. Raymond E. Brown claimed that the narratives are "...contrary to each other in a number of details."

== See also ==
- Flight into Egypt

Return of the family of Jesus to Nazareth Life of Jesus
Preceded by Massacre of the Innocents	New Testament; Events	Succeeded by Finding Jesus in the Temple
