= The Return of the Holy Family from the Flight into Egypt =

c. 1618–1620 painting by Jacob Jordaens

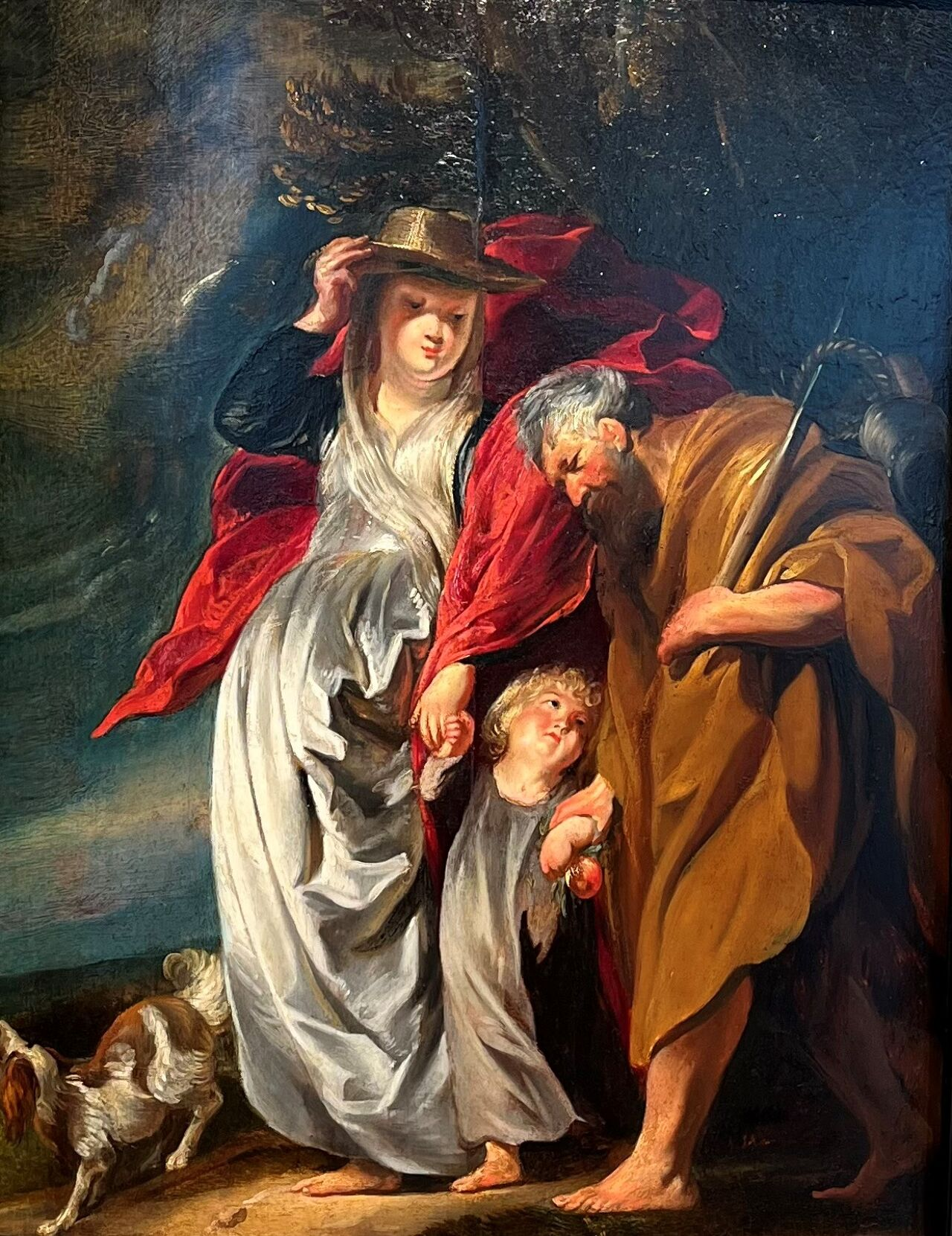
- Artist: Jacob Jordaens
- Year: c. 1618 – c. 1620
- Medium: oil on canvas
- Subject: Return of the family of Jesus to Nazareth
- Owner: Private collection, descendants of Joseph Scheppers de Bergstein

The Return of the Holy Family from the Flight into Egypt (Dutch: De terugkeer van de Heilige Familie van de vlucht naar Egypte) is an oil painting by Jacob Jordaens, created around 1618 to 1620. It depicts the return of the family of Jesus to Nazareth. The painting was plundered by Nazi soldiers in 1940, before being restituted to the descendants of its original owner Joseph Scheppers de Bergstein, a Belgian resistance fighter, in 2025.

== Composition ==
The painting depicts the Biblical event of the return of the family of Jesus to Nazareth. Mary, seen in a flamboyant dress, is holding the hand of the Christ Child, who is also holding the hand of Joseph, who is arching towards the child.

== Provenance ==
=== Dating ===
The painting is dated to have been painted by Jordaens around 1618 to 1620.

=== Theft ===
Prior to its theft, the painting was in the possession of Belgian resistance fighter Joseph Scheppers de Bergstein. Scheppers de Bergstein fought in the 18 Days' Campaign before being captured and sent to Buchenwald concentration camp. After managing to return to his home, the Emmaüs Castle in Mechelen, the artworks there had either been plundered or burnt. Scheppers de Bergstein would later fight in the Secret Army before being captured again and sent to the Mittelbau-Dora concentration camp, where he would die on October 12, 1944. As the whereabouts of the painting were unknown following the conclusion of the war, Joseph's son Gaëtan would send a report to the Economic Recovery Service, which would end up with the painting being listed on a Belgian government website for stolen art.

=== Recovery ===
In 2022, the painting was rediscovered in the basement of a Dutchman after he confided to his family shortly before his death of the paintings existence. The family then managed to trace the painting to the descendants of Scheppers de Bergstein, with the process facilitated by the Federal Public Service Economy. Following restoration work on the painting, the descendants formally received it in a ceremony held in the Kazerne Dossin Memorial, Museum and Documentation Center in February 2025.

== Other versions ==
Two other versions of the painting are extant, one held in the Gemäldegalerie, Berlin and the other in the Rhode Island School of Design Museum.

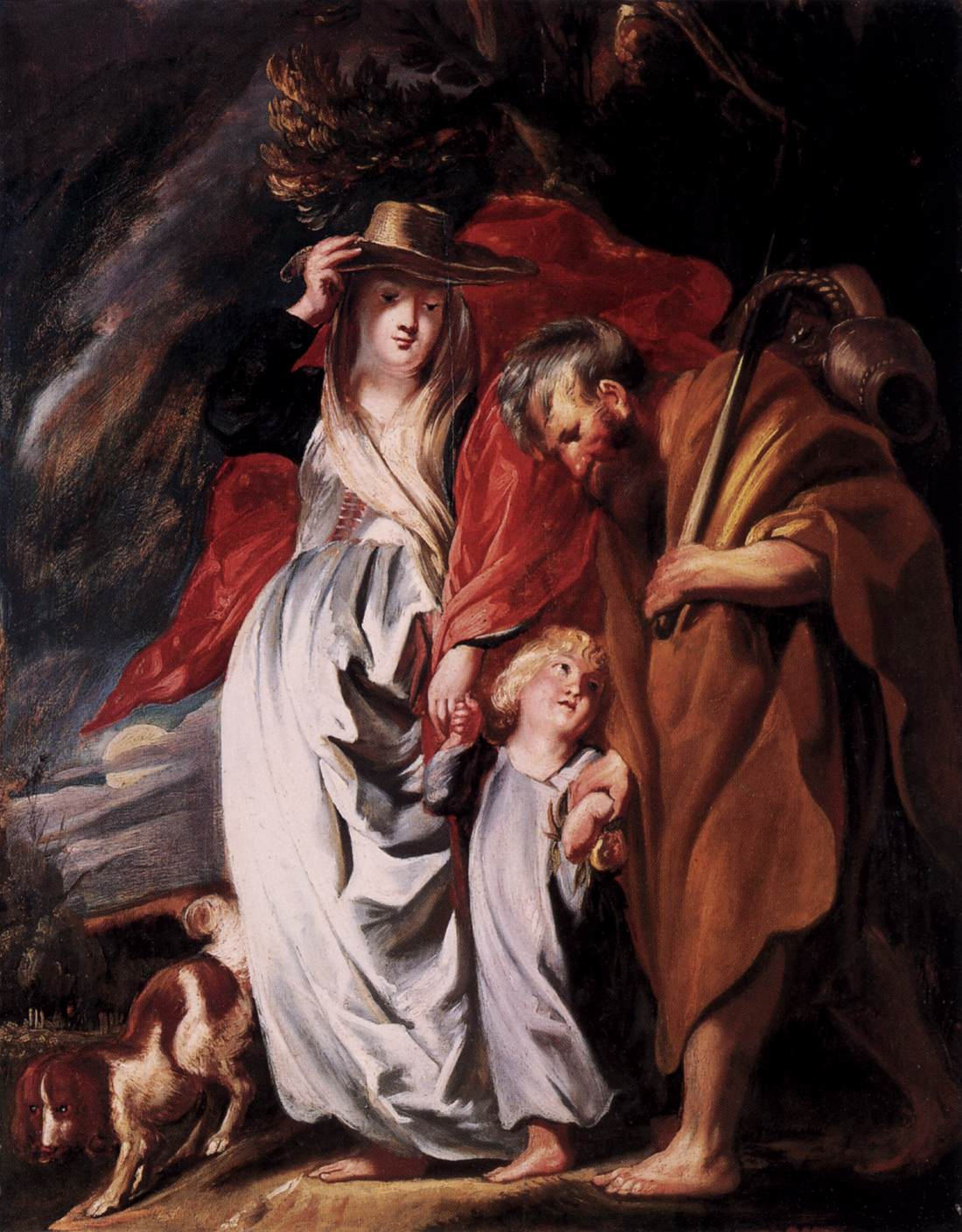
Version of the painting kept in Berlin

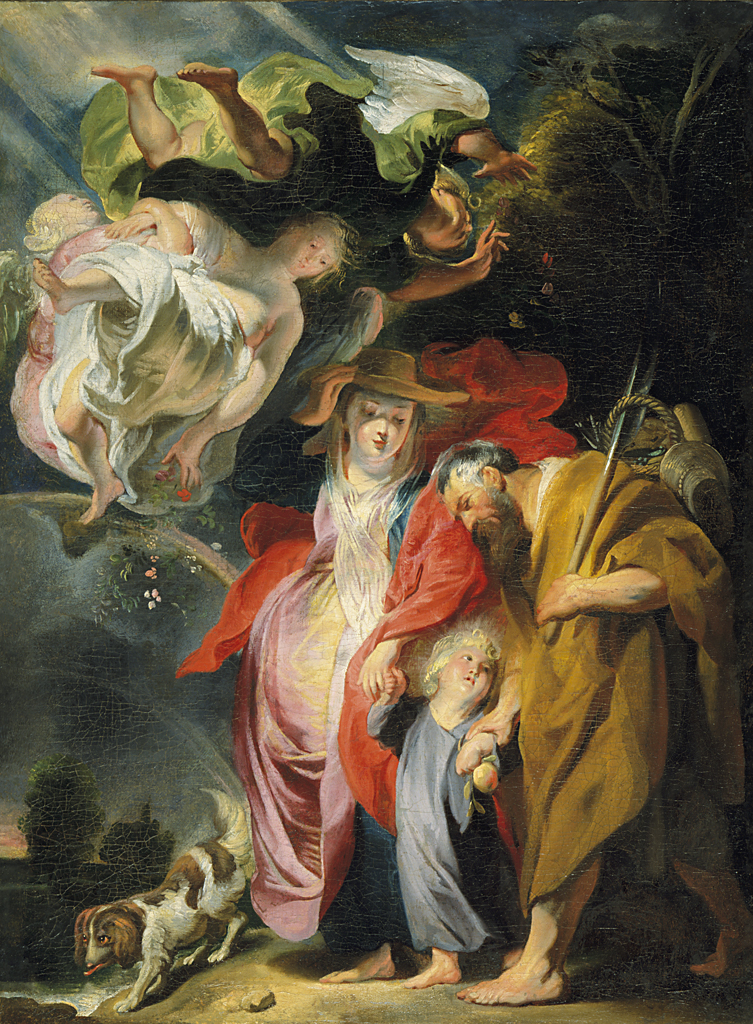
Version of the painting kept in Rhode Island
