= Matthew 1:22 =

- ← 1:21 1:23 →
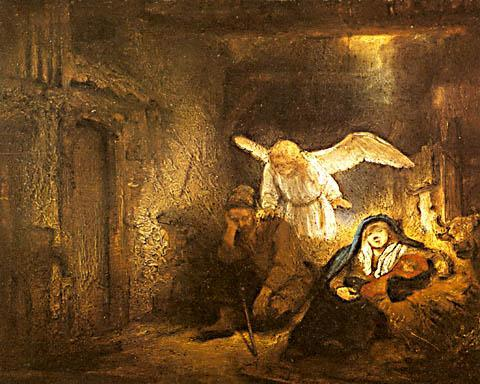
- Rembrandt's Joseph's Dream in the Stable painted in 1645
- Book: Gospel of Matthew
- Christian Bible part: New Testament

Matthew 1:22 is the twenty-second verse of the first chapter of the Gospel of Matthew in the New Testament. Joseph has just been spoken to in a dream by an angel.

== Content ==
The original Koine Greek, according to Westcott and Hort, reads:

τουτο δε ολον γεγονεν ινα πληρωθη το ρηθεν
υπο κυριου δια του προφητου λεγοντος

In the King James Version of the Bible the text reads:

Now all this was done, that it might be fulfilled which
was spoken of the Lord by the prophet, saying,

The World English Bible translates the passage as:

Now all this has happened, that it might be fulfilled
which was spoken by the Lord through the prophet, saying,

For a collection of other versions see BibleHub Matthew 1:22.

== Analysis ==
This verse sets up a quote from Isaiah 7:14 that appears in the following verse. Brown notes that in some alternate manuscripts this verse actually contains Isaiah's name. This is the first of ten quotes from the Old Testament that appear in Matthew to illustrate how Jesus was foretold by the prophets. The Gospel of Matthew is far more concerned than the others in proving that Jesus is the Messiah spoken of in the Old Testament. The phrase "that it might be fulfilled" is Matthew's standard introduction to these quotes. Boring notes that this verse is also the first of many times that a narrator takes an active role in the Gospel, something that will also continue throughout.

That the name of the prophet in question is not mentioned is generally considered because of its irrelevance to Christology. Carter disagrees with this and argues that it is because the intended audience of the verse would have immediately known which prophet the quote came from and would need no extra information.

== Commentary from the Church Fathers ==
Saint Remigius: It is the custom of the Evangelist to confirm what he says out of the Old Testament, for the sake of those Jews who believed on Christ, that they might recognize as fulfilled in the grace of the Gospel, the things that were foretold in the Old Testament; therefore he adds, Now all this was done. Here we must enquire why he should say all this was done, when above he has only related the conception. It should be known that he says this to show, that in the presence of God all this was done before it was done among men. Or he says, all this was done, because he is relating past events; for when he wrote, it was all done.

Glossa Ordinaria: Or, he says, all this was done, meaning, the Virgin was betrothed, she was kept chaste, she was found with child, the revelation was made by the Angel, that it might be fulfilled which was spoken. For that the Virgin should conceive and should bring forth would never have been fulfilled, had she not been espoused that she should not be stoned; and had not her secret been disclosed by the Angel, and so Joseph taken her unto him, that she was not dismissed to disgrace and to perish by stoning. So had she perished before the birth, that prophecy would have been made void which says, She shall bring forth a Son. (Isa. 7:14.)

Glossa Ordinaria: Or it may be said, that the word that does not here denote the cause; for the prophecy was not fulfilled merely because it was to be fulfilled. But it is put consecutively, as in Genesis, He hung the other on the gallows, that the truth of the interpreter might be proved; (Gen. 40:22.) since by the weighing of one, truth is established. So also in this place we must understand it as if it were, that which was foretold being done, the prophecy was accomplished.

Chrysostom: Otherwise; the Angel seeing the depths of the Divine mercy, the laws of nature broken through and reconciliation made, He who was above all made lower than all; all these wonders, all this he comprises in that one saying, Now all this hath happened; as though he had said, Do not suppose that this is newly devised of God, it was determined of old. And he rightly cites the Prophet not to the Virgin, who as a maiden was untaught in such things, but to Joseph, as to one much versed in the Prophets. And at first he had spoken of Mary as thy wife, but now in the words of the Prophet he brings in the word “Virgin,” that he might hear this from the Prophet, as a thing long before determined. Therefore to confirm what he had said, he introduces Isaiah, or rather God; for he does not say, Which was spoken by Isaiah, but, Which was spoken of the Lord by the Prophet.

== Bibliography ==
- Albright, W.F. and C.S. Mann. "Matthew." The Anchor Bible Series. New York: Doubleday & Company, 1971.

Preceded by Matthew 1:21	Gospel of Matthew; Chapter 1	Succeeded by Matthew 1:23
