= Judah's revolts against Babylon =

601–586 BCE conflict between the Kingdom of Judah and the Neo-Babylonian Empire

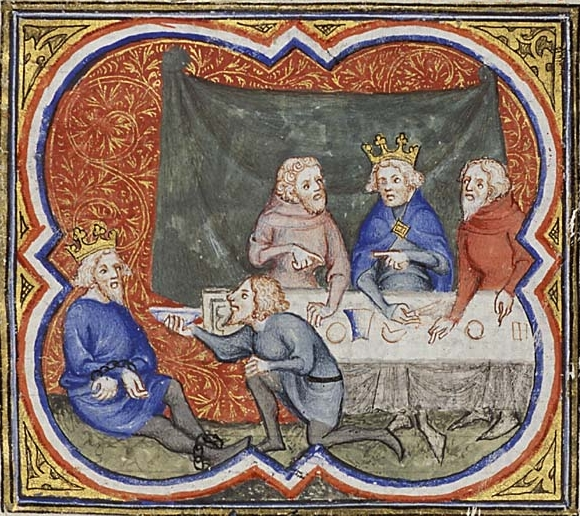
- Zedekiah is chained and brought before Nebuchadnezzar II, from Petrus Comestor's Bible Historiale (1372)
Date	601–586 BCE
Location	Kingdom of Judah (including Jerusalem)
Result	Babylonian victory; Destruction of Solomon's Temple; Beginning of the Babylonian captivity

Belligerents
Kingdom of Judah; Supported by: Twenty-sixth Egyptian dynasty	Neo-Babylonian Empire; Supported by: Kingdom of Moab; Kingdom of Ammon; Chaldea

Commanders and leaders
Jehoiakim (executed); Jehoiachin (surrendered); Zedekiah (POW); Pashur Ben-Amar; Jehuchal Ben-Shelamiah; Gedaliah Ben-Pashur; Sefaniah Ben-Masiah; Shefatiah Ben-Matan; Pashur Ben-Malkiah; Supported by: Necho II; Psamtik II; Apries	Nebuchadnezzar II; Nebuzaradan

Strength
Much fewer	Unknown

Casualties and losses
More than 4,200 captive, many slain	Unknown
- Based on 2 Kings 24 and 25 of the Hebrew Bible and Old Testament

Judah's revolts against Babylon (601–586 BCE) were attempts by the Kingdom of Judah to escape dominance by the Neo-Babylonian Empire. Resulting in a Babylonian victory and the destruction of the Kingdom of Judah, it marked the beginning of the prolonged hiatus in Jewish self-rule in Judaea until the Maccabean Revolt of the 2nd century BCE. Babylonian forces captured the capital city of Jerusalem and destroyed Solomon's Temple, completing the fall of Judah, an event which marked the beginning of the Babylonian captivity, a period in Jewish history in which a large number of Judeans were forcibly removed from Judah and resettled in Mesopotamia (rendered in the Bible simply as "Babylon").

== Background ==
Egypt was the regional power until the Battle of Charchamesh around 606 BCE. Later, Babylonia came and ended the Egyptian rule, established its own dominance, and made Judah its vassal.

== First revolt ==
According to the Hebrew Bible, for three years, Judah paid taxes to Babylonia until King Jehoiakim decided to stop the payments and went to war with Babylonia. Moab, Ammon and Chaldea went to war against Judah alongside Babylonia. (2 Kings 24).

Nebuchadnezzar besieged Jerusalem in 597 BCE and managed to capture the city and King Jehoiachin (Jehoiakim's son), along with all of the aristocracy of Jerusalem. He then looted the treasures of the Solomon's Temple, including the golden implements. Nebuchadnezzar exiled 10,000 of the officers, the craftsmen, and 7,000 soldiers, after which he appointed Jehoiachin's uncle, Mattaniah, as king of Judah. Following this, Mattaniah changed his name to Zedekiah.

== Second revolt ==
In July 587 BCE, Zedekiah rebelled against Babylonia, making an alliance with Egypt, and Nebuchadnezzar besieged Jerusalem again, starving the people (2 Kings 25). Later, the Babylonian troops managed to get inside the walls and conquer the city, yet Zedekiah and some of his troops managed to escape to Jericho, where they fought against the Babylonians (called Chaldeans by the Bible), who captured Zedekiah and his sons and brought them in chains to Babylonia, where Zedekiah's children were executed in front of him.

On the seventh day of Av, Nebuzaradan, captain of Nebuchadnezzar's body guard, burned down Solomon's Temple, destroyed the walls of Jerusalem, and exiled the rest of the Jews to Babylonia. He appointed Gedalia as the administrator of the Jews that were not exiled from Judah. Judah ceased to exist a year later, in 586 BCE. Gedalia was murdered in 582 BCE.

== See also ==
- List of conflicts in the Near East

== Bibliography ==
- Hebrew Bible: 2 Kings 24–25, Book of Jeremiah, Book of Ezekiel, 2 Chronicles 36
- Nebuchadnezzar Chronicle
