= Jeremiah 37 =

Book of Jeremiah, chapter 37

- ← chapter 36 chapter 38 →
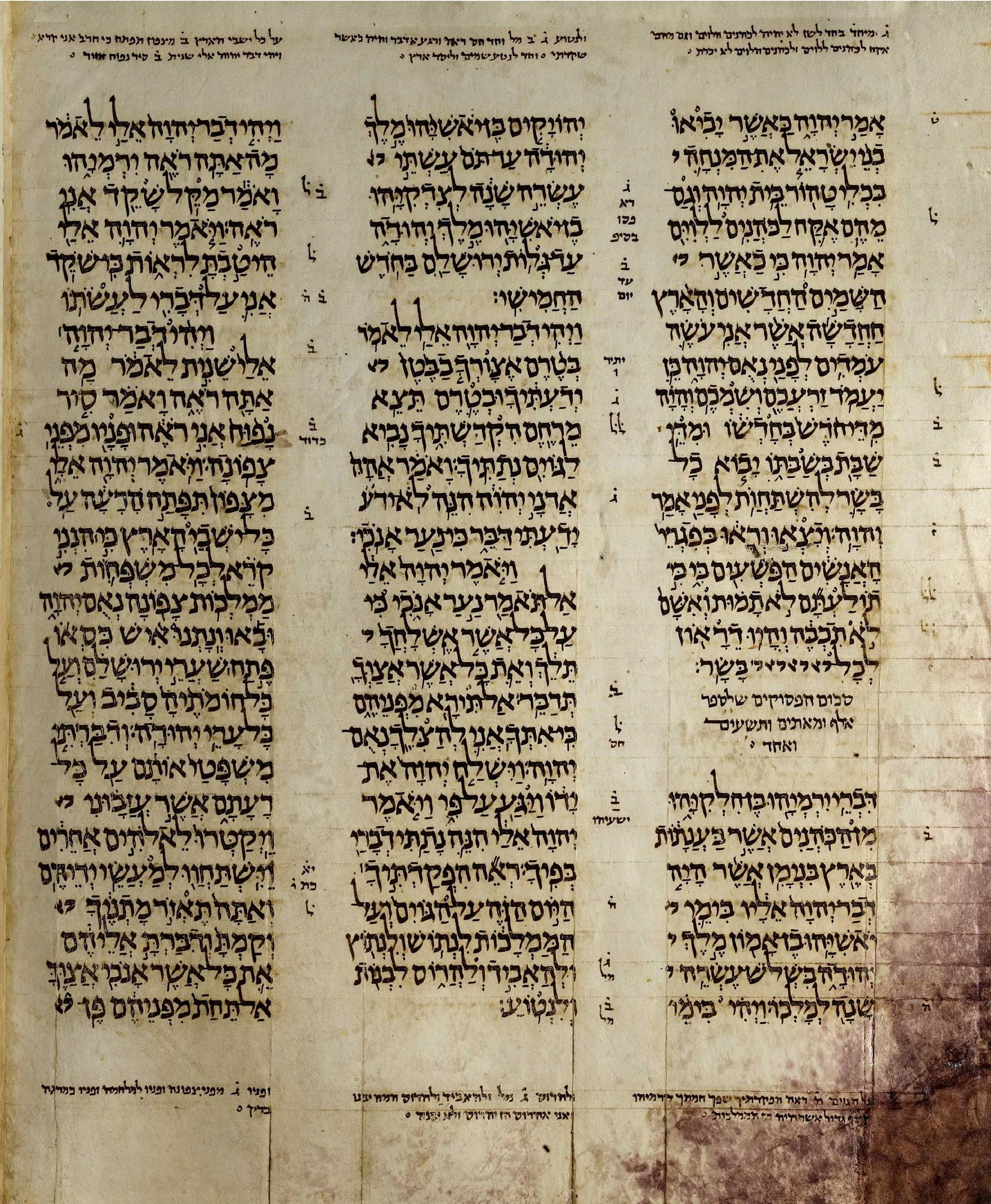
- A high resolution scan of the Aleppo Codex showing the Book of Jeremiah (the sixth book in Nevi'im).
- Book: Book of Jeremiah
- Hebrew Bible part: Nevi'im
- Order in the Hebrew part: 6
- Category: Latter Prophets
- Christian Bible part: Old Testament
- Order in the Christian part: 24

Jeremiah 37 is the thirty-seventh chapter of the Book of Jeremiah in the Hebrew Bible or the Old Testament of the Christian Bible. It is numbered as Jeremiah 44 in the Septuagint. This book contains prophecies attributed to the prophet Jeremiah, and is one of the Books of the Prophets. This chapter is the start of a narrative section consisting of chapters 37 to 44. Chapter 37 records King Zedekiah's request for prayer, Jeremiah's reply to the king, and Jeremiah's arrest and imprisonment.

== Text ==
The original text was written in Hebrew. This chapter is divided into 21 verses.

=== Textual witnesses ===
Some ancient manuscripts containing the text of this chapter in Hebrew are of the Masoretic Text tradition, which includes the Codex Cairensis (895), the Petersburg Codex of the Prophets (916), Aleppo Codex (10th century), Codex Leningradensis (1008).

There is also a translation into Koine Greek known as the Septuagint, made in the last few centuries BCE. Extant ancient manuscripts of the Septuagint version include Codex Vaticanus (B; $\mathfrak{G}$^{B}; 4th century), Codex Sinaiticus (S; BHK: $\mathfrak{G}$^{S}; 4th century), Codex Alexandrinus (A; $\mathfrak{G}$^{A}; 5th century) and Codex Marchalianus (Q; $\mathfrak{G}$^{Q}; 6th century).

== Parashot ==
The parashah sections listed here are based on the Aleppo Codex. Jeremiah 37 is a part of the "Fifteenth prophecy (Jeremiah 36-39)" in the section of Prophecies interwoven with narratives about the prophet's life (Jeremiah 26-45). {P}: open parashah; {S}: closed parashah.

{P} 37:1-5 {P} 37:6-8 {P} 37:9-11 {S} 37:12-21 [38:1-2 {S}]

== Verse numbering ==
The order of chapters and verses of the Book of Jeremiah in the English Bibles, Masoretic Text (Hebrew), and Vulgate (Latin), in some places differs from that in the Septuagint (LXX, the Greek Bible used in the Eastern Orthodox Church and others) according to Rahlfs or Brenton. The following table is taken with minor adjustments from Brenton's Septuagint, page 971.

The order of Computer Assisted Tools for Septuagint/Scriptural Study (CATSS) based on Alfred Rahlfs' Septuaginta (1935), differs in some details from Joseph Ziegler's critical edition (1957) in Göttingen LXX. Swete's Introduction mostly agrees with Rahlfs' edition (=CATSS).

Hebrew, Vulgate, English	Rahlfs' LXX (CATSS)
37:1-21	44:1-21
30:1-9,12-14,16-21,23-24	37:1-9,12-14.16-21,23-24
30:10,15,22	none

== Structure ==
The New King James Version divides this chapter into the following sections:

- Jeremiah 37:1–10 = Zedekiah's Vain Hope
- Jeremiah 37:11–21 = Jeremiah Imprisoned

== Zedekiah’s vain hope (37:1–10) ==
=== Verse 1 ===
Now King Zedekiah the son of Josiah reigned instead of Coniah the son of Jehoiakim, whom Nebuchadnezzar king of Babylon made king in the land of Judah.

- Cross reference: 2 Kings 24:8–9
- "Coniah": the spelling of Jeconiah found in Jeremiah 22:24, 28 and 37:1; elsewhere in the book of Jeremiah it is spelled as "Jeconiah" (Jeremiah 24:1; 27:20; 28:4; 29:2; cf. 1 Chronicles 3:16, 17; Esther 2:6) and "Jehoiachin" (Jeremiah 52:31, 33; cf. 2 Kings 24:6, 8, 12, 15; 25:27, 29; 2 Chronicles 36:8, 9; Ezekiel 1:2).

=== Verse 2 ===
But neither he nor his servants nor the people of the land listened to the words of the Lord that he spoke through Jeremiah the prophet.

Verses 37:1–2 introduce the accounts in chapters 37–38 that Zedekiah and his regime was as disobedient as Jehoiakim and his regime (Jeremiah 36:27; cf. 2 Kings 24:19-20), although Zedekiah was said to seek the Lord’s help or seek a word from the Lord, even sending to inquire of Jeremiah three times, but he did not pay attention to the warnings he received in reply, so was ultimately responsible for the fall of Jerusalem (Jeremiah 39).

=== Verse 3 ===
And Zedekiah the king sent Jehucal the son of Shelemiah, and Zephaniah the son of Maaseiah, the priest, to the prophet Jeremiah, saying, "Pray now to the Lord our God for us."

- "Jehucal the son of Shelemiah": or "Jucal the son of Shelemiah" in Jeremiah 38:1. During the excavations in the ruins of the City of David conducted by the Ir David Foundation in 2005 a bulla was discovered with the inscription "belonging to Jehucal son of Shelemiah (Shelemyahu) son of Shovi" which is thought to point to the person mentioned here.

=== Verse 5 ===
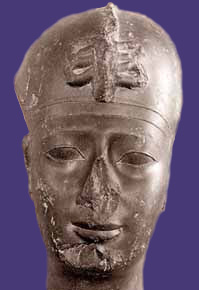
The head of "Apries" or "Pharaoh-Hophra", Louvre

Then Pharaoh’s army came up from Egypt; and when the Chaldeans who were besieging Jerusalem heard news of them, they departed from Jerusalem.

- "Pharaoh": is Hophra (or Apries), the fourth king (counting from Psamtik I) of the 26th dynasty of Egypt, ruling 589-570 BCE. His name is written as Ουαφρη[ς], Ouaphre[s] in the Greek Old Testament, Ancient Greek: Ἁπρίης Apries by Herodotus (ii. 161) and Diodorus (i. 68), or Waphres by Manetho, who correctly records that he reigned for 19 years. He forged an alliance with Zedekiah to rebel against Babylon (cf. Ezekiel 17:11–18), sending an army in the summer of 588 BCE. This caused the Chaldeans to temporarily lift the siege in Jerusalem to deal with the Egyptians, but eventually failed to prevent the fall of the city in July 587 BCE. In 570 BC Hophra was forced to rule together as co-regents with Amasis (or Ahmosis/Ahmose II), but three years later Hophra was overthrown and executed, while Amasis continued to be a sole ruler until his death in 526 BCE.

== Jeremiah imprisoned (37:11–21) ==
=== Verse 12 ===
Jeremiah went out of Jerusalem to go into the land of Benjamin to claim his property there among the people.

The meaning of the Hebrew in this verse is uncertain: the nineteenth-century biblical commentator Alexander Maclaren suggests that Jeremiah went with a group of Benjaminites, reading "in the midst of the people" with "to go into the land of Benjamin". He argues then that "the others seem to have been let pass, and only Jeremiah detained".

== See also ==
- Babylon
- Benjamin
- Chaldean
- Egypt
- Israel
- Irijah the son of Shelemiah, the son of Hananiah
- Jehoiakim
- Coniah the son of Jehoiakim
- Jehucal the son of Shelemiah
- Jeremiah
- Jerusalem
- Josiah
- Judah
- List of artifacts in biblical archaeology
- Pharaoh
- Nebuchadnezzar
- Zedekiah
- Zephaniah the son of Maaseiah
- Related Bible part: 2 Kings 19, 2 Kings 24, 2 Chronicles 36, Jeremiah 21, Jeremiah 29, Ezekiel 17

== Sources ==
- Huey, F. B. (1993). The New American Commentary - Jeremiah, Lamentations: An Exegetical and Theological Exposition of Holy Scripture, NIV Text. B&H Publishing Group. ISBN 9780805401165.
- Ryle, Herbert Edward (2009). The Cambridge Bible for Schools and Colleges Paperback. BiblioBazaar. ISBN 9781117708690.
- Thompson, J. A. (1980). A Book of Jeremiah. The New International Commentary on the Old Testament (illustrated, revised ed.). Wm. B. Eerdmans Publishing. ISBN 9780802825308.
- Würthwein, Ernst (1995). The Text of the Old Testament. Translated by Rhodes, Erroll F. Grand Rapids, MI: Wm. B. Eerdmans. ISBN 0-8028-0788-7.
