= Jeremiah 22 =

Book of Jeremiah, chapter 22

- ← chapter 21 chapter 23 →
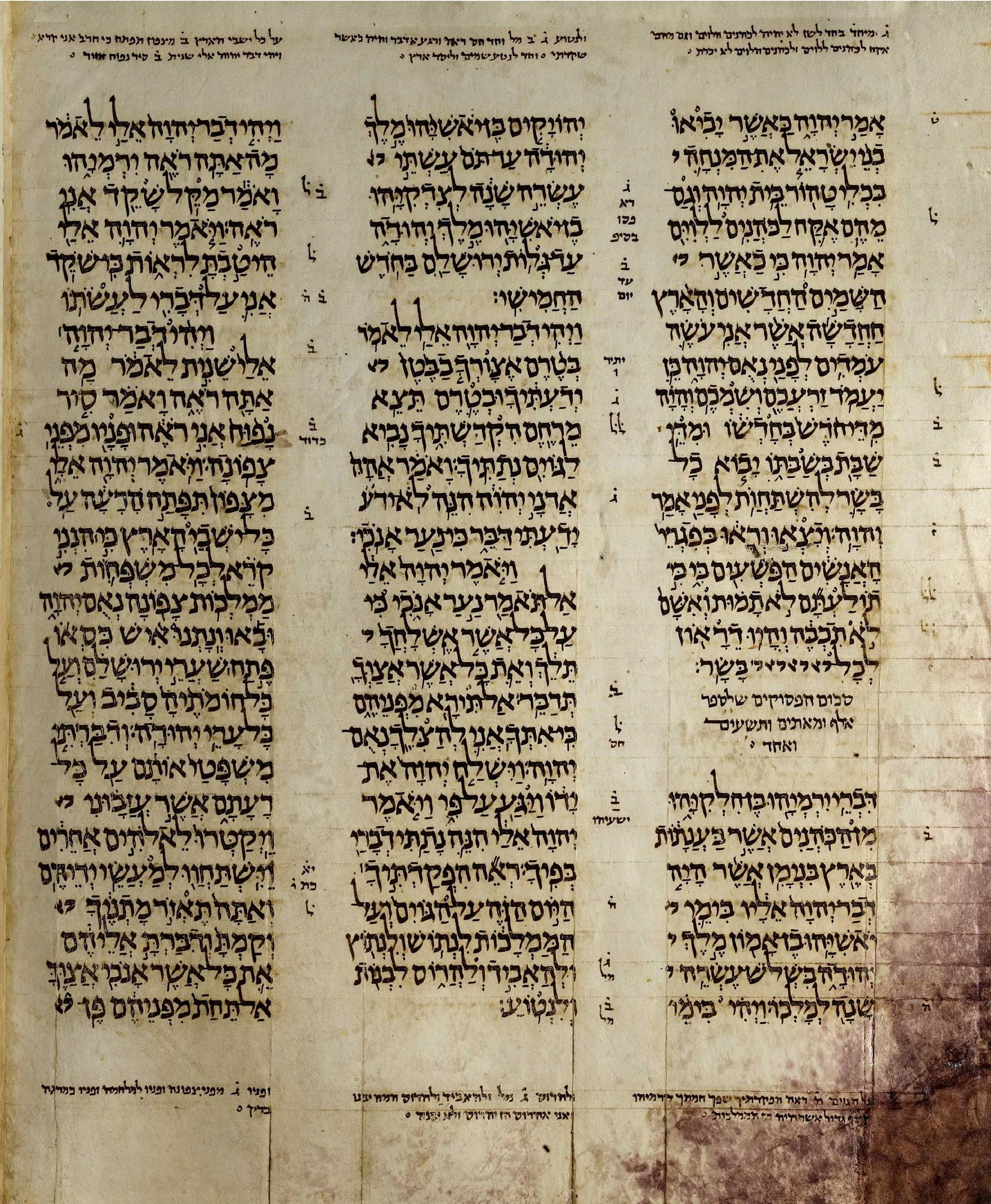
- A high resolution scan of the Aleppo Codex showing the Book of Jeremiah (the sixth book in Nevi'im).
- Book: Book of Jeremiah
- Hebrew Bible part: Nevi'im
- Order in the Hebrew part: 6
- Category: Latter Prophets
- Christian Bible part: Old Testament
- Order in the Christian part: 24

Jeremiah 22 is the twenty-second chapter of the Book of Jeremiah in the Hebrew Bible or the Old Testament of the Christian Bible. This book contains prophecies attributed to the prophet Jeremiah, and is one of the Books of the Prophets.

== Text ==
The original text of this chapter is written in the Hebrew language. This chapter is divided into 30 verses.

=== Textual witnesses ===
Some early manuscripts containing the text of this chapter in Hebrew are of the Masoretic Text tradition, which includes the Codex Cairensis (895), the Petersburg Codex of the Prophets (916), Aleppo Codex (10th century), Codex Leningradensis (1008). Fragments containing parts of this chapter were found among the Dead Sea Scrolls, i.e., 4QJer^{a} (4Q70; 225-175 BCE) with extant verses 3‑16, and 4QJer^{c} (4Q72; 1st century BC) with extant verses 4‑6, 10‑28, 30 (similar to Masoretic Text).

There is also a translation into Koine Greek known as the Septuagint, made in the last few centuries BCE. Extant ancient manuscripts of the Septuagint version include Codex Vaticanus (B; $\mathfrak{G}$^{B}; 4th century), Codex Sinaiticus (S; BHK: $\mathfrak{G}$^{S}; 4th century), Codex Alexandrinus (A; $\mathfrak{G}$^{A}; 5th century) and Codex Marchalianus (Q; $\mathfrak{G}$^{Q}; 6th century).

== Parashot ==
The parashah sections listed here are based on the Aleppo Codex. Jeremiah 22 is a part of the Eighth prophecy (Jeremiah 21-24) in the section of Prophecies of Destruction (Jeremiah 1-25). {P}: open parashah; {S}: closed parashah.

[{S} 21:11-14] 22:1-5 {P}22:6-9 {S} 22:10-12 {S} 22:13-17 {S} 22:18-19 {S} 22:20-27 {P} 22:28-30 {P}

== Structure ==
The New King James Version groups this chapter into:

- Jeremiah 22:1–10 = Prophecies Against the Kings of Judah (continuing from Jeremiah 21:11–14)
- Jeremiah 22:11–23 = Message to the Sons of Josiah
- Jeremiah 22:24–30 = Message to Coniah

== Prophecies against the kings of Judah (22:1–10) ==
=== Verse 1 ===
Thus says the Lord: "Go down to the house of the king of Judah, and there speak this word"

=== Verse 6 ===
Though you are like Gilead to me, like the summit of Lebanon, I will surely make you like a wasteland, like towns not inhabited.

The overthrow of the monarchy is foretold. Biblical commentator A. W. Streane suggests that verses 6–7, on the downfall of Jerusalem, are written "in Ḳinah metre".

== Message to the sons of Josiah (22:11–23) ==
=== Verse 11 ===
For thus says the Lord concerning Shallum the son of Josiah, king of Judah, who reigned instead of Josiah his father, who went from this place: "He shall not return here anymore"

- "Shallum the son of Josiah" was the fourth son of king Josiah (1 Chronicles 3:15), when he was anointed as king by the people of Judah to succeed Josiah (2 Kings 23:30; 2 Chronicles 36:1) in 609 BC, but dethroned after three months by Pharaoh Necho, imprisoned, taken captive to Egypt, and died without returning from there (2 Kings 23:31–34; 2 Chronicles 36:2-4; Ezekiel 19:4), fulfilling Jeremiah's prophecy in this chapter.

=== Verse 18 ===
Therefore thus says the Lord concerning Jehoiakim the son of Josiah, king of Judah:

"They shall not lament for him,

Saying, 'Alas, my brother!' or 'Alas, my sister!'

They shall not lament for him,

Saying, 'Alas, master!' or 'Alas, his glory!'"

- "Jehoiakim the son of Josiah": is the second son of king Josiah (1 Chronicles 3:15), also called Eliakim before he was made king of Judah by Pharaoh Necho to replace Jehoahaz (2 Kings 23:34; 2 Chronicles 36:4) in 609/608 BC, reigning eleven years, until 598 BCE. Rabbinical literature describes Jehoiakim as a godless tyrant who committed atrocious sins and crimes. He is portrayed as living in incestuous relations with his mother, daughter-in-law, and stepmother, and was in the habit of murdering men, whose wives he then violated and whose property he seized. He also had tattooed his body. Jeremiah criticised the king's policies, insisting on repentance and strict adherence to the law. Another prophet, Uriah ben Shemaiah, proclaimed a similar message and Jehoiakim ordered his execution (Jeremiah 26:20–23). His despicable character earned him no respect from the people, as in 598 BC to end the siege of Jerusalem, the priests of Sanhedrin delivered him to Nebuchadnezzar king of Babylon who "bound him in fetters, to carry him to Babylon." and he died without proper funeral, described by Jeremiah that "he shall be buried with the burial of a donkey, dragged and cast out beyond the gates of Jerusalem" (Jeremiah 22:19) "and his dead body shall be cast out to the heat of the day and the frost of the night" (Jeremiah 36:30).

=== Verse 19 ===
He shall be buried with the burial of a donkey,

Dragged and cast out beyond the gates of Jerusalem.

Josephus wrote that Nebuchadnezzar slew Jehoiakim along with high-ranking officers and then commanded Jehoiakim's body "to be thrown before the walls, without any burial."

== Message to Coniah (22:24–30) ==
=== Verse 24 ===
"As I live," says the Lord, "though Coniah the son of Jehoiakim, king of Judah, were the signet on My right hand, yet I would pluck you off"

- "Coniah": a spelling of the name Jeconiah, the son of Jehoiakim, who succeeded his father, Jehoiakim, for three months and ten days as the king of Judah (2 Kings 24:8; 2 Chronicles 36:9) in 597 BC, until he and his family members (including his mother as noted in Jeremiah 22:25; 2 Kings 24:15) as well as a number of officers were exiled to Babylon by Nebuchadnezzar, while the king of Babylon placed Zedekiah on the throne of Judah (Jeremiah 24:11–17; 2 Chronicles 36:9–10; Jeremiah 37:1). The spelling "Coniah" (Hebrew: כניהו is found only in Jeremiah 22:24,28 and Jeremiah 37:1, whereas the spelling Jeconiah (Hebrew: יכניהו in Jeremiah 24:1; or יכוניה in Jeremiah 27:20; 28:4; 29:2; Esther 2:6; 1 Chronicles 3:16) and Jehoiachin (Hebrew: יהויכין in 2 Kings 24:6, 2 Chronicles 36:8, Jeremiah 52:31, or יויכין in Ezekiel 1:2). For 36 years Jeconiah remained in prison at Babylon, and the archeological evidence of his presence in Babylon was found in form of rations tablets bearing his name and title. When Nebuchadnezzar died, his son Evil-merodach released Jeconiah and gave him an honorable seat at his own table (2 Kings 25:27–30; Jeremiah 52:31–34).

=== Verse 28 ===
"Is this man Coniah a despised, broken idol—

A vessel in which is no pleasure?

Why are they cast out, he and his descendants,

And cast into a land which they do not know?"

- "Coniah": a spelling of the name Jeconiah found in Jeremiah 22:24, 28 and Jeremiah 37:1.

=== Verse 30 ===
"Thus says the Lord:

Write this man down as childless,
A man who shall not prosper in his days;
For none of his descendants shall prosper,
Sitting on the throne of David,
And ruling anymore in Judah."

Jeconiah has seven sons according to 1 Chronicles 3:17–18, but the Davidic lineage of kingship did not extend to his heirs. This prophecy starts with the "threefold address" of "earth" (Hebrew: ארץ ’e-rets) in Jeremiah 22:29 (similar to the use with "holy" in Isaiah 6:3 and "overthrown" in Ezekiel 21:27) to place a strong emphasis that "no descendant of Jeconiah shall rule Judah."

== See also ==
- Babylon
- Bashan
- Abarim
- Chaldea
- Coniah
- David
- Gilead
- Jehoiakim
- Jeremiah
- Jerusalem
- Josiah
- Judah
- Lebanon
- Nebuchadnezzar
- Shallum
- Zedekiah
- Related Bible parts: 2 Kings 23, 2 Kings 24, 1 Chronicles 3, 2 Chronicles 36, Jeremiah 36, Ezekiel 19

== Bibliography ==
- Ulrich, Eugene, ed. (2010). The Biblical Qumran Scrolls: Transcriptions and Textual Variants. Brill.
- Würthwein, Ernst (1995). The Text of the Old Testament. Translated by Rhodes, Erroll F. Grand Rapids, MI: Wm. B. Eerdmans. ISBN 978-0-8028-0788-5.
