= Jeremiah 23 =

Book of Jeremiah, chapter 23

- ← chapter 22 chapter 24 →
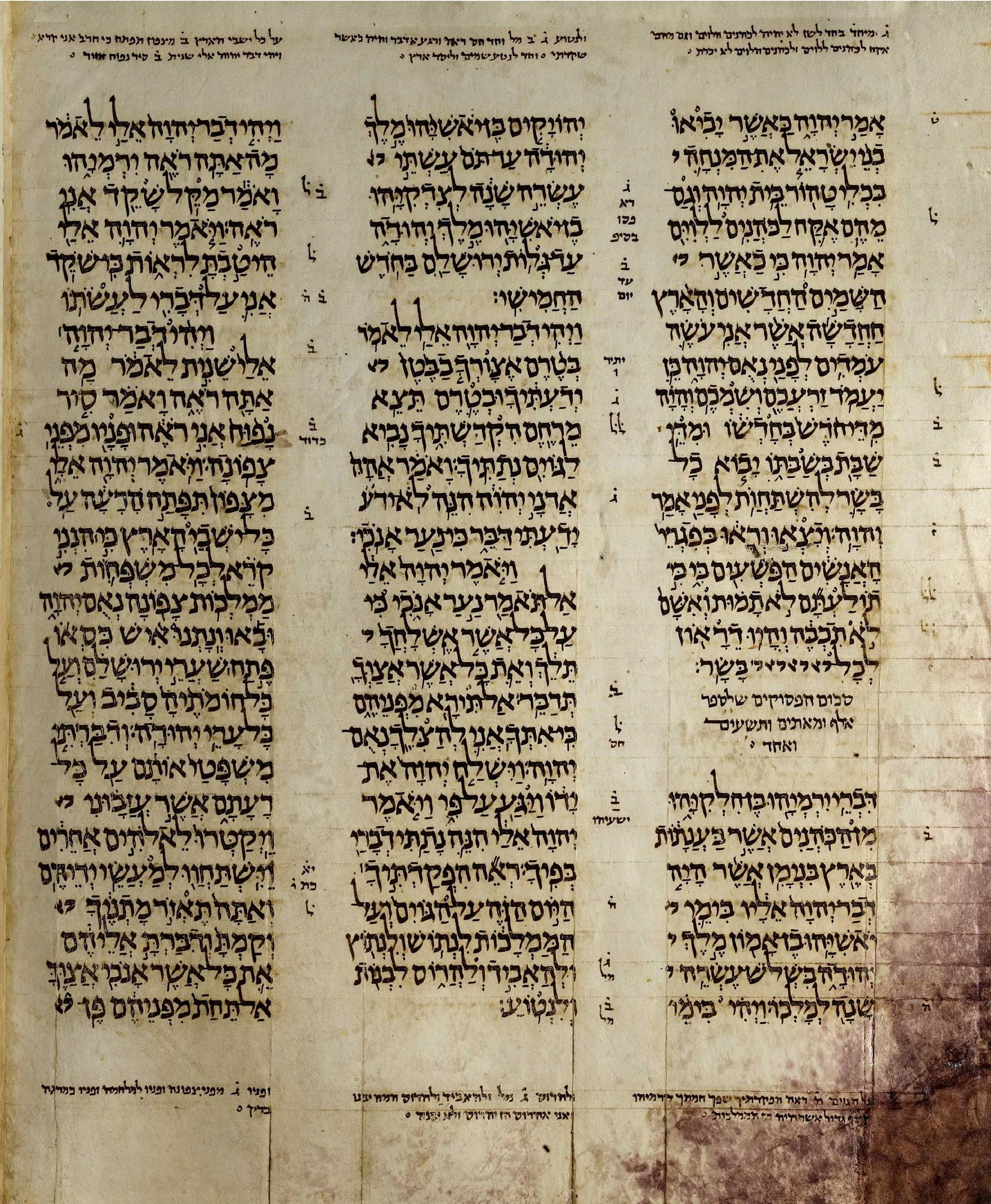
- A high resolution scan of the Aleppo Codex showing the Book of Jeremiah (the sixth book in Nevi'im).
- Book: Book of Jeremiah
- Hebrew Bible part: Nevi'im
- Order in the Hebrew part: 6
- Category: Latter Prophets
- Christian Bible part: Old Testament
- Order in the Christian part: 24

Jeremiah 23 is the twenty-third chapter of the Book of Jeremiah in the Hebrew Bible or the Old Testament of the Christian Bible. This book contains prophecies attributed to the prophet Jeremiah, and is one of the Books of the Prophets.

== Text ==
The original text of this chapter was written in the Hebrew language. This chapter is divided into 40 verses.

=== Textual witnesses ===
Some early manuscripts containing the text of this chapter in Hebrew are of the Masoretic Text tradition, which includes the Codex Cairensis (895), the Petersburg Codex of the Prophets (916), Aleppo Codex (10th century), Codex Leningradensis (1008).

There is also a translation into Koine Greek known as the Septuagint, made in the last few centuries BCE. Extant ancient manuscripts of the Septuagint version include Codex Vaticanus (B; $\mathfrak{G}$^{B}; 4th century), Codex Sinaiticus (S; BHK: $\mathfrak{G}$^{S}; 4th century), Codex Alexandrinus (A; $\mathfrak{G}$^{A}; 5th century) and Codex Marchalianus (Q; $\mathfrak{G}$^{Q}; 6th century).

== Parashot ==
The parashah sections listed here are based on the Aleppo Codex. Jeremiah 23 is a part of the Eighth prophecy (Jeremiah 21-24) in the section of Prophecies of Destruction (Jeremiah 1-25). {P}: open parashah; {S}: closed parashah.

{P} 23:1 {S} 23:2-4 {S} 23:5-6 {P} 23:7-8 {P} 23:9-14 {P} 23:15 {P} 23:16-22 {S} 23:23-29 {S} 23:30-40 {P}

== Structure ==
The section headings for this chapter in the New King James Version are:

- Jeremiah 23:1–8 = The Branch of Righteousness
- Jeremiah 23:9–40 = False Prophets and Empty Oracles.

The Jerusalem Bible describes verses 1–8 as a "messianic oracle", and verses 9-40 as "a tract against the false prophets".

== The Righteous Branch (23:1–8) ==
=== Verse 5 ===
"Behold, the days are coming," says the Lord,
"That I will raise to David a Branch of righteousness
A King shall reign and prosper,
And execute judgment and righteousness in the earth."

The ideal of a "great king reigning with justice and righteousness" was founded on the promise of God to King David:

Your house and your kingdom shall be established forever before you. Your throne shall be established forever.

"Branch" would later become a messianic title (cf. Zechariah 3:8 and 6:12). The New Century Version (aimed at younger readers) paraphrases the title as "a good branch in David’s family".

=== Verse 6 ===
"In His days Judah will be saved,
And Israel will dwell safely;
Now this is His name by which He will be called:

THE LORD OUR RIGHTEOUSNESS."

- "THE LORD OUR RIGHTEOUSNESS" (Hebrew: יהוה צדקנו, Yah-weh tsiḏ-qê-nū; cf. Jeremiah 33:16) a contrast to the name of Zedekiah, meaning "The Lord is My Righteousness" (Jeremiah 21:1), whose rule (597-586 BC) is "a great misnomer" compared to the "true, righteous rule" by God's appointed king (see also Isaiah 9:7; Isaiah 11:1–10).

== The lying prophets (23:9–40) ==
=== Verse 30 ===
"Therefore behold, I am against the prophets," says the Lord, "who steal My words every one from his neighbor."

- "Says the Lord": from Hebrew נאם־יהוה, nə-’um-YHWH, literally "oracle of the Lord".
- "My words": that is 'their own word that they claim is from the Lord' (cf. verse 31).

=== Verse 31 ===
"Behold, I am against the prophets," says the Lord, "who use their tongues and say, 'He says.'"

- "Says the Lord": from Hebrew "nə-’um-YHWH", "oracle of the Lord". (cf. verse 30).
- "He says": from Hebrew נאם, nə-’um, without the qualifying name "the Lord" to suggest the 'delusive nature' of the false prophets' message, that 'they mislead people into believing that their message is from the Lord'.

== See also ==
- Baal
- David
- Gomorrah
- Israel
- Jerusalem
- Sodom
- Judah
- Samaria
- Related Bible parts: 2 Samuel 7, Isaiah 4, Isaiah 9, Isaiah 11, Isaiah 53, Jeremiah 33, Ezekiel 34, Zechariah 3, Zechariah 6, Matthew 1, Luke 3, Philippians 3

== Sources ==
- Coogan, Michael David (2007). Coogan, Michael David; Brettler, Marc Zvi; Newsom, Carol Ann; Perkins, Pheme (eds.). The New Oxford Annotated Bible with the Apocryphal/Deuterocanonical Books: New Revised Standard Version, Issue 48 (Augmented 3rd ed.). Oxford University Press. ISBN 9780195288810.
- Würthwein, Ernst (1995). The Text of the Old Testament. Translated by Rhodes, Erroll F. Grand Rapids, MI: Wm. B. Eerdmans. ISBN 0-8028-0788-7.
