= 2 Chronicles 36 =

Second Book of Chronicles, chapter 36

- ← chapter 35 Ezra 1 →
- The complete Hebrew text of the Books of Chronicles (1st and 2nd Chronicles) in the Leningrad Codex (1008 CE).
- Book: Books of Chronicles
- Category: Ketuvim
- Christian Bible part: Old Testament
- Order in the Christian part: 14

2 Chronicles 36 is the thirty-sixth (and the final) chapter of the Second Book of Chronicles the Old Testament of the Christian Bible or of the second part of the Books of Chronicles in the Hebrew Bible. The book is compiled from older sources by an unknown person or group, designated by modern scholars as "the Chronicler", and had the final shape established in late fifth or fourth century BCE. This chapter belongs to the section focusing on the kingdom of Judah until its destruction by the Babylonians under Nebuchadnezzar and the beginning of restoration under Cyrus the Great of Persia (2 Chronicles 10 to 36). It contains the regnal accounts of the last four kings of Judah - Jehoahaz, Jehoiakim, Jehoiachin and Zedekiah - and the edict of Cyrus allowing the exiled Jews to return to Jerusalem.

== Text ==
This chapter was originally written in the Hebrew language and is divided into 23 verses.

=== Textual witnesses ===
Some early manuscripts containing the text of this chapter in Hebrew are of the Masoretic Text tradition, which includes the Aleppo Codex (10th century), and Codex Leningradensis (1008).

There is also a translation into Koine Greek known as the Septuagint, made in the last few centuries BCE. Extant ancient manuscripts of the Septuagint version include Codex Vaticanus (B; $\mathfrak{G}$^{B}; 4th century), and Codex Alexandrinus (A; $\mathfrak{G}$^{A}; 5th century). (Note: The whole book of 2 Chronicles is missing from the extant Codex Sinaiticus.) This chapter is also largely reproduced in chapter 1 of the Septuagint's 1 Esdras (verses 34-58).

=== Old Testament references ===
- 2 Chronicles 36:1–4: 2 Kings 23:31–35
- 2 Chronicles 36:5–8: 2 Kings 23:36–37
- 2 Chronicles 36:9–10: 2 Kings 24:6–9
- 2 Chronicles 36:11–14: 2 Kings 24:18–20; Jeremiah 52:1–3
- 2 Chronicles 36:15–21: 2 Kings 25:1–7
- 2 Chronicles 36:22–23: Ezra 1:1–4; Isaiah 45:1–25.

== Analysis ==
The final chapter contains shortened history of the four final kings of Judah (to less than half the length in the Books of Kings, although there is a small amount of additions). The omissions are on the details of Jerusalem's destruction (also the reference to Manasseh's sins, 2 Kings 24:3), the names of the queen mothers, part of the evaluations on the kings, and some death announcements (such as the death of kings in foreign lands), but giving a more united story than the Books of Kings. The additions refer to the temple, a strong theological argument of the people's responsibility for their downfall), the deportation of the survivors of Judah (verse 20) and the mention of the Persian successors to Babylon. In particular, verse 21 contains an interpretation (instead of a "description") of the exile ('until the land had made up for its sabbaths') and part of Cyrus's edict, which is more completely cited in the opening part of the book of Ezra, allowing the deported Jews to return to Jerusalem and rebuild the temple.

== Jehoahaz king of Judah (36:1–4) ==
The regnal account of Jehoahaz is brief and omits details of the journey to the land of Hamath as well as the concluding judgement (as with the account Abijah, the only other king to get this treatment). Mathys links this to the positive verdict in the Book of Jeremiah (Jeremiah 22:15–16).

=== Verse 1 ===
Then the people of the land took Jehoahaz the son of Josiah, and made him king in his father's stead in Jerusalem.

- "Jehoahaz": written as "Joahaz" in Masoretic Texts. It could be a throne name since Jeremiah 22:11 and 1 Chronicles 3:15 wrote his name as "Shallum".

=== Verse 2 ===
Jehoahaz was twenty and three years old when he began to reign, and he reigned three months in Jerusalem.

- Cross reference: 2 Kings 23:31
- "Twenty and three years old when he began to reign": Both William F. Albright and E. R. Thiele dated his reign to 609 BCE, making his birth in 633/632 BCE. The Babylonian Chronicles dates the battle in Harran with Assyrians and Egypt under Pharaoh Necho from Tammuz (July–August) to Elul (August–September) of 609 BCE, which would place the death of Josiah and the start of Jehoahaz reign in month of Tammuz 609 BCE or the month prior, when Egyptian army was still on the way to Harran.

=== Verse 3 ===
And the king of Egypt put him down at Jerusalem, and condemned the land in an hundred talents of silver and a talent of gold.

- "A hundred talents": about 3¾ tons, or 3.4 metric tons.
- "A talent": about 75 pounds, or 34 kilograms.

=== Verse 4 ===
And the king of Egypt made Eliakim his brother king over Judah and Jerusalem, and turned his name to Jehoiakim. And Necho took Jehoahaz his brother, and carried him to Egypt.

- Cross reference: 2 Kings 23:34
- "Turned his name": Probably Pharaoh Neco (also spelled "Necho" or "Nechoh" in different Bible versions) made the new king swear fealty "by Jehovah", then changed his name to be "Jehoiakim", to remind the people of the oath. Apparently the Pharaoh left the choice of the name to the person, so the change could be as small as possible, in this case, to substitute the initial element "El" (God) in "El-iakim" with "Jeho" (Hebrew: "Yahu" for YHWH) in "Jeho-iakim".
- "Jehoahaz": spelled as "Joahaz" in Masoretic Text.

== Jehoiakim king of Judah (36:5–8) ==
The regnal account of Jehoiakim is much reduced compared to the Book of Kings: omitting the attacks of the Chaldeans, Arameans, Moabites, and Ammonites (2 Kings 24:2) and adding the information about Nebuchadnezzar's attack in 597 BCE, placed Jehoiakim in fetters and intended to take him to Babylon, although it is unclear how far the journey was, since the Hebrew text allows multiple interpretations (verse 7). More attention is given to the fate of the temple and its equipment (cf. verses 10, 18–19) which links to Daniel 1:2.

=== Verse 5 ===
Jehoiakim was twenty and five years old when he began to reign, and he reigned eleven years in Jerusalem: and he did that which was evil in the sight of the Lord his God.

- "Jehoiakim": the throne name of Eliakim, the son of Josiah and the older brother of Jehoahaz.

== Jehoiachin king of Judah (36:9–10) ==
The regnal account of Jehoiachin focuses on the deportation of the king along with temple equipments (cf. verse 7). The Babylonian Chronicles record 2 Adar (16 March), 597 BCE, as the date that Nebuchadnezzar captured Jerusalem, putting an end to the reign of Jehoaichin and installing Zedekiah as king of Judah (verse 10).

=== Verse 9 ===
Jehoiachin was eight years old when he became king, and he reigned three months and ten days in Jerusalem. He did what was evil in the sight of the Lord.

- Cross reference: 2 Kings 24:8
- "Jehoiachin" the son of Jehoiakim. His existence was attested by tablets found near the Ishtar Gate of ancient Babylon (now in Iraq), such as the Jehoiachin's Rations Tablets, dated to c. 592 BCE, mentioning his name in cuneiform (Akkadian: 𒅀𒀪𒌑𒆠𒉡, "Ia-'-ú-kinu") and his five sons as recipients of food rations in Babylon. "Jehoiachin" is the throne name of Jeconiah as written in Jeremiah 24:1; 28:4; 29:2, which has the abbreviated form "Coniah" in Jeremiah 22:24, 28; 37:1.

based on Septuagint and Syriac manuscripts (compare to 2 Kings 24:8), but most Hebrew manuscripts have "eight".

- "Three months and ten days": according Thiele's chronology, Jehoiachin became "co-regent" with his father, Jehoiakim, in September 608 BCE when he was 8 years old, then became the sole ruler at the age of 18 from 21 Marcheshvan to 10 Nisan (9 December 598 BCE to 22 April 597 BCE). The precise date of Jehoiachin's reign can be reconstructed from extra-biblical documents such as Babylonian Chronicles that Nebuchadnezzar, king of Babylon, took Jerusalem on 15/16 March 597 BCE. Jehoiachin was deported to Babylon on 22 April 597 BCE, so the start of his reign of 3 months and 10 days can be calculated to be on 9 December 598 BCE, right after the death of Jehoiakim, whose corpse would be exposed to the frost of (winter) night (Jeremiah 36:30).

=== Verse 10 ===
And when the year was expired, king Nebuchadnezzar sent, and brought him to Babylon, with the goodly vessels of the house of the Lord, and made Zedekiah his brother king over Judah and Jerusalem.

- "His brother": refers to Jehoiakim.

The Nebuchadnezzar Chronicle attested the replacement of the king of Judah as follows:

In the seventh year, the month of Kislîmu, the king of Akkad... besieged the city of Judah and on the second day of the month of Addaru he seized the city and captured the king. He appointed there a king of his own choice, received its heavy tribute and sent to Babylon.

== Zedekiah king of Judah (36:11–16) ==
The regnal account of Zedekiah is similarly short as those of the previous three kings, even for the account of 'the pillage of the cultic vessels' (verse 18 compared to 2 Kings 25:13-17), because the emphasis is on the sin of the people and their kings (the Exile is seen as the result of Manasseh's sin), that Zedekiah 'did what was evil in the sight of the LORD, just as Jehoiakim had done' (2 Kings 24:19). In addition, Zedekiah was also disobedient towards the prophet Jeremiah and did not want to repent.

=== Verse 11 ===
Zedekiah was twenty-one years old when he began to reign, and he reigned eleven years in Jerusalem.

- "Zedekiah": was the throne name of "Mattaniah", the younger brother of Jehoahaz from the same father and mother (cf. 2 Kings 23:31) and the uncle of Jehoiachin.

== The fall of Jerusalem (36:17–21) ==
The climax of temple plundering: 'All the vessels of the house of God' in verse 18 is followed by the taking away of the king's and princes' private treasures (verse 19) with very little words about Jerusalem's actual destruction and nothing about vineyard and field workers who were left behind on the land. Instead, it directly relates the end of exile when the kingdom of Persia ruled over Babylon. The sentence in verse 21 combines Jeremiah's prophecy of 70 years of exile (Jeremiah 25:11–12) with the warning in Leviticus 26 regarding the consequences of abusing the sabbath years.

=== Verse 20 ===
And those who escaped from the sword he carried away to Babylon, where they became servants to him and his sons until the rule of the kingdom of Persia,

- "Until the rule of the kingdom of Persia": from this, it may be concluded that the books of Chronicles were written after the return of the exiles from captivity.

=== Verse 21 ===
to fulfill the word of the Lord by the mouth of Jeremiah, until the land had enjoyed her Sabbaths. As long as she lay desolate she kept Sabbath, to fulfill seventy years.

- "By the mouth of Jeremiah": See Jeremiah 25:12 and Jeremiah 29:10.

== The edict of Cyrus (36:22–23) ==
The last section of the chapter (and the whole books of Chronicles) relates Cyrus's edict, allowing the exiled Jews to return to their land and to rebuild the temple. The text could be based on Ezra 1:1–3, but it was left as an open ending, with the appeal, 'Let him go up', which may serve as a link to the Books of Ezra and Nehemiah or as a general reference to the future.

=== Verse 22 ===
Now in the first year of Cyrus king of Persia, that the word of the Lord spoken by the mouth of Jeremiah might be accomplished, the Lord stirred up the spirit of Cyrus king of Persia, that he made a proclamation throughout all his kingdom, and put it also in writing, saying,

- Cross reference: Ezra 1:1
- "Cyrus king of Persia": (c. 600 – 530 BC), commonly known as "Cyrus the Great"; his name and title as the "king of Persia" are written in the Nabonidus Chronicle. He "put in writing" a declaration in Akkadian cuneiform script on a clay cylinder, now known as the "Cyrus Cylinder", which was used as a foundation deposit following the Persian conquest of Babylon in 539 BC, when the Neo-Babylonian Empire was invaded by Cyrus and incorporated into his Persian Empire. The words recorded in Ezra 1:2–4 are thought to represent the oral form of the edict, whereas the written form is recorded in Ezra 6.

=== Verse 23 ===
Thus says Cyrus king of Persia:

All the kingdoms of the earth the Lord God of heaven has given me. And He has commanded me to build Him a house at Jerusalem which is in Judah. Who is among you of all His people? May the Lord his God be with him, and let him go up!

- Cross reference: Ezra 1:2–3
- "House": here means "temple".
- "And let him go up": translated from the Hebrew word וְיָֽעַל, wə-yā-‘al, from the verb "alah", meaning "to go up, ascend, climb".

In the Cyrus Cylinder there is a statement related to the Cyrus's edict which gives the historical background to the book of Ezra:

I returned the images of the gods, who had resided there [i.e., in Babylon], to their places and I let them dwell in eternal abodes. I gathered all their inhabitants and returned to them their dwellings.

Cyrus's edict is significant to the return of the Jews, because it shows that they did not slip away from Babylon but were given official permission by the Persian king in the first year of his rule, and it is a specific fulfillment of the seventy years prophecy of Jeremiah (Jeremiah 25:11–14; Jeremiah 29:10–14).

== See also ==
- Battle of Carchemish
- Nebuchadnezzar Chronicle
- Related Bible parts: 2 Kings 23, 2 Kings 24, 2 Kings 25, Ezra 1, Jeremiah 25, Jeremiah 29, Jeremiah 52, Ezekiel 1

== Sources ==
- Ackroyd, Peter R (1993). "Chronicles, Books of". In Metzger, Bruce M; Coogan, Michael D (eds.). The Oxford Companion to the Bible. Oxford University Press. pp. 113–116. ISBN 978-0195046458.
- Bennett, William (2018). The Expositor's Bible: The Books of Chronicles. Litres. ISBN 978-5040825196.
- Coogan, Michael David (2007). Coogan, Michael David; Brettler, Marc Zvi; Newsom, Carol Ann; Perkins, Pheme (eds.). The New Oxford Annotated Bible with the Apocryphal/Deuterocanonical Books: New Revised Standard Version, Issue 48 (Augmented 3rd ed.). Oxford University Press. ISBN 9780195288810.
- Dandamaev, M. A. (1989). A political history of the Achaemenid empire. Leiden: Brill. ISBN 90-04-09172-6.
- Dietrich, Walter (2007). "13. 1 and 2 Kings". In Barton, John; Muddiman, John (eds.). The Oxford Bible Commentary (first (paperback) ed.). Oxford University Press. pp. 232–615. ISBN 978-0199277186.
- Grabbe, Lester L. (2003). "Ezra". In Dunn, James D. G.; Rogerson, John William (eds.). Eerdmans Commentary on the Bible (illustrated ed.). Wm. B. Eerdmans Publishing. pp. 313–319. ISBN 978-0802837110.
- Hallo, W.H.; Younger, K.L., eds. (2003). The Context of Scripture: Monumental Inscriptions from the Biblical World. Translated by Cogan, Mordechai. Leiden: Brill. ISBN 978-90-04-10619-2.
- Japhet, Sara (2007). "49. 1 Esdras". In Barton, John; Muddiman, John (eds.). The Oxford Bible Commentary (first (paperback) ed.). Oxford University Press. pp. 751–770. ISBN 978-0199277186.
- Mathys, H. P. (2007). "14. 1 and 2 Chronicles". In Barton, John; Muddiman, John (eds.). The Oxford Bible Commentary (first (paperback) ed.). Oxford University Press. pp. 267–308. ISBN 978-0199277186.
- McConville, J. G. (1985). Ezra, Nehemiah, and Esther. The daily study Bible : Old Testament. Westminster John Knox Press. ISBN 978-0664245832.
- McFall, Leslie (1991), "Translation Guide to the Chronological Data in Kings and Chronicles" (PDF), Bibliotheca Sacra, 148: 3–45, archived from the original (PDF) on August 27, 2010
- Nelson, Thomas (2014). NIV, Chronological Study Bible, EBook: Holy Bible, New International Version. Brazil: Thomas Nelson. ISBN 9781401680138.
- Sweeney, Marvin (2007). I & II Kings: A Commentary. Westminster John Knox Press. ISBN 978-0-664-22084-6.
- Thiele, Edwin R. (1983). The Mysterious Numbers of the Hebrew Kings (3rd ed.). Grand Rapids, Michigan: Zondervan. ISBN 978-0-310-36010-0.
- Schaudig, Hanspeter (2001). Die Inschriften Nabonids von Babylon und Kyros' des Großen, samt den in ihrem Umfeld entstandenen Tendenzschriften. Textausgabe und Grammatik (in German). Münster: Ugarit-Verlag.
- Smith-Christopher, Daniel L. (2007). "15. Ezra-Nehemiah". In Barton, John; Muddiman, John (eds.). The Oxford Bible Commentary (first (paperback) ed.). Oxford University Press. pp. 308–324. ISBN 978-0199277186.
- Ulrich, Eugene, ed. (2010). The Biblical Qumran Scrolls: Transcriptions and Textual Variants. Brill.
- Würthwein, Ernst (1995). The Text of the Old Testament. Translated by Rhodes, Erroll F. Grand Rapids, MI: Wm. B. Eerdmans. ISBN 0-8028-0788-7.
