= 1 Chronicles 3 =

First Book of Chronicles, chapter 3

- ← chapter 2 chapter 4 →
- The complete Hebrew text of the Books of Chronicles (1 and 2 Chronicles) in the Leningrad Codex (1008 CE).
- Book: Books of Chronicles
- Category: Ketuvim
- Christian Bible part: Old Testament
- Order in the Christian part: 13

1 Chronicles 3 is the third chapter of the Books of Chronicles in the Hebrew Bible or the First Book of Chronicles in the Old Testament of the Christian Bible. The book is compiled from older sources by an unknown person or group, designated by modern scholars as "the Chronicler", and had the final shape established in late fifth or 4th century BCE. This chapter contains the genealogy of unbroken Davidic line from the time of David to the post-exilic period, providing a possibility of the reinstatement of the Davidic monarchy in Jerusalem with its rightful heir, should circumstances allow. It is divided into three parts: (1) the sons of David (born in Hebron, verses 1–4; born in Jerusalem, verses 5–9); (2) the kings in Jerusalem (apart from the usurper Queen Athaliah, verses 10–16); (3) the descendants during and after the exile period, verses 17–24. Together with chapters 2 and 4, it focuses on the descendants of Judah: chapter 2 deals with the tribes of Judah in general, chapter 3 lists the sons of David in particular and chapter 4 concerns the remaining families in the tribe of Judah and the tribe of Simeon. These chapters belong to the section focusing on the list of genealogies from Adam to the lists of the people returning from exile in Babylon (1 Chronicles 1:1 to 9:34).

== Text ==
This chapter was originally written in the Hebrew language. It is divided into 24 verses.

=== Textual witnesses ===
Some early manuscripts containing the text of this chapter in Hebrew are of the Masoretic Text tradition, which includes the Aleppo Codex (10th century), and Codex Leningradensis (1008).

There is also a translation into Koine Greek known as the Septuagint, made in the last few centuries BCE. Extant ancient manuscripts of the Septuagint version include Codex Vaticanus (B; $\mathfrak{G}$^{B}; 4th century) and Codex Alexandrinus (A; $\mathfrak{G}$^{A}; 5th century). (Note: The extant Codex Sinaiticus only contains 1 Chronicles 9:27–19:17.)

=== Old Testament references ===
- 1 Chronicles 3:1–4: 2 Samuel 3:2–5
- 1 Chronicles 3:5–8: 2 Samuel 5:14–16; 1 Chronicles 14:4–7
- 1 Chronicles 3:10–16: 1 and 2 Kings

== Structure ==
The whole chapter belongs to an arrangement comprising 1 Chronicles 2:3–8:40 with the king-producing tribes of Judah (David; 2:3–4:43) and Benjamin (Saul; 8:1–40) bracketing the series of lists as the priestly tribe of Levi (6:1–81) anchors the center, in the following order:

A David's royal tribe of Judah (2:3–4:43)

B Northern tribes east of Jordan (5:1–26)

X The priestly tribe of Levi (6:1–81)

B' Northern tribes west of Jordan (7:1–40)

A' Saul's royal tribe of Benjamin (8:1–40)

Another concentric arrangement focuses on David's royal tribe of Judah (2:3–4:23), centering on the family of Hezron, Judah's grandson, through his three sons: Jerahmeel, Ram, and Chelubai (Caleb), as follows:

A Descendants of Judah: Er, Onan, and Shelah (2:3–8)

B Descendants of Ram up to David (2:9–17)

C Descendants of Caleb (2:18–24)

D Descendants of Jerahmeel (2:25–33)
D' Descendants of Jerahmeel (2:34–41)

C' Descendants of Caleb (2:42–55)

B' Descendants of Ram following David [David's descendants] (3:1–24)

A' Descendants of Shelah, Judah s only surviving son (4:21–23)

== Sons born to David in Hebron (3:1–4) ==
The house of David is the main focus within the large genealogy of Judah. This section shares almost word for word materials with 2 Samuel 3:2–5.

=== Verse 1 ===
Now these were the sons of David, which were born unto him in Hebron; the firstborn Amnon, of Ahinoam the Jezreelitess; the second Daniel, of Abigail the Carmelitess:

- "The second, Daniel": called "Chileab" (כלאב ke-le-ab, meaning "like to father") in 2 Samuel 3:3. A text of Septuaginta of 2 Samuel 3:3 reads "Dalouia". The Targum states, "The second, Daniel, who was also called Chileab, because he was in every respect like to his father." Jarchi says the two names were given to this person because David had taken Abigail immediately after the death of Nabal, so it could not be ascertained whether this child were the son of David or of Nabal, therefore David called him "Daniel" (דניאל, meaning "God ('El') is my Judge", which is, that he is David's son) and "Chileab" ("he who is like to the father") due to the striking resemblance to David.

=== Verse 4 ===
These six were born unto him in Hebron; and there he reigned seven years and six months: and in Jerusalem he reigned thirty and three years.

Verse 4 apparently is a rework of 2 Samuel 5:5. The move from Hebron to Jerusalem is not explained, assuming the readers' knowledge of the narratives in the earlier materials.

== Sons born to David in Jerusalem (3:5–9) ==
This section shares the same materials as 2 Samuel 5:14-16 (also in 1 Chronicles 14:4–7), and verse 9 from 2 Samuel 5:13; 13:1.

=== Verse 5 ===
And these were born unto him in Jerusalem; Shimea, and Shobab, and Nathan, and Solomon, four, of Bathshua the daughter of Ammiel:

- "Bath-shua, the daughter of Ammiel": called "Bathsheba the daughter of Eliam the wife of Uriah the Hittite" in 2 Samuel 11:3. Nothing is said about the adultery with David, nor about Uriah's murder. Four children are listed from her, whereas 2 Samuel only mentions Solomon and the older son, who was conceived in adultery and died young as David's punishment (2 Samuel 12:13–14).

== Davidic royal line (3:10–16) ==
The kings of Judah are listed here from Solomon up to the period of exile, following a monotonous formula—"his son was X"—until Josiah, who had several sons succeeding him, so that the Chronicler changes the listing method. The sources could be 2 Kings 22–24 and Book of Jeremiah (which uses Shallum, the alternative name of Joahaz, in Jeremiah 22:11). Parts of the list are repeated in 1 Chronicles 14:4–7, whereas in other parts some kings have different names from the rest of Chronicles (for examples, Azariah instead of Uzziah), and Zerubbabel's father is called Pedaiah, and not Shealtiel, as in Ezra 3:2, 8.

=== Verse 15 ===
And the sons of Josiah were, the firstborn Johanan, the second Jehoiakim, the third Zedekiah, the fourth Shallum.

- "Shallum": as also called with this name in Jeremiah 22:11, took the throne name "Jehoahaz" (2 Kings 23:29–30; 2 Chronicles 36:1) and ruled for 3 months before being deported by Pharaoh Necho to Egypt. In his place, the pharaoh installed his older brother, Jehoiakim (2 Kings 23:31–35; Jeremiah 22:10–12).

=== Verse 16 ===
And the sons of Jehoiakim: Jeconiah his son, Zedekiah his son.

Two sons of Jehoiakim are listed here: "Jeconiah" (also called "Jehoiachin" in 2 Kings 24:6–17; 2 Chronicles 36:8–9, and "Coniah" in Jeremiah 22:24) and "Zedekiah", which confirmed in 2 Chronicles 36:10 as the brother of Jeconiah. 2 Kings 24:17 states that king Zedekiah (the last king of Judah who replaced Jeconiah) was Jeconiah's uncle. Jeremiah consistently called Jehoiakim the son of Josiah and never called Zedekiah as the son of Josiah, leading to the assumption that Zedekiah in the book of Jeremiah refers to the brother of Jeconiah.

== Post-exilic descendants of David (3:17–24) ==
This section lists the descendants of David – in particular, the posterity of Jeconiah – during the exile and into the early part of post-exilic period. Jeconiah was taken away to Babylon in 597 BCE and among his seven sons, Shenazzar (called Shenazzar in Ezra 1:8–11; both names are the transliteration of Babylon name: "Sin-ab-uṣur"), became the first Persian-period governor of Judah.

=== Verse 17 ===
And the sons of Jeconiah; Assir, Salathiel his son,

- "Assir" (Hebrew: אסר ’as-sir): means "captive", "bondman", or "prisoner"; it does not appear to be a person's name here, but to signify that Jeconiah was a captive when he had his son, Salathiel (cf. Matthew 1:12). This interpretation 'accords with the Masoretic punctuation, which connects the term "assir" with Jeconiah', not to be rendered as "Jeconiah the captive" (which would require the definite article not found in the original), but rather as "Jeconiah when in captivity" or "as a captive."
- "Salathiel" (from Greek form in Septuagint Ancient Greek: Σαλαθιήλ; also in Matthew 1:12): transliterated from Hebrew: Hebrew: שְׁאַלְתִּיאֵ֖ל šə-’al-tî-’êl, "Shealti-el" (meaning "request of God"), written in Haggai 1:12, 14; 2:2 as Hebrew: שַׁלְתִּיאֵ֡ל "Shalti-el".

== See also ==
- Chronology of the Bible
- Davidic line
- Kings of Israel and Judah
- Kings of Judah
- Tree of Jesse
- Related Bible parts: 2 Samuel 5, 1 Kings 1, 2 Kings 25, 2 Chronicles 36, Ezra 1, Matthew 1, Luke 3

== Sources ==
- Ackroyd, Peter R (1993). "Chronicles, Books of". In Metzger, Bruce M; Coogan, Michael D (eds.). The Oxford Companion to the Bible. Oxford University Press. pp. 113–116. ISBN 978-0195046458.
- Bennett, William (2018). The Expositor's Bible: The Books of Chronicles. Litres. ISBN 978-5040825196.
- Coogan, Michael David (2007). Coogan, Michael David; Brettler, Marc Zvi; Newsom, Carol Ann; Perkins, Pheme (eds.). The New Oxford Annotated Bible with the Apocryphal/Deuterocanonical Books: New Revised Standard Version, Issue 48 (Augmented 3rd ed.). Oxford University Press. ISBN 9780195288810.
- Endres, John C. (2012). First and Second Chronicles. Liturgical Press. ISBN 9780814628447.
- Gilbert, Henry L (1897). "The Forms of the Names in 1 Chronicles 1-7 Compared with Those in Parallel Passages of the Old Testament". The American Journal of Semitic Languages and Literatures. 13 (4). Liturgical Press: 279–298. doi:10.1086/369250. JSTOR 527992.
- Hill, Andrew E. (2003). First and Second Chronicles. Zondervan. ISBN 9780310206101.
- Mabie, Frederick (2017). "I. The Chronicler's Genealogical Survey of All Israel". In Longman III, Tremper; Garland, David E (eds.). 1 and 2 Chronicles. The Expositor's Bible Commentary. Zondervan. pp. 267–308. ISBN 978-0310531814.
- Mathys, H. P. (2007). "14. 1 and 2 Chronicles". In Barton, John; Muddiman, John (eds.). The Oxford Bible Commentary (first (paperback) ed.). Oxford University Press. pp. 267–308. ISBN 978-0199277186.
- Tuell, Steven S. (2012). First and Second Chronicles. Westminster John Knox Press. ISBN 978-0664238650.
- Throntveit, Mark A. (2003). "Was the Chronicler a Spin Doctor? David in the Books of Chronicles". Word & World. 23 (4): 374–381.
- Ulrich, Eugene, ed. (2010). The Biblical Qumran Scrolls: Transcriptions and Textual Variants. Brill.
- Würthwein, Ernst (1995). The Text of the Old Testament. Translated by Rhodes, Erroll F. Grand Rapids, MI: William B. Eerdmans. ISBN 0-8028-0788-7.
