= Second Jewish Revolt =

The Second Jewish Revolt can refer to the following:

- A phase of the Jewish–Roman wars
  - the Diaspora Revolt
  - the Bar Kokhba revolt
- The 587 BCE phase of the Jewish–Babylonian war
