= City of David =

City of David may refer to:

- Bethlehem, called in Luke 2:4, 2–11 "the city of David" due to David being born there
- Jerusalem
  - City of David (archaeological site), the original settlement core of Jerusalem during the Bronze and Iron Ages
  - Wadi Hilweh, a neighborhood in the Palestinian Arab village of Silwan intertwined with an Israeli settlement called the City of David

== See also ==
- Ir David Foundation, or City of David Foundation
