= Jeremiah 38 =

Book of Jeremiah, chapter 38

- ← chapter 37 chapter 39 →
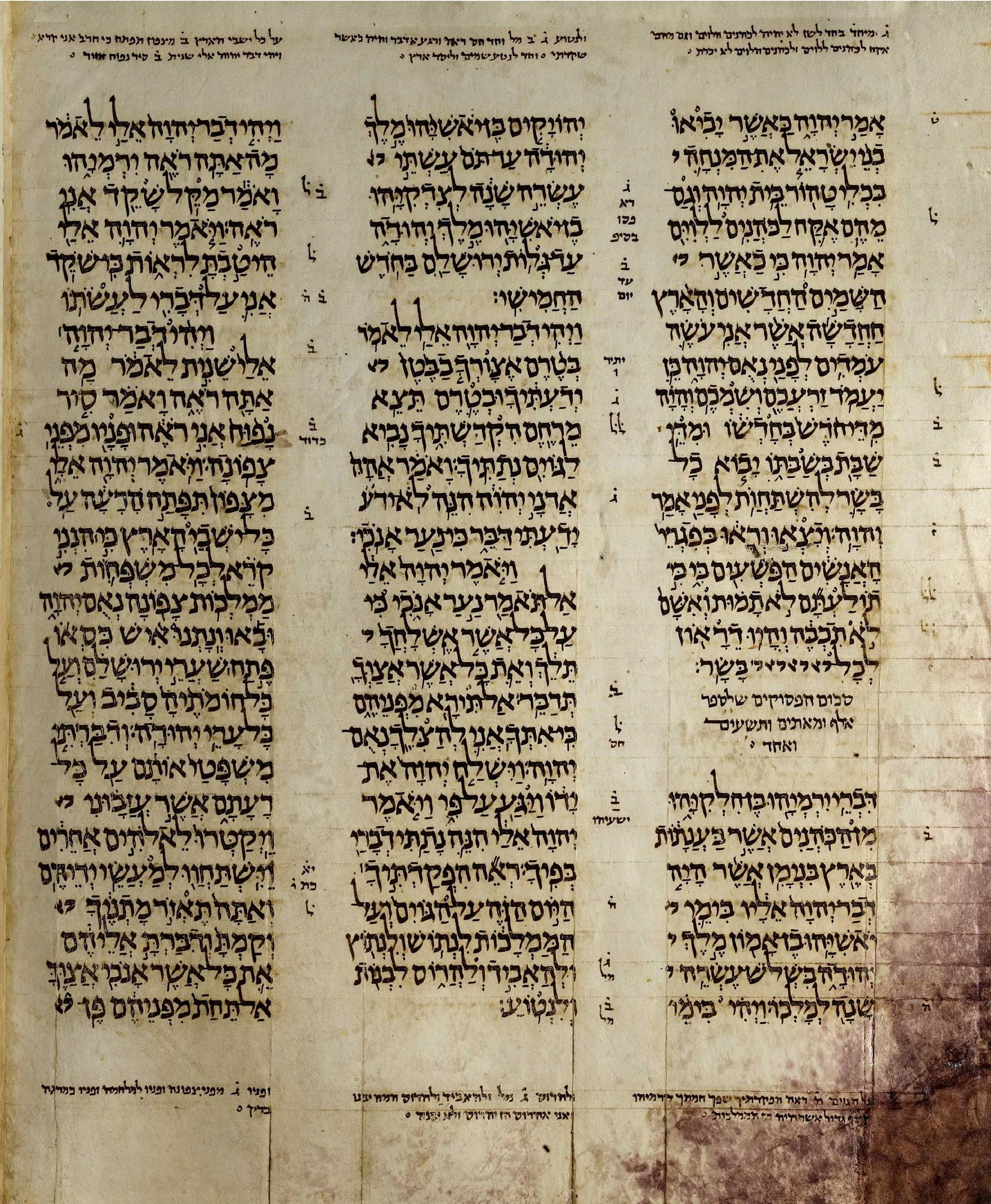
- A high resolution scan of the Aleppo Codex showing the Book of Jeremiah (the sixth book in Nevi'im).
- Book: Book of Jeremiah
- Hebrew Bible part: Nevi'im
- Order in the Hebrew part: 6
- Category: Latter Prophets
- Christian Bible part: Old Testament
- Order in the Christian part: 24

Jeremiah 38 is the thirty-eighth chapter of the Book of Jeremiah in the Hebrew Bible or the Old Testament of the Christian Bible. It is numbered as Jeremiah 45 in the Septuagint. This book contains prophecies attributed to the prophet Jeremiah, and is one of the Books of the Prophets. This chapter is part of a narrative section consisting of chapters 37 to 44. Chapter 38 records the petition from the royal officials to punish Jeremiah (verses 1–6), his confinement in the dungeon or cistern and his rescue from there (verses 7-13a), although he remains in captivity (verse 13b), a secret conversation between Jeremiah and King Zedekiah (verses 14–26), and the inquiry of Jeremiah by the king's officials (verses 27–28).

== Text ==
The original text was written in Hebrew. This chapter is divided into 28 verses.

=== Textual witnesses ===
Some early manuscripts containing the text of this chapter in Hebrew are of the Masoretic Text tradition, which includes the Codex Cairensis (895), the Petersburg Codex of the Prophets (916), Aleppo Codex (10th century), Codex Leningradensis (1008).

There is also a translation into Koine Greek known as the Septuagint, made in the last few centuries BCE. Extant ancient manuscripts of the Septuagint version include Codex Vaticanus (B; $\mathfrak{G}$^{B}; 4th century), Codex Sinaiticus (S; BHK: $\mathfrak{G}$^{S}; 4th century), Codex Alexandrinus (A; $\mathfrak{G}$^{A}; 5th century) and Codex Marchalianus (Q; $\mathfrak{G}$^{Q}; 6th century).

=== Verse numbering ===
The order of chapters and verses of the Book of Jeremiah in the English Bibles, Masoretic Text (Hebrew), and Vulgate (Latin), in some places differs from that in the Septuagint (LXX, the Greek Bible used in the Eastern Orthodox Church and others) according to Rahlfs or Brenton. The following table is taken with minor adjustments from Brenton's Septuagint, page 971.

The order of Computer Assisted Tools for Septuagint/Scriptural Study (CATSS) based on Rahlfs' Septuaginta (1935), differs in some details from Joseph Ziegler's critical edition (1957) in Göttingen LXX. Swete's Introduction mostly agrees with Rahlfs' edition (=CATSS).

Hebrew, Vulgate, English	Rahlfs' LXX (CATSS)	Brenton's LXX
38:1-28	45:1-28	
31:1-40	38:1-34,36,37,35,38-40	38:1-40

== Parashot ==
The parashah sections listed here are based on the Aleppo Codex. Jeremiah 38 is a part of the "Fifteenth prophecy (Jeremiah 36-39)" in the section of Prophecies interwoven with narratives about the prophet's life (Jeremiah 26-45). {P}: open parashah; {S}: closed parashah.

[{S} 37:12-21] 38:1-2 {S} 38:3-6 {S} 38:7-13 {S} 38:14-16 {S} 38:17a {S} 38:17b-18 כה אמר {S} 38:19-23 {S} 38:24-26 {P} 38:27-28a {S} 38:28b [39:1-14 והיה כאשר {S}]

== Structure ==
The New King James Version divides this chapter into the following sections:

- Jeremiah 38:1–13 = Jeremiah in the Dungeon
- Jeremiah 38:14–28 = Zedekiah's Fears and Jeremiah's Advice

== Verse 1 ==
Now Shephatiah the son of Mattan, Gedaliah the son of Pashhur, Jucal the son of Shelemiah, and Pashhur the son of Malchiah heard the words that Jeremiah had spoken to all the people, saying

- "Jucal the son of Shelemiah": same as "Jehucal the son of Shelemiah" in Jeremiah 37:3. During the excavations in the ruins of the City of David conducted by the Ir David Foundation in 2005 a bulla was discovered with the inscription "belonging to Jehucal son of Shelemiah (Shelemyahu) son of Shovi" which is thought to point to the person mentioned here.
- "Gedaliah the son of Pashhur": A bulla seal bearing the same name in Paleo-Hebrew alphabet was discovered by Eilat Mazar of Hebrew University, Jerusalem, during an excavation in the ruins of the City of David conducted by the Ir David Foundation in 2008, in the same strata, just a few yards away, from the seal of Jehucal the son of Shelemiah.
- "Pashhur, the son of Malchiah" is also named in Jeremiah 21:1.

== Verse 2 ==
"Thus says the Lord: 'He who remains in this city shall die by the sword, by famine, and by pestilence; but he who goes over to the Chaldeans shall live; his life shall be as a prize to him, and he shall live.'"

- Huey and others note the close similarities of the wording in this verse with Jeremiah 21:9, but concluded that the warning could have been repeated many times.

== Verse 4 ==
Therefore the princes said to the king, 'Please, let this man be put to death, for thus he weakens the hands of the men of war who remain in this city, and the hands of all the people, by speaking such words to them. For this man does not seek the welfare of this people, but their harm."

- According to the New Oxford Annotated Bible, the phraseology in this verse is found to be similar to one in "a letter written 18 months earlier, found in the excavations at Lachish" (Ostracon VI of Lachish letters).

== Verse 6 ==
So they took Jeremiah and cast him into the dungeon of Malchiah, the king’s son, which was in the court of the prison, and they let Jeremiah down with ropes. And in the dungeon there was no water, but mire. So Jeremiah sank in the mire.

This location is referred to as "the dungeon" in the King James Version and New King James Version, the American Standard Version and the Geneva Bible. It is referred to as "a cistern" in the English Standard Version, the revised edition of the New American Bible, the New International Version and the Revised Standard Version. The Jerusalem Bible describes it as a cistern or a well. Alternative readings state that Malchiah was not the king's son but "the son of Hammelech".

== Verses 7-13 ==
The story of Jeremiah's rescue from the cistern/dungeon is recalled in these verses. Ebed-melech, an Ethiopian royal servant, appears "inexplicably and with no prior narrative intimations", to become the one who call's for Jeremiah's rescue.

== Verse 28 ==
Now Jeremiah remained in the court of the prison until the day that Jerusalem was taken. And he was there when Jerusalem was taken.

The Jerusalem Bible merges the last part of this verse with Jeremiah 39:3: Now when Jerusalem was captured ... all the officers of the King of Babylon marched in...

== See also ==
- Babylon
- Chaldean
- Ebed-Melech
- Ethiopia
- Gedaliah the son of Pashhur
- Jucal the son of Shelemiah
- Jerusalem
- Judah
- List of artifacts in biblical archaeology
- Pashhur the son of Malchiah
- Shephatiah the son of Mattan
- Zedekiah
- Related Bible part: 2 Kings 24, Jeremiah 21, Jeremiah 36, Jeremiah 37, Jeremiah 39

== Sources ==
- Coogan, Michael David (2007). Coogan, Michael David; Brettler, Marc Zvi; Newsom, Carol Ann; Perkins, Pheme (eds.). The New Oxford Annotated Bible with the Apocryphal/Deuterocanonical Books: New Revised Standard Version, Issue 48 (Augmented 3rd ed.). Oxford University Press. ISBN 9780195288810.
- Huey, F. B. (1993). The New American Commentary - Jeremiah, Lamentations: An Exegetical and Theological Exposition of Holy Scripture, NIV Text. B&H Publishing Group. ISBN 9780805401165.
- Ryle, Herbert Edward (2009). The Cambridge Bible for Schools and Colleges Paperback. BiblioBazaar. ISBN 9781117708690.
- Würthwein, Ernst (1995). The Text of the Old Testament. Translated by Rhodes, Erroll F. Grand Rapids, MI: Wm. B. Eerdmans. ISBN 0-8028-0788-7.
