= Gedaliah, son of Pashhur =

Biblical figure

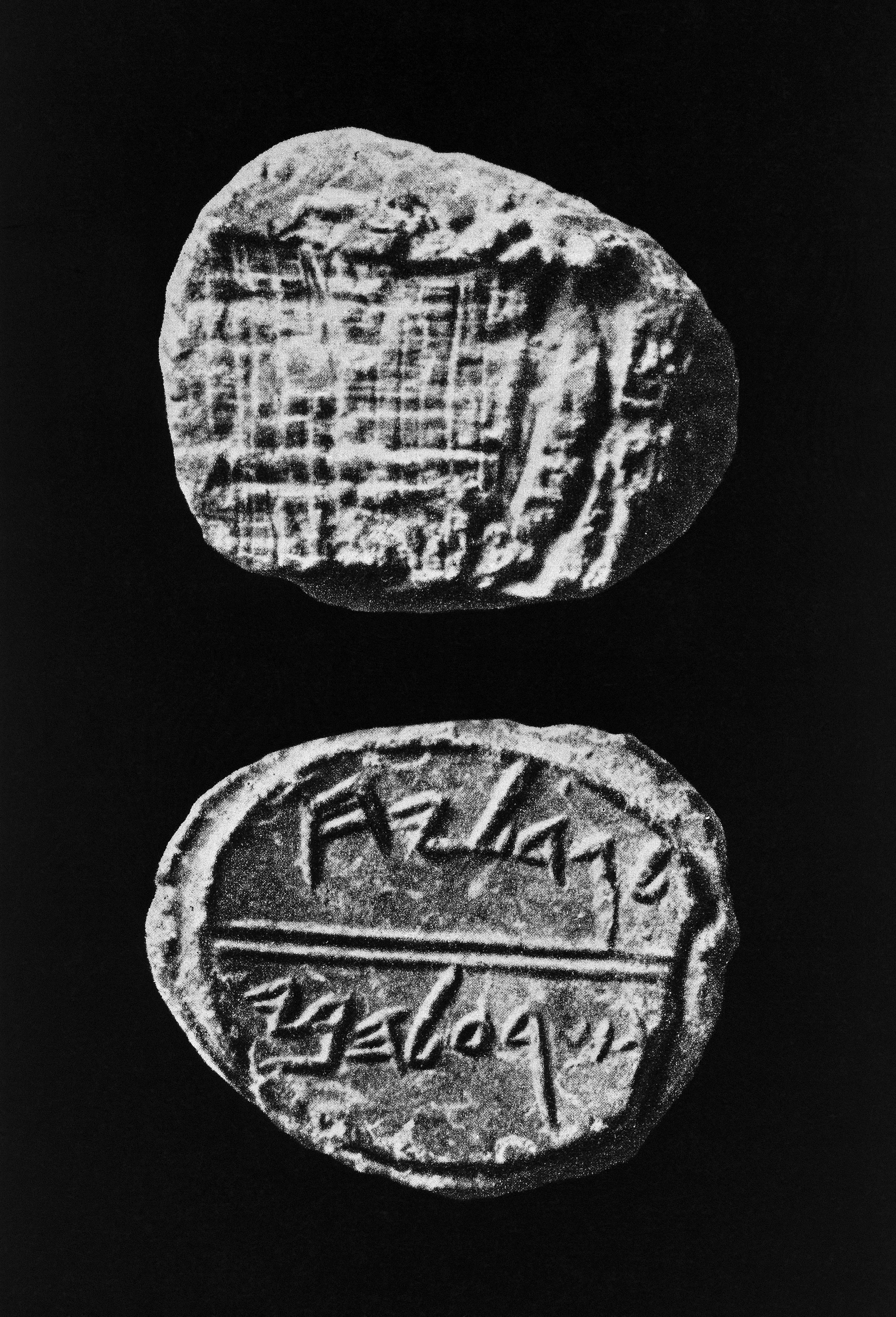
Recovered seal impression of Gedaliah

"On the one hand it is so unexpected to find such a fragile bulla in such harsh conditions of excavation, while on the other hand it was logical to find precisely here the bulla of Gedalyahu ben Pashur—only meters away from the place where we found the bulla of Yehukhal ben Shelemyahu—since these two ministers are mentioned side by side in the Bible as having served together in the kingdom of King Zedekiah," Mazar said.

— Jerusalem Post, 2008

Gedaliah, son of Pashhur appears in the Book of Jeremiah of the Hebrew Bible, Judaism's Tanakh, and Christianity's Old Testament. He is described as one of the political opponents of Jeremiah, one of those who appealed to King Zedekiah to have Jeremiah executed because of his prophecies that Jerusalem and the Temple would be destroyed by the Babylonians due to the wickedness of the Jews:

1 And Shephatiah the son of Mattan, and Gedaliah the son of Pashhur, and Jucal the son of Shelemiah, and Pashhur the son of Malchiah, heard the words that Jeremiah spoke unto all the people, saying: 2 Thus saith the LORD: He that remaineth in this city shall die by the sword, by the famine, and by the pestilence; but he that goeth forth to the Chaldeans shall live, and his life shall be unto him for a prey, and he shall live. 3 Thus saith the LORD: This city shall surely be given into the hand of the army of the king of Babylon, and he shall take it.' 4 Then the princes said unto the king: 'Let this man, we pray thee, be put to death; forasmuch as he weakeneth the hands of the men of war that remain in this city, and the hands of all the people, in speaking such words unto them; for this man seeketh not the welfare of this people, but the hurt.' (Jeremiah 38:1–4, Jewish Publication Society translation of 1917).

In August 2008, the Israeli archeologist Eilat Mazar announced the discovery of a bulla, a lump of clay bearing a seal impression, inscribed with the name Gedaliah ben Pashur, in the excavations of the Ir David Foundation in the City of David, just south of Jerusalem's Temple Mount. Written in the paleo-Hebrew alphabet, it is part of a larger group of artifacts known as Canaanite and Aramaic seal inscriptions. Mazar noted that the just-discovered bulla was found just yards from the spot where, three years ago, another bulla was found with a name from the above verse, viz. Yehukal ben Shelemyahu (Jucal, son of Shelemiah). Both men served as ministers to King Zedekiah, the last ruler of the Kingdom of Judah before Jerusalem and its Temple were destroyed by the Babylonians in 587 B.C.

== See also ==
- King Ahaz's seal
- List of inscriptions in biblical archaeology
