= Ebed-Melech =

Ethiopian official at the palace of king Zedekiah of Judah

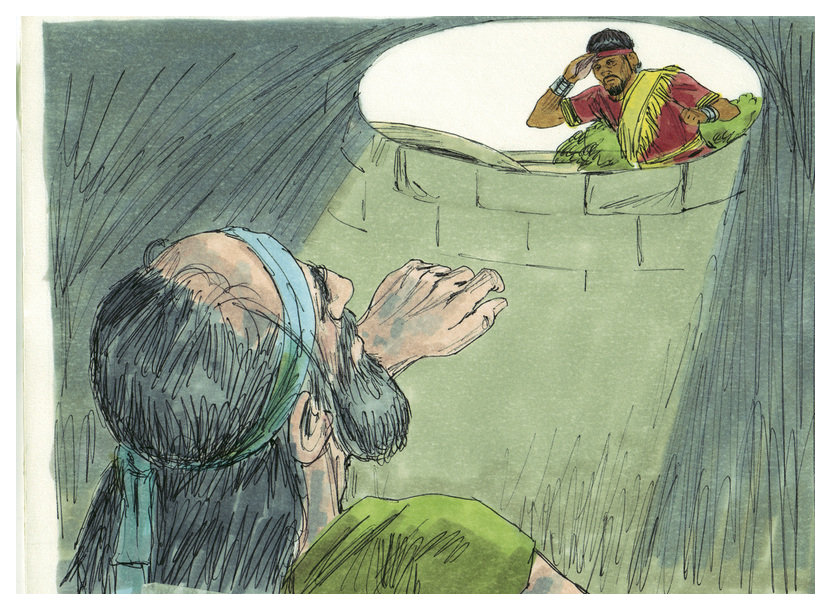
Ebed-Melech sees Jeremiah in the cistern. (Jim Padgett, 1984)

Ebed-Melech (Hebrew: עֶבֶד-מֶלֶךְ ‘Eḇeḏmeleḵ; Latin: Abdemelech; Ge'ez: አቤሜሌክ) is a character who appears in Jeremiah 38 and 39. When Jeremiah had been thrown into a cistern and left to die, Ebed-Melech came to rescue him. As a result, Jeremiah relayed God's message to him that he would survive the coming destruction of Jerusalem.

The name Ebed-Melech combines the Hebrew words servant and king, but scholars disagree on whether this combination is intended to be a title or personal name. He served in the palace of Zedekiah, King of Judah during the Siege of Jerusalem (597 BCE). The text states that he was a Cushite. According to Emmanuel Tov, the story exists in Hebrew and Greek versions that differ in length. The most important difference is that the LXX text, which Tov considers the original, does not call Ebed-Melech a eunuch.

Many draw parallels between the story of Ebed-Melech and that of another Ethiopian eunuch in Acts 8:26-40.

== See also ==
- Entering heaven alive
- Proselyte
- Baruch ben Neriah
