= Jeremiah 20 =

Book of Jeremiah, chapter 20

- ← chapter 19 chapter 21 →
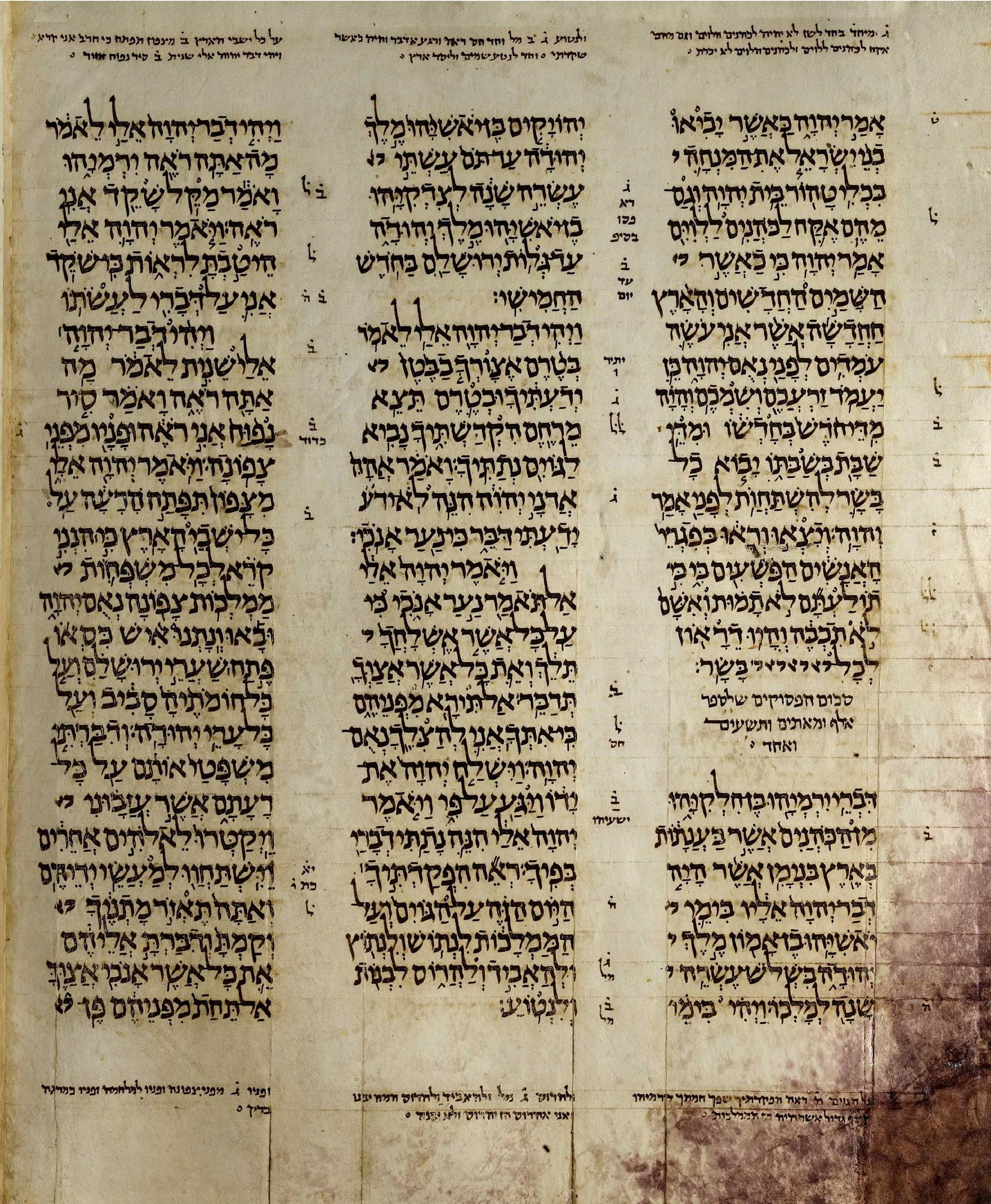
- A high-resolution scan of the Aleppo Codex showing the Book of Jeremiah (the sixth book in Nevi'im)
- Book: Book of Jeremiah
- Hebrew Bible part: Nevi'im
- Order in the Hebrew part: 6
- Category: Latter Prophets
- Christian Bible part: Old Testament
- Order in the Christian part: 24

Jeremiah 20 is the twentieth chapter of the Book of Jeremiah in the Hebrew Bible or the Old Testament of the Christian Bible. This book contains prophecies attributed to the prophet Jeremiah, and is one of the Books of the Prophets. The later part of this chapter, from verse 7, includes the fifth of the passages known as the "Confessions of Jeremiah".

== Text ==
The original text was written in the Hebrew language. This chapter is divided into 18 verses.

=== Textual witnesses ===
Some early manuscripts containing the text of this chapter in Hebrew are of the Masoretic Text tradition, which includes the Codex Cairensis (895), the Petersburg Codex of the Prophets (916), Aleppo Codex (10th century), Codex Leningradensis (1008). Some fragments containing parts of this chapter were found among the Dead Sea Scrolls, i.e., 4QJer^{a} (4Q70; 225-175 BCE) with extant verses 14‑18, and 4QJer^{c} (4Q72; 1st century BC) with extant verses 2‑9, 13‑15 (similar to Masoretic Text).

There is also a translation into Koine Greek known as the Septuagint, made in the last few centuries BCE. Extant ancient manuscripts of the Septuagint version include Codex Vaticanus (B; $\mathfrak{G}$^{B}; 4th century), Codex Sinaiticus (S; BHK: $\mathfrak{G}$^{S}; 4th century), Codex Alexandrinus (A; $\mathfrak{G}$^{A}; 5th century) and Codex Marchalianus (Q; $\mathfrak{G}$^{Q}; 6th century).

== Parashot ==
The parashah sections listed here are based on the Aleppo Codex. Jeremiah 20 is a part of the Seventh prophecy (Jeremiah 18-20) in the section of Prophecies of Destruction (Jeremiah 1-25). {P}: open parashah; {S}: closed parashah.

[{S} 19:15] 20:1-3 {S} 20:4-6 {P} 20:7-12 {S} 20:13 {S} 20:14-18

== Altercation with Pashhur (verses 1–6) ==
=== Verse 1 ===
Now Pashur the son of Immer the priest, who was also chief governor in the house of the Lord, heard that Jeremiah prophesied these things.

- "Pashhur, the son of Immer", leader of the "Temple police", publicly struck Jeremiah (verse 2; KJV: "smote"), earning a prophecy of doom with the new name "magor-misabib" (Jeremiah 20:3). Pottery shards with the name Pashhur written on it were unearthed at Tel Arad in the 1970s, and this so-called "Tel Arad Ostraca" may refer to the same individual mentioned in this verse.
- "Chief governor" (from Hebrew: פקיד נגיד, pā-qîḏ nā-ḡîḏ): or "deputy governor", that is, a person overseeing "the temple, temple guards, entry into the court and so on" and must be a priest. The nagid, or "governor", of the temple was the high priest (1 Chronicles 9:11), the office held at that time by Seraiah the high priest, the grandson of Hilkiah (1 Chronicles 6:14; or possibly still his father, Azariah, Hilkiah's son and Jeremiah's brother, 1 Chronicles 6:13; Ezra 7:1), and Pashhur was his paqid (or pakid; "deputy"; cf. Jeremiah 1:10: God appointed Jeremiah, "set thee over" - literally, "have made thee Paqid"). Zephaniah held the office of paqid in Jeremiah 29:26, and his relation to the high priest is exactly defined (2 Kings 25:18; Jeremiah 52:24).

=== Verse 2 ===
Then Pashur smote Jeremiah the prophet, and put him in the stocks that were in the high gate of Benjamin, which was by the house of the Lord.

The Jerusalem Bible treats Jeremiah's altercation with Passhur as part of the narrative of the broken jug in chapter 19.

=== Verse 3 ===
And it came to pass on the morrow, that Pashur brought forth Jeremiah out of the stocks. Then said Jeremiah unto him, The Lord hath not called thy name Pashur, but Magormissabib.

- "Magormisabib": transliterated from Hebrew: מגור מסביב (mā-ḡōr mi-sā-ḇîḇ; "terror on every side" or "fear on every side"; in this verse; Jeremiah 6:25; Psalm 31:13), is a new name given to Pashhur, the son of Immer, after he struck Jeremiah the prophet, as prophecy that Pashhur would share the fate of Jerusalem's inhabitants who were taken into the exile (Jeremiah 20:6, Jeremiah 25:8–11).

== Jeremiah's unpopular ministry (verses 7–18) ==
This is the fifth and final section of the Confessions of Jeremiah.

=== Verse 7 ===
You seduced me, LORD, and I let myself be seduced; you were too strong for me, and you prevailed. All day long I am an object of laughter; everyone mocks me.

The prophet "accuses God of attracting him like a man who attracts a woman and then dominates her"; many other translations refer to Jeremiah being "deceived" rather than "seduced".

== See also ==
- Babylon
- Benjamin
- Jeremiah
- Jerusalem
- Judah
- Pashhur
- Related Bible parts: Deuteronomy 25, Job 3, Psalm 31, Jeremiah 6

== Sources ==
- Coogan, Michael David (2007). Coogan, Michael David; Brettler, Marc Zvi; Newsom, Carol Ann; Perkins, Pheme (eds.). The New Oxford Annotated Bible with the Apocryphal/Deuterocanonical Books: New Revised Standard Version, Issue 48 (Augmented 3rd ed.). Oxford University Press. ISBN 9780195288810.
- The Nelson Study Bible. Thomas Nelson, Inc. 1997. ISBN 9780840715999.
- Ulrich, Eugene, ed. (2010). The Biblical Qumran Scrolls: Transcriptions and Textual Variants. Brill.
- Würthwein, Ernst (1995). The Text of the Old Testament. Translated by Rhodes, Erroll F. Grand Rapids, MI: Wm. B. Eerdmans. ISBN 978-0-8028-0788-5.
