= Pashhur =

Characters in the Book of Jeremiah

Pashur or Pashhur (Hebrew: פשחור, romanized: Pašḥur) was the name of at least two priests contemporary with the prophet Jeremiah and who are mentioned in the Book of Jeremiah. The name is of Egyptian origin, Pš-Ḥr.

== Pashur ben Immer ==
Pashhur the son of Immer (possibly the same as Amariah, Nehemiah 10:3; 12:2), was deputy chief priest (paqid nagid) of the temple (Jeremiah 20:1, 2). (At this time, the nagid "governor" of the temple would have been Seraiah - 1 Chronicles 6:14). Enraged at the plainness with which Jeremiah uttered his solemn warnings of coming judgements because of the abounding iniquity of the times, "Pashhur thereupon had Jeremiah flogged and put in the cell at the Upper Benjamin Gate in the House of GOD." in Jeremiah 20:2. Upon being set free in the morning, Jeremiah went to Pashhur and announced, "GOD has named you not Pashhur, but Magor-missabib," i.e., "terror on every side", and that he would be later carried captive to Babylon and die there (Jeremiah 20:6).

== Pashur ben Malchiah ==
Pashhur, the son of Malchiah, was another priest who was sent by King Zedekiah to Jeremiah to inquire of the Lord regarding the impending attack of Nebuchadnezzar II of the Neo-Babylonian Empire in Jeremiah 21:1. In Jeremiah 38:1–6, Pashhur was also one of four men who advised Zedekiah to put Jeremiah to death for his prophecies of doom but who ended up throwing him into a cistern.

== Gedaliah ben Pashur ==
Pashhur, the father of Gedaliah in Jeremiah 38:1 is possibly the same Pashhur. Gedaliah was another of the four men who threw Jeremiah into the cistern.

== Historicity ==
The pottery shards of the Tel Arad ostraca unearthed in the 1970s written in Paleo-Hebrew mention a Pashhur.
