= Jehucal =

Biblical figure

Jehucal or Jucal (Hebrew יְהוּכַל Yəhūḵal) is a Hebrew name referring to a particular person in the Hebrew Bible. Using the biblical source Jeremiah 37:3 he would have lived around the late 7th century to early 6th century BC. The name was also found in Tell Es-Safi and in one of the Arad letters.

== Biblical accounts ==
Jehucal is only mentioned in chapters 37 and 38 of the Book of Jeremiah:

Jeremiah 37:3

And Zedekiah the king sent Jehucal the son of Shelemiah, and Zephaniah the son of Maaseiah the priest, to the prophet Jeremiah, saying: 'Pray now unto the LORD our God for us'

Jeremiah 38:1

Now Shephatiah the son of Mattan, Gedaliah the son of Pashhur, Jucal the son of Shelemiah, and Pashhur the son of Malchiah heard the words that Jeremiah had spoken to all the people, saying

== Archeology ==
Excavations conducted by the Ir David Foundation in the City of David uncovered a bulla (clay seal) bearing his name in 2005. It read yhwkl bn šlmyhw bn šby: Yehukal son of Shelemyahu son of Shebi. Written in the paleo-Hebrew alphabet, it is part of a larger group of artifacts known as Canaanite and Aramaic seal inscriptions.
