= 2 Kings 24 =

Chapter of the Hebrew Bible and Old Testament

- ← chapter 23 chapter 25 →
- The pages containing the Books of Kings (1 & 2 Kings) Leningrad Codex (1008 CE).
- Book: Second Book of Kings
- Hebrew Bible part: Nevi'im
- Order in the Hebrew part: 4
- Category: Former Prophets
- Christian Bible part: Old Testament
- Order in the Christian part: 12

2 Kings 24 is the twenty-fourth chapter of the second part of the Books of Kings in the Hebrew Bible or the Second Book of Kings in the Old Testament of the Christian Bible. The book is a compilation of various annals recording the acts of the kings of Israel and Judah by a Deuteronomic compiler in the seventh century BCE, with a supplement added in the sixth century BCE. This chapter records the events during the reigns of Jehoiakim, Jehoiachin and Zedekiah, kings of Judah.

== Text ==
This chapter was originally written in the Hebrew language. It is divided into 20 verses.

=== Textual witnesses ===
Some early manuscripts containing the text of this chapter in Hebrew are of the Masoretic Text tradition, which includes the Codex Cairensis (895), Aleppo Codex (10th century), and Codex Leningradensis (1008).

There is also a translation into Koine Greek known as the Septuagint, made in the last few centuries BCE. Extant ancient manuscripts of the Septuagint version include Codex Vaticanus (B; $\mathfrak{G}$^{B}; 4th century) and Codex Alexandrinus (A; $\mathfrak{G}$^{A}; 5th century). (Note: The whole book of 2 Kings is missing from the extant Codex Sinaiticus.)

=== Old Testament references ===
- 2 Kings 24:1–7: 2 Chronicles 36:5–8
- 2 Kings 24:6–9: 2 Chronicles 36:9–10
- 2 Kings 24:10–17: Lamentations 1:1–22
- 2 Kings 24:18–20: 2 Chronicles 36:11–14; Jeremiah 52:1–3

== Analysis ==
A parallel pattern of sequence is observed in the final sections of 2 Kings between 2 Kings 11-20 and 2 Kings 21–25, as follows:

A. Athaliah, daughter of Ahab, kills royal seed (2 Kings 11:1)

B. Joash reigns (2 Kings 11–12)

C. Quick sequence of kings of Israel and Judah (2 Kings 13–16)

D. Fall of Samaria (2 Kings 17)

E. Revival of Judah under Hezekiah (2 Kings 18–20)

A'. Manasseh, a king like Ahab, promotes idolatry and kills the innocence (2 Kings 21)

B'. Josiah reigns (2 Kings 22–23)

C'. Quick succession of kings of Judah (2 Kings 24)

D'. Fall of Jerusalem (2 Kings 25)

E'. Elevation of Jehoiachin (2 Kings 25:27–30)

2 Kings 23–24 contain a 'neat scheme' within the chaos at the end of the kingdom of Judah:

2 Kings 23:31-24:2	2 Kings 24:8-25:1
Jehoahaz reigned for three months	Jehoiachin reigned for three months
Jehoahaz was imprisoned by Pharaoh Necho	Jehoiachin was imprisoned by Nebuchadnezzar
Necho placed Eliakim on throne and changed his name to Jehoiakim	Nebuchadnezzar placed Mattaniah on throne and changed his name to Zedekiah
Necho took Jehoahaz to Egypt; Jehoahaz died in Egypt	Nebuchadnezzar took Jehoiachin to Babylon; Jehoiachin was eventually elevated in Babylon

== Judah overrun by enemies (24:1–7) ==
With the placement of Jehoiakim as the puppet king in 609 BCE, Judah was firmly in Egypt's hand. When the Egyptian army of Necho II and his Assyrian allies were defeated by the Babylonian army of Nebuchadnezzar II and his allies—the Medes, Persians, and Scythians—in the Battle of Carchemish (605 BCE), Jehoiakim switched to be Babylonian vassal. In 601 BCE, a battle near Pelusium between Egypt and Babylonia resulted in heavy casualties on both sides, forcing Nebuchadnezzar to return to Babylon to rebuild his army, but Jehoiakim apparently considered this as a Babylonian defeat, so he revolted against Babylonia and returned under the Egypt's wing. During 601-598 BCE Nebuchadnezzar dispatched 'raiding parties from various surrounding nations to harass Judah', until he mustered strong enough army to attack Jerusalem (cf. Jeremiah 35:1, 11; Zephaniah 2:8–10; Babylonian Chronicles, ANET 564), while Egypt could not protect Judah anymore (verse 7). In late 598 BCE, the Babylonian army laid siege to Jerusalem for three months. Jehoiakim apparently died before the siege ended. The Book of Chronicles recorded that "Nebuchadnezzar king of Babylon ... bound him in fetters, to carry him to Babylon." Jeremiah prophesied that he died without proper funeral, describing the people of Judah "shall not lament for him, saying, 'Alas, master!' or 'Alas, his glory!' He shall be buried with the burial of a donkey, dragged and cast out beyond the gates of Jerusalem" (Jeremiah 22:18–19) "and his dead body shall be cast out to the heat of the day and the frost of the night" (Jeremiah 36:30). Josephus wrote that Nebuchadnezzar slew Jehoiakim along with high-ranking officers and then commanded Jehoiakim's body "to be thrown before the walls, without any burial."

=== Verse 1 ===
In his days Nebuchadnezzar king of Babylon came up, and Jehoiakim became his servant for three years. Then he turned and rebelled against him.

- "In his days": that is, 605 BCE, toward the end of the third year (Daniel 1:1) and the beginning of the fourth year (Jeremiah 25:1) of Jehoiakim's reign. The New King James Version's editors calculate the exiles' "seventy years of service" to the king of Babylon (Jeremiah 25:11-12) from this date.

=== Verse 2 ===
And the Lord sent against him raiding bands of Chaldeans, bands of Syrians, bands of Moabites, and bands of the people of Ammon; He sent them against Judah to destroy it, according to the word of the Lord which He had spoken by His servants the prophets.

- "Bands": or "troops"

=== Verse 3 ===
Surely at the commandment of the Lord this came upon Judah, to remove them from His sight because of the sins of Manasseh, according to all that he had done,

- "Surely at the commandment of the Lord": literally, "only upon the mouth of YHWH"; the Greek Septuagint and Syriac versions read "wrath" instead of "mouth".

=== Verse 6 ===
So Jehoiakim slept with his fathers, and Jehoiachin his son reigned in his place.

- "Slept": rendered as "rested" (NKJV) or "lay down".

=== Verse 7 ===
And the king of Egypt did not come again out of his land, for the king of Babylon had taken all that belonged to the king of Egypt from the Brook of Egypt to the river Euphrates.

- "Brook of Egypt": mostly identified with Wadi El-Arish an epiphemeral river pouring at the Mediterranean sea near the city of Arish (cf. 1 Kings 8:65).

== Jehoiachin, king of Judah (24:8–16) ==
The regnal account of Jehoiachin (also called Jeconiah) consists of an introductory regnal form (verses 8–9) and a two-part narrative describing the brief three months reign and his exile to Babylon. The first part is marked by the 'syntactically independent introductory temporal formula' of waw-consecutive verbal form, "in that time" (verse 10) regarding the siege of Jerusalem (verses 10–13), whereas the second one (verses 14–17) starts with a 'converted perfect verbal form', "and he exiled". There is no concluding regnal formula, because Jehoiachin's account did not end with his death. The record in 2 Kings 25:27-30 describes his release from the prison during the reign of Nebuchadnezzar's son, Evil-Merodach, stating that he was still alive the writing of the book of Kings was concluded.

=== Verse 8 ===
Jehoiachin was eighteen years old when he began to reign, and he reigned in Jerusalem three months. And his mother's name was Nehushta, the daughter of Elnathan of Jerusalem.

- Cross reference: 2 Chronicles 36:9
- "Jehoiachin" the son of Jehoiakim. His existence was attested by tablets found near the Ishtar Gate of ancient Babylon (now in Iraq), such as the Jehoiachin's Rations Tablets, dated to c. 592 BCE, mentioning his name in cuneiform (Akkadian: 𒅀𒀪𒌑𒆠𒉡, "Ia-'-ú-kinu") and his five sons as recipients of food rations in Babylon. "Jehoiachin" is the throne name of Jeconiah as written in Jeremiah 24:1; 28:4; 29:2, which has the abbreviated form "Coniah" in Jeremiah 22:24, 28; 37:1.

=== Verse 12 ===
And Jehoiachin the king of Judah went out to the king of Babylon, he, and his mother, and his servants, and his princes, and his officers: and the king of Babylon took him in the eighth year of his reign.

- "Eighth year": based on the ascension method of counting the regnal year in Judah, considering the time Nebuchadnezzar took control of the army prior to his father's death as year 1, whereas the Babylonian Chronicle records this as the seventh year (from the time Nebuchadnezzar's accession to the throne) which is also used in Jeremiah 52:28.

=== Verse 15 ===
And he carried Jehoiachin captive to Babylon. The king’s mother, the king’s wives, his officers, and the mighty of the land he carried into captivity from Jerusalem to Babylon.

- "The mighty of the land": The Targum translates it as "the magnates of the land".

=== Verse 17 ===
And the king of Babylon made Mattaniah his father's brother king in his stead, and changed his name to Zedekiah.

- "Mattaniah/Zedekiah: The youngest son of king Josiah (Jeremiah 1:3; Jeremiah 37:1) who was 10 years old when his father died, and 21 years old when he ascended the throne (verse 18). As Jehoiachin, who was eighteen at that time (verse 8) and could not have a son capable of reigning, Mattaniah as Jehoiachin's uncle had the first claim to the throne.
- "His father's brother": the "paternal uncle" (of King Jehoiachin) from Hebrew דֹד֖וֹ, dodow.

== Zedekiah, king of Judah (24:17–20) ==
The regnal account of Zedekiah consists of an introductory regnal part (verses 18–20) and the main part in 2 Kings 25:1–30, without the typical concluding part, because there was no king to succeeded him on the throne after Jerusalem was destroyed.

=== Verse 18 ===
Zedekiah was twenty and one years old when he began to reign, and he reigned eleven years in Jerusalem. And his mother's name was Hamutal, the daughter of Jeremiah of Libnah.

- Zedekiah: was the throne name of "Mattaniah", the younger brother of Jehoahaz from the same father and mother (cf. 2 Kings 23:31) and the uncle of Jehoiachin. Despite receiving advice from Jeremiah (Jeremiah 37:17–21; 38:14–28), Zedekiah chose to revolt against Babylon (cf. 2 Kings 24:20 and Ezekiel 17) and this caused the destruction of Jerusalem.
- Libnah: in Shephelah. Taking Hamutal as his wife may indicate Josiah's effort to strengthen this southwestern border area of Judah to resist Egypt.

=== Verse 20 ===
For because of the anger of the Lord it came to the point in Jerusalem and Judah that he cast them out from his presence.
And Zedekiah rebelled against the king of Babylon.

- "Zedekiah rebelled": as he sent a messenger to ask help from Pharaoh Hophra (Apries), king of Egypt (Ezekiel 17:15; cf. Jeremiah 37:5; Jeremiah 44:30), spurred by the eagerness of the neighboring nations (Edom, Ammon, Moab, Tyre and Sidon) to throw off the yoke of Babylon (Jeremiah 27:3) and the false prophecy of Hananiah (Jeremiah 28), despite the advice of Jeremiah to submit to Babylon.

== Illustration ==
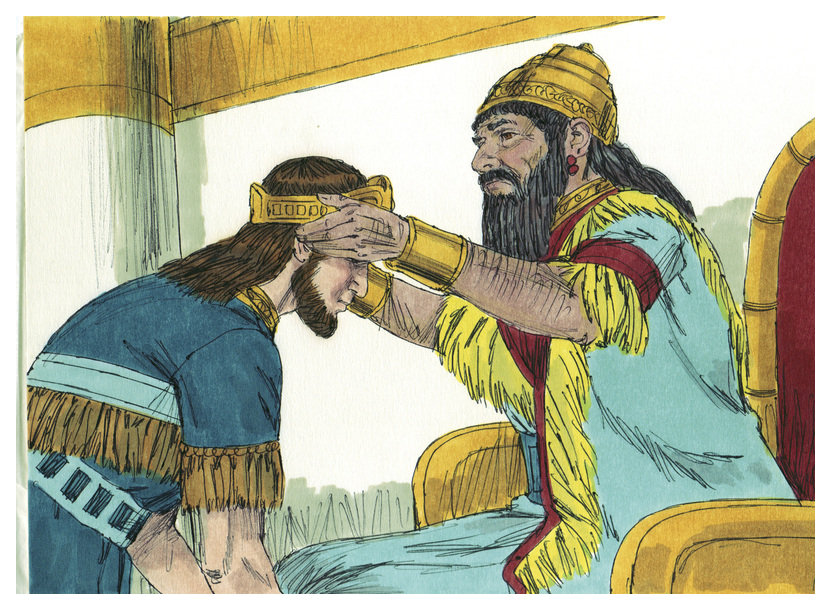
The king of Babylon made Zedekiah king of Judah.

== See also ==
- Babylonian Chronicles
- Jerusalem
- Nebuchadnezzar Chronicle
- Related Bible parts: 2 Kings 23, 2 Kings 25, 2 Chronicles 36, Jeremiah 37, Jeremiah 52, Luke 1

== Sources ==
- Cogan, Mordechai; Tadmor, Hayim (1988). II Kings: A New Translation. Anchor Yale Bible Commentaries. Vol. 11. Doubleday. ISBN 9780385023887.
- Collins, John J. (2014). "Chapter 14: 1 Kings 12 – 2 Kings 25". Introduction to the Hebrew Scriptures. Fortress Press. pp. 277–296. ISBN 9781451469233.
- Coogan, Michael David (2007). Coogan, Michael David; Brettler, Marc Zvi; Newsom, Carol Ann; Perkins, Pheme (eds.). The New Oxford Annotated Bible with the Apocryphal/Deuterocanonical Books: New Revised Standard Version, Issue 48 (Augmented 3rd ed.). Oxford University Press. ISBN 9780195288810.
- Dietrich, Walter (2007). "13. 1 and 2 Kings". In Barton, John; Muddiman, John (eds.). The Oxford Bible Commentary (first (paperback) ed.). Oxford University Press. pp. 232–266. ISBN 978-0199277186.
- Fretheim, Terence E (1997). First and Second Kings. Westminster John Knox Press. ISBN 978-0-664-25565-7.
- Halley, Henry H. (1965). Halley's Bible Handbook: an abbreviated Bible commentary (24th (revised) ed.). Zondervan Publishing House. ISBN 0-310-25720-4.
- Leithart, Peter J. (2006). 1 & 2 Kings. Brazos Theological Commentary on the Bible. Brazos Press. ISBN 978-1587431258.
- McFall, Leslie (1991), "Translation Guide to the Chronological Data in Kings and Chronicles" (PDF), Bibliotheca Sacra, 148: 3–45, archived from the original (PDF) on August 27, 2010
- McKane, William (1993). "Kings, Book of". In Metzger, Bruce M; Coogan, Michael D (eds.). The Oxford Companion to the Bible. Oxford University Press. pp. 409–413. ISBN 978-0195046458.
- Nelson, Richard Donald (1987). First and Second Kings. Westminster John Knox Press. ISBN 978-0-664-22084-6.
- Pritchard, James B (1969). Ancient Near Eastern texts relating to the Old Testament (3 ed.). Princeton University Press. ISBN 9780691035031.
- Sweeney, Marvin (2007). I & II Kings: A Commentary. Westminster John Knox Press. ISBN 978-0-664-22084-6.
- The Nelson Study Bible. Thomas Nelson, Inc. 1997. ISBN 9780840715999.
- Thiele, Edwin R. (1983). The Mysterious Numbers of the Hebrew Kings (3rd ed.). Grand Rapids, Michigan: Zondervan. ISBN 978-0-310-36010-0.
- Würthwein, Ernst (1995). The Text of the Old Testament. Translated by Rhodes, Erroll F. Grand Rapids, MI: Wm. B. Eerdmans. ISBN 0-8028-0788-7.
