= Jeremiah 21 =

Book of Jeremiah, chapter 21

- ← chapter 20 chapter 22 →
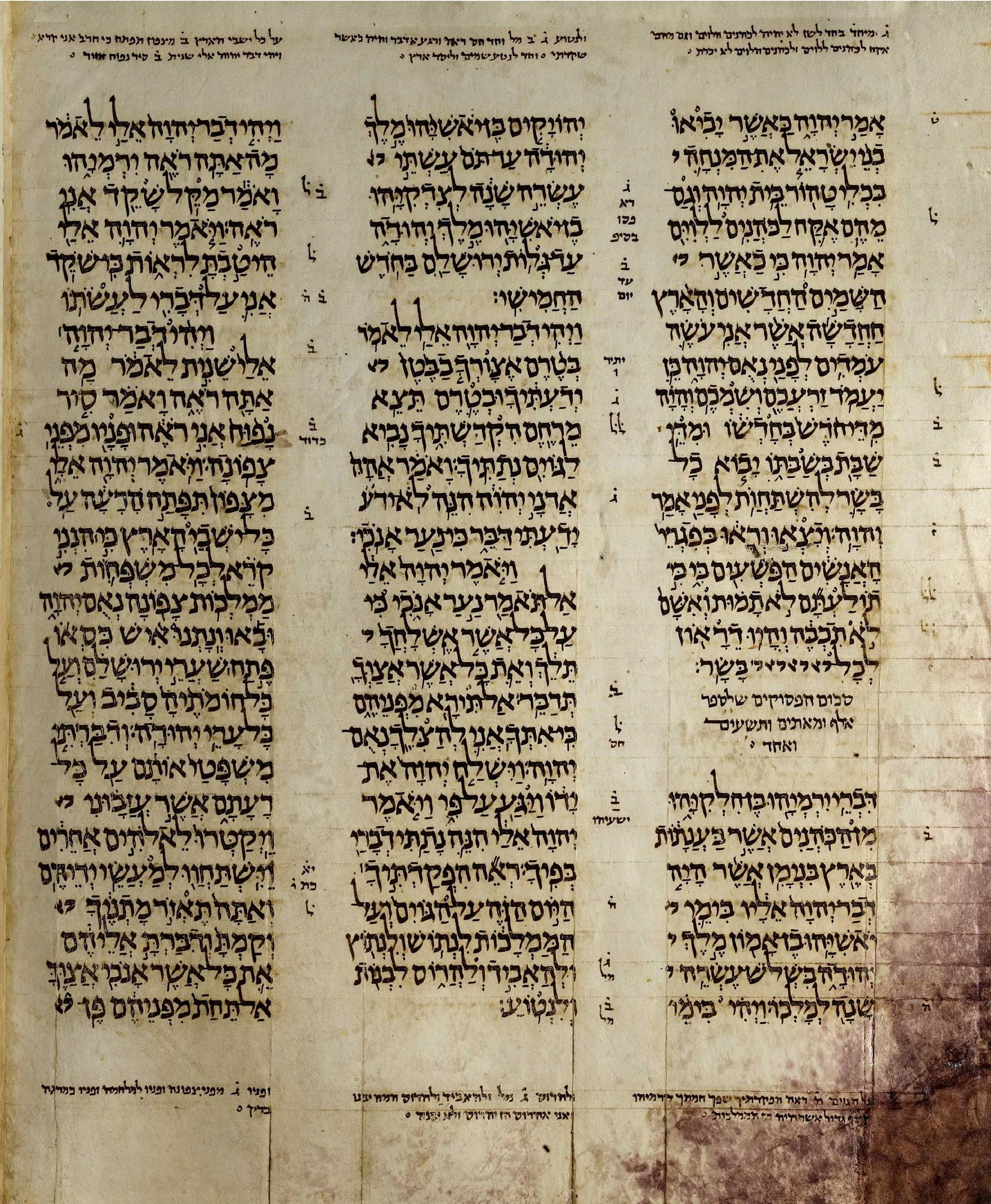
- A high resolution scan of the Aleppo Codex showing the Book of Jeremiah (the sixth book in Nevi'im).
- Book: Book of Jeremiah
- Hebrew Bible part: Nevi'im
- Order in the Hebrew part: 6
- Category: Latter Prophets
- Christian Bible part: Old Testament
- Order in the Christian part: 24

Jeremiah 21 is the twenty-first chapter of the Book of Jeremiah in the Hebrew Bible or the Old Testament of the Christian Bible. This book contains prophecies attributed to the prophet Jeremiah, and is one of the Books of the Prophets. This chapter contains a record of Jeremiah's message to King Zedekiah's emissaries (Jeremiah 21:1–10) and a warning to the House of David (Jeremiah 21:11–14).

== Text ==
The original text of this chapter was written in Hebrew language. This chapter is divided into 14 verses.

=== Textual witnesses ===
Some early manuscripts containing the text of this chapter in Hebrew are of the Masoretic Text tradition, which includes the Codex Cairensis (895), the Petersburg Codex of the Prophets (916), Aleppo Codex (10th century), Codex Leningradensis (1008). Some fragments containing parts of this chapter were found among the Dead Sea Scrolls, i.e., 4QJer^{a} (4Q70; 225-175 BCE) with the extant verse 1, and 4QJer^{c} (4Q72; 1st century BC) with extant verses 7‑10 (similar to Masoretic Text).

There is also a translation into Koine Greek known as the Septuagint, made in the last few centuries BCE. Extant ancient manuscripts of the Septuagint version include Codex Vaticanus (B; $\mathfrak{G}$^{B}; 4th century), Codex Sinaiticus (S; BHK: $\mathfrak{G}$^{S}; 4th century), Codex Alexandrinus (A; $\mathfrak{G}$^{A}; 5th century) and Codex Marchalianus (Q; $\mathfrak{G}$^{Q}; 6th century).

== Parashot ==
The parashah sections listed here are based on the Aleppo Codex. Jeremiah 21 is a part of the Eighth prophecy (Jeremiah 21-24) in the section of Prophecies of Destruction (Jeremiah 1-25). {P}: open parashah; {S}: closed parashah.

{P} 21:1-3 {S} 21:1-3 {S} 21:4-10 {S} 21:11-14 [22:1-5 {P}]

== Verse 1 ==
The word which came to Jeremiah from the Lord when King Zedekiah sent to him Pashhur the son of Melchiah, and Zephaniah the son of Maaseiah, the priest:

Biblical commentator F. B. Huey notes that some scholars regard a later passage, Jeremiah 37:3–10, as a "background for Jeremiah 21:1-7".

"Pashhur" (or Pashur), the son of Melchiah, is also named in Jeremiah 38:1. "Zephaniah the son of Maaseiah" is described as the "second priest" or deputy in Jeremiah 52:24; later with others, he came again to Jeremiah for advice (Jeremiah 37:3–4) and was executed by Nebuchadnezzar at Riblah (Jeremiah 52:24–27). According to Huey, he "was not hostile to Jeremiah" (Jeremiah 29:25,29; Jeremiah 37:3).

== Verse 9 ==
He who remains in this city shall die by the sword, by famine, and by pestilence; but he who goes out and defects to the Chaldeans who besiege you, he shall live, and his life shall be as a prize to him.

Huey, and others as well, notes that the wording of this verse is similar to Jeremiah 38:2; Huey concludes that the prophecy could have been announced repeatedly.

== Verse 13 ==
"Behold, I am against you, O inhabitant of the valley,
And rock of the plain."

The Jerusalem Bible suggests that this announcement is "probably addressed to the inhabitants of the royal palace built on Ophel which looks down on the valley ('plain') of the Kidron.

== See also ==
- Babylon
- Chaldea
- David
- Jeremiah
- Jerusalem
- Kingdom of Judah
- Nebuchadnezzar
- Pashhur
- Zedekiah
- Zephaniah
- Related Bible parts: 1 Chronicles 24, Jeremiah 38, Jeremiah 39, Jeremiah 52

== Sources ==
- Coogan, Michael David (2007). Coogan, Michael David; Brettler, Marc Zvi; Newsom, Carol Ann; Perkins, Pheme (eds.). The New Oxford Annotated Bible with the Apocryphal/Deuterocanonical Books: New Revised Standard Version, Issue 48 (Augmented 3rd ed.). Oxford University Press. ISBN 9780195288810.
- Huey, F. B. (1993). The New American Commentary - Jeremiah, Lamentations: An Exegetical and Theological Exposition of Holy Scripture, NIV Text. B&H Publishing Group. ISBN 9780805401165.
- Ryle, Herbert Edward (2009). The Cambridge Bible for Schools and Colleges Paperback. BiblioBazaar. ISBN 9781117708690.
- Ulrich, Eugene, ed. (2010). The Biblical Qumran Scrolls: Transcriptions and Textual Variants. Brill.
- Würthwein, Ernst (1995). The Text of the Old Testament. Translated by Rhodes, Erroll F. Grand Rapids, MI: Wm. B. Eerdmans. ISBN 978-0-8028-0788-5.
