= Malchijah =

Biblical name

Malchijah (Hebrew: מַלְכִּיָּה, also Malkijah, Malchiah, Melchiah, or Melchias) is a biblical name belonging to several persons mentioned in the Hebrew Bible and means "Yahweh is King" or "the king is Yahweh".

== In 1 Chronicles ==
The first Malchijah mentioned in the Bible was a priest of ancient Israel after the order of Aaron, during the reign of King David in the 10th century BC. Malchijah led the fifth of the 24 priestly divisions. The biblical passage of 1 Chronicles 24 documents the division of the priests during the reign of King David. These priests were all descendants of Aaron, who had four sons: Nadab, Abihu, Eleazar and Ithamar. However, Nadab and Abihu died before Aaron and only Eleazar and Ithamar had sons. One priest, Zadok, from Eleazar's descendants and another priest, Ahimelech, from Ithamar's descendants were designated to help create the various priestly orders. Sixteen of Eleazar's descendants were selected to head priestly orders while only eight of Ithamar's descendants were so chosen. The passage states that this was done because of the greater number of leaders among Eleazar's descendants. Lots were drawn to designate the order of ministering for the heads of the priestly orders when they entered the temple. Since each order was responsible for ministering during a different week, Malchijah's order was stationed as a watch at the Tabernacle during the fifth week of the year on the Hebrew calendar.

== In Nehemiah ==
Persons with the name of Malchijah are also mentioned in Nehemiah. Malchijah, the son of Harim, is mentioned in Nehemiah 3:11 as a worker with Nehemiah and Eliashib on the repairs to the walls of Jerusalem. Malchijah, the son of Rechab, was another worker mentioned in Nehemiah 3:14 with Nehemiah and Eliashib on the Jerusalem walls repair. Another reference to Malchijah as a goldsmith working with Nehemiah and Eliashib is mentioned in Nehemiah 3:31 and a Malchijah is named as one of those who stood with Ezra during the reading of the law in Nehemiah 8:4. In Nehemiah 12:42, another reference to one of these Malchijah's is mentioned again as Nehemiah's assistant during the dedication service of the restored walls of Jerusalem.

== In Ezra ==
In Ezra 10:25, two sons of Parosh are named among those of Israel who had taken foreign wives.

== In Jeremiah ==
A Malchiah or Melchiah was mentioned in the Book of Jeremiah, Chapter 21, Verse 1.

Melchiah was a son in the kingdom of Zedekiah, and the father of Pashur, the messenger who was charged with taking a message from the King to Jeremiah asking for God's intervention in the war against Nebuchadnezzar.
