= Jeremiah 24 =

Book of Jeremiah, chapter 24

- ← chapter 23 chapter 25 →
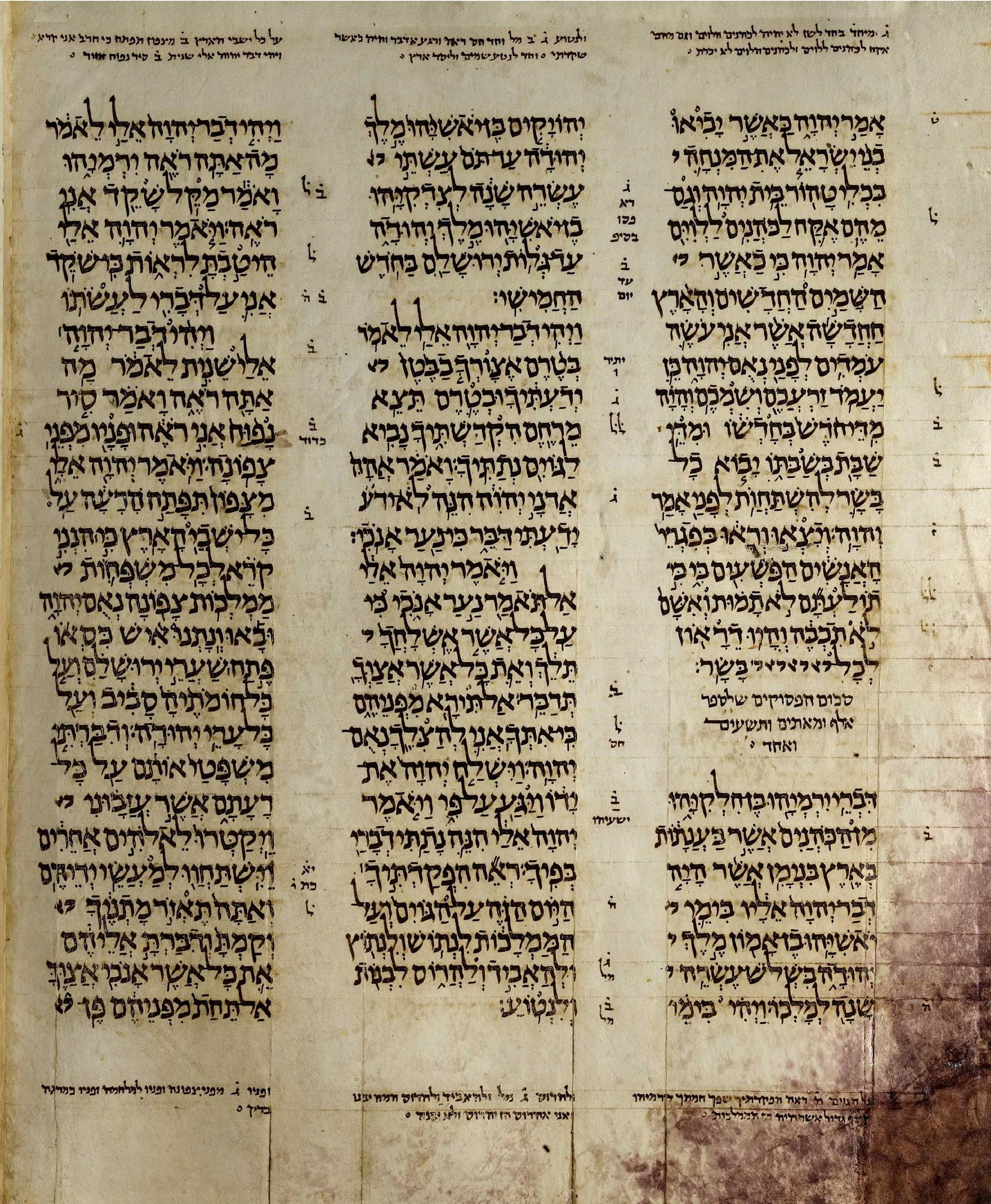
- A high resolution scan of the Aleppo Codex showing the Book of Jeremiah (the sixth book in Nevi'im).
- Book: Book of Jeremiah
- Hebrew Bible part: Nevi'im
- Order in the Hebrew part: 6
- Category: Latter Prophets
- Christian Bible part: Old Testament
- Order in the Christian part: 24

Jeremiah 24 is the twenty-fourth chapter of the Book of Jeremiah in the Hebrew Bible or the Old Testament of the Christian Bible. This book contains prophecies attributed to the prophet Jeremiah, and is one of the Books of the Prophets. This chapter concerns Jeremiah's vision of two baskets of figs.

== Text ==
The original text of this chapter was written in the Hebrew language. This chapter is divided into 10 verses.

=== Textual witnesses ===
Some early manuscripts containing the text of this chapter in Hebrew are of the Masoretic Text tradition, which includes the Codex Cairensis (895), the Petersburg Codex of the Prophets (916), Aleppo Codex (10th century), Codex Leningradensis (1008).

There is also a translation into Koine Greek known as the Septuagint, made in the last few centuries BCE. Extant ancient manuscripts of the Septuagint version include Codex Vaticanus (B; $\mathfrak{G}$^{B}; 4th century), Codex Sinaiticus (S; BHK: $\mathfrak{G}$^{S}; 4th century), Codex Alexandrinus (A; $\mathfrak{G}$^{A}; 5th century) and Codex Marchalianus (Q; $\mathfrak{G}$^{Q}; 6th century).

== Parashot ==
The parashah sections listed here are based on the Aleppo Codex. Jeremiah 24 is a part of the Eighth prophecy (Jeremiah 21-24) in the section of Prophecies of Destruction (Jeremiah 1-25). {P}: open parashah; {S}: closed parashah.

{P} 24:1-2 {P} 24:3 {P} 24:4-7 {S} 24:8-10 {P}

== Verse 1 ==
The Lord showed me, and there were two baskets of figs set before the temple of the Lord, after Nebuchadnezzar king of Babylon had carried away captive Jeconiah the son of Jehoiakim, king of Judah, and the princes of Judah with the craftsmen and smiths, from Jerusalem, and had brought them to Babylon.

The time of the vision is after 597 BCE. This vision is "reminiscent of that of Amos" in Amos 8:1–2.

== Verse 5 ==
"Thus says the Lord, the God of Israel: 'Like these good figs, so will I acknowledge those who are carried away captive from Judah, whom I have sent out of this place for their own good, into the land of the Chaldeans.'"

- "Good figs": While the people at that time assumed those sent to the exile are the objects of God's wrath, God says that He favors them, and will return them back to Israel to become a faithful nation.

== Verse 8 ==
'And as the bad figs which cannot be eaten, they are so bad’—surely thus says the Lord—‘so will I give up Zedekiah the king of Judah, his princes, the residue of Jerusalem who remain in this land, and those who dwell in the land of Egypt.'

- "Bad figs": Those remained in Jerusalem thought they were favored by God, but God declared that He would destroy every one of them, including king Zedekiah.

== See also ==
- Babylon
- Chaldea
- Egypt
- Israel
- Jeconiah
- Jehoiakim
- Jerusalem
- Judah
- Nebuchadnezzar
- Zedekiah
- Related Bible parts: Jeremiah 1, Jeremiah 32, Jeremiah 38, Jeremiah 39, Jeremiah 44; Amos 7, Amos 8; Zechariah 1, Zechariah 2

== Bibliography ==
- Würthwein, Ernst (1995). The Text of the Old Testament. Translated by Rhodes, Erroll F. Grand Rapids, MI: Wm. B. Eerdmans. ISBN 0-8028-0788-7.
