= Ir David Foundation =

Israeli settler association promoting Jewish connection to Jerusalem

- אלע"ד
- Abbreviation: Elad
- Formation: 1986; 40 years ago
- Founder: David Be'eri
- Founded at: Jerusalem, Israel
- Type: Non-profit
- Purpose: Strengthening Jewish connection to Jerusalem and renewing Jewish community in the City of David
- Headquarters: Jerusalem, Israel
- Services: Tourism, education, archaeological excavations, property acquisition
- Fields: Historical preservation, archaeology, cultural heritage, real estate
- Website: www.cityofdavid.org.il

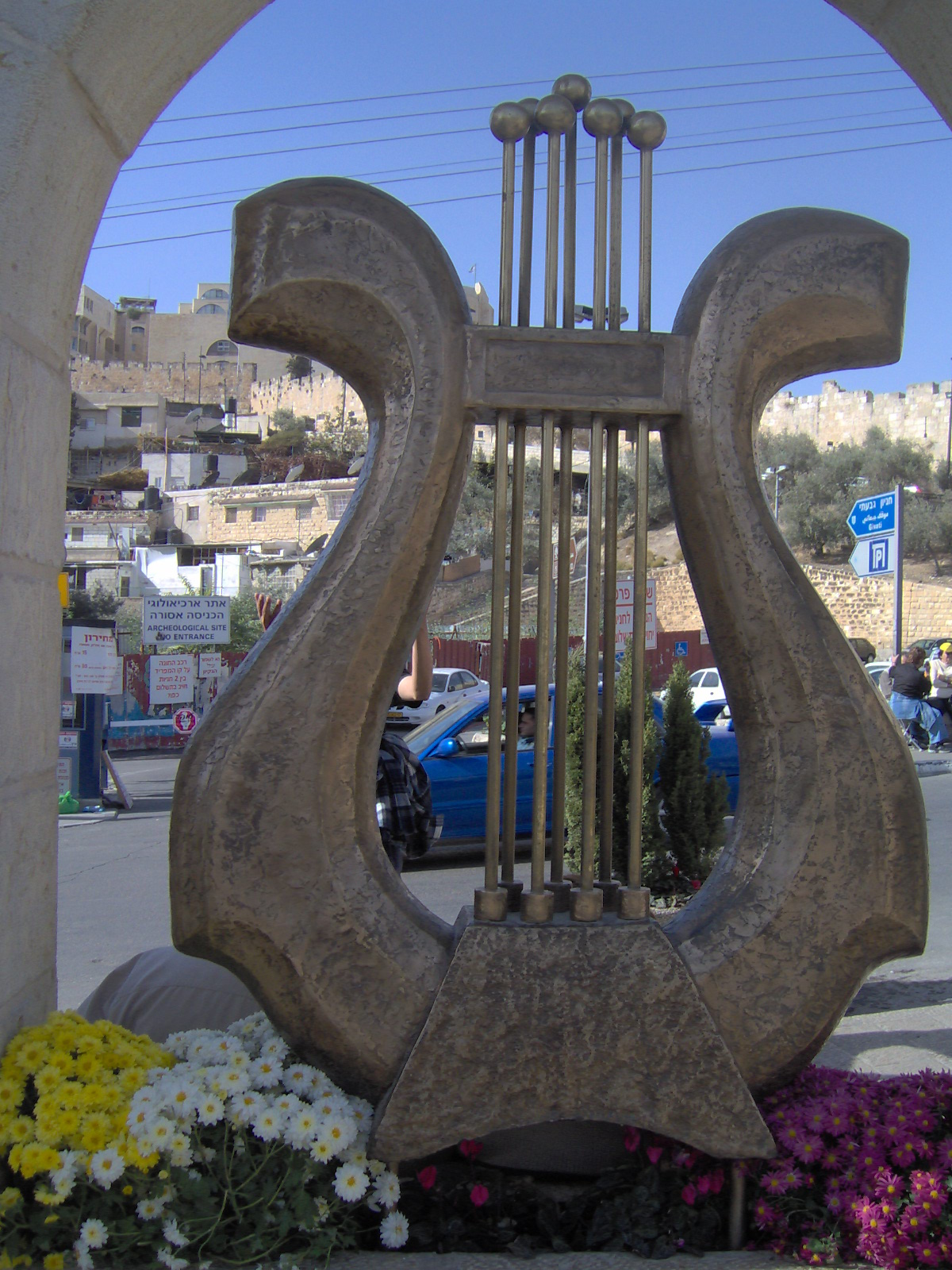
A statue of the organization's symbol (King David's harp)

Ir David Foundation or City of David Foundation, commonly known as Elad [El'ad] (Hebrew: אלע"ד, an acronym for אל עיר דוד 'to the City of David'), is a Jerusalem-based Israeli settler association which aims to strengthen the Jewish connection to Jerusalem, and renew the Jewish community in the City of David, which is also part of the neighborhood of Silwan. The foundation works to achieve its goals through tourism, education, archaeological excavations and obtaining homes in the area to establish a Jewish presence.

The Ir David Foundation has been criticized for its archaeological practices and real estate activities. Critics argue that the foundation's archaeological excavations are often carried out with a political agenda, aiming to assert Jewish historical claims over the area at the expense of Palestinian residents. Elad has purchased properties in Silwan, in some cases leading to the eviction of Palestinian families.

== Background ==
"Ir David", or the "City of David", is the name given to a site beyond the southern edge of Jerusalem's Temple Mount and Old City, with the Tyropoeon Valley on its west, the Hinnom valley to the south, and the Kidron Valley on the east. It was known as Mount Ophel during the late Ottoman period. Montagu Parker claimed in a 1911 interview that his exhibition had provided evidence that the "ancient City of David" was on Mount Ophel. The name was later used by the British Mandatory Palestine administration for the archaeological site and eventually as a name for the ridge or Ophel.

Modern Jewish settlement on the ridge in the City of David began in 1873–1874, when the Meyuchas family, a Jewish rabbinical and merchant family that had lived in Jerusalem since their expulsion from Spain, moved a short distance outside the city walls to a house in the area. With the outbreak of 1936 riots Jews were advised by the British authorities to leave the area since they could not guarantee their safety. The foundation was founded in 1986 by David Be'eri, a former deputy commander of Duvdevan Unit, with the intention to purchase the former Meyuchas family home and other properties in the city. In 1986 they were granted the authority to work on behalf of the Jewish National Fund to reclaim land in the area. For a long time, Elad refused to provide the names of its funders and when they did they requested successfully that the names be kept under privilege. In 2016, the Israeli newspaper Haaretz revealed that the organization received 450 million shekels (US$115 million) in donations between 2006 and 2013. Most of the money came via corporations in international tax havens whose owners could not be identified. About half of Elad's income between 2003 and 2018, amounting to 348 million shekels, came from four companies registered in the Virgin Islands. Documents in the leaked FinCEN Files revealed in 2020 that at least three of the four companies are owned by Russian–Israeli billionaire Roman Abramovich.

== Activities ==
=== Tourism ===
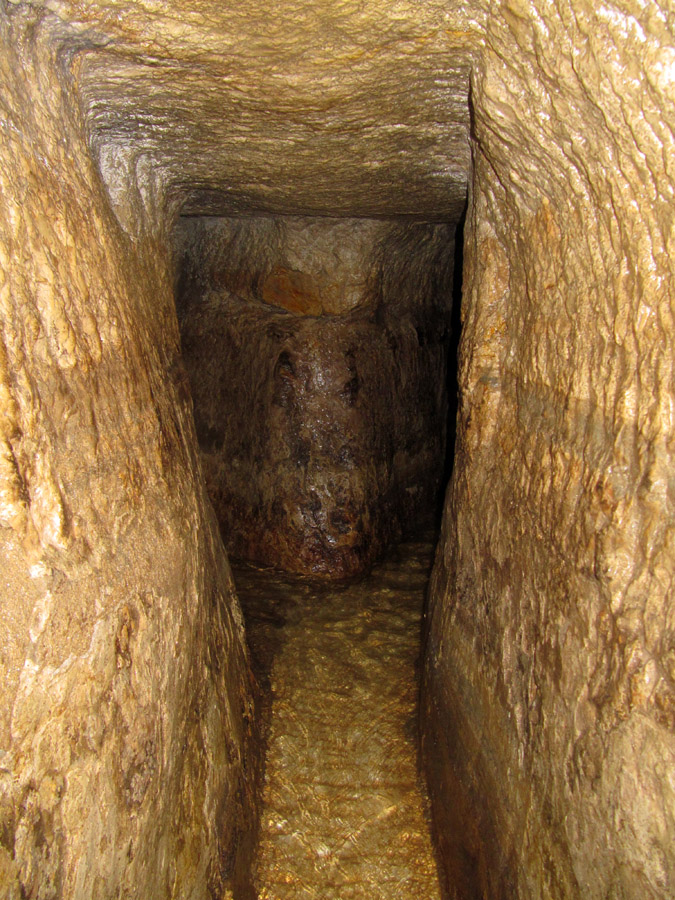
Inside the Siloam tunnel 2010

To expand tourist activity, the foundation created a massive marketing campaign which led to a sharp increase in the number of visitors in recent years. In 2001 the foundation had only 25,000 visitors, but 250,000 in 2006 and 350,000 in 2007. In a program called "Ancient Jerusalem", they bring visitors to the three sites of Biblical Jerusalem, the City of David, Armon HaNetziv and the Mount of Olives. There were 450,000 visitors in 2011.

=== Archaeological excavations ===
Ir David Foundation funds most of the archaeological excavations conducted in recent years in the City of David and the surrounding areas. All excavations are conducted by the Antiquities Authority, or with their approval. Among the many excavation sites the association found in 2005 the proposed Pool of Siloam 200 meters from another "Pool of Siloam" which was a fifth-century reconstruction and the road that connected the Spring to the Temple.

In December 2008 excavations funded by the foundation found a large hoard of over 250 gold coins, dated to around the seventh century near the end of the Byzantine period. The foundation also funded excavation of a house the archaeologists suspect belonged to Helena of Adiabene, a fourth-century mansion, and an ancient water tunnel.

=== Home purchases ===
Ir David purchases houses in Silwan and rents them to Jewish families. According to the foundation, some houses in Silwan were originally owned by Jews before the establishment of the state, representing the Jewish settlement of Kfar Shiloah, established for immigrants from Yemen in the late 19th century. As of 2009, 75 Jewish families live in properties owned by the Association.

The Ir David foundation acquires property in the city of David and surroundings in one of four ways:

- Locating assets belonging to Jews in the city of David and seeking legal action to return them to the original owner.
- Buying properties declared absentee property. According to Haaretz, Elad took control of properties by making a very dubious use of the Israeli 'Absentees Property Law'
- Persuading Arab residents to voluntarily sell their homes to Jews.

The foundation endeavours to buy up property from Muslims in the area, but the acquisition of houses is complex, since under Waqf law, Muslims are not permitted to sell their land to Jews, since according to Islamic jurisprudence the lands they dwell on belongs to Allah. Elad employs Muslim middle men as brokers to bypass the Waqf rules and to purchase the properties.

In September 2014, Ir David Foundation aided residents moving into 25 apartments in Silwan, the largest acquisition in the foundation's history. The apartments were spread over seven different buildings, which were purchased by Ir David Foundation through a US shadow organization.

== Funding ==
The largest single funder of the organization is Russian oligarch Roman Abramovich and the companies he controls, which have donated $100 million. These donations came to light through a leak of bank documents known as the FinCEN Files that had been submitted to the Financial Crimes Enforcement Network.

== Criticism ==
=== On archaeology ===
In 1997, the organisation was sued by the Israeli state for damaging archaeological remains and for building on a historic site without a permit, and the Israel Antiquities Authority strongly recommended that the upkeep and control of the archaeological sites not be handed over to the organisation. In 1998 a proposed contract to do this was annulled. However, in 2002 the contract was re-confirmed, this time without opposition from the IAA, and from that time the organisation has had responsibility for the preservation and maintenance of the City of David National Park.

In 1999, unauthorized construction on the Temple Mount by the Waqf resulted in trucks fulls of dirt filled with archaeological artifacts being dumped. In 2005 the Ir David Foundation joined a Bar Ilan University and the National Parks Authority, Temple Mount Sifting Project, where volunteers and professionals recover these artifacts. Thousands of artifacts have been recovered including 5,000 ancient coins. In March 2017, the Temple Mount Sifting Project announced it stopped collaborating with the Ir David Foundation. The reason was not published.

In 2011, a leading Israeli specialist on the archeology of Jerusalem, Dr. Eilat Mazar, who in the past collaborated with the Elad foundation, wrote a letter protesting the foundation's lack commitment to "scientific archeological work". In particular she expressed concerns over their intention to demolish a wall in a subterranean trench called "Jeremiah's Pit," which she regards as part of a tourist gimmick. The Antiquities Authority replied that she was only trying to appropriate the site for herself. Elad countered that her contract forbids her from complaining about future excavations.

Elad was blamed by Silwan residents when a channel dug for archaeological excavations partially collapsed in December 2011 near the village's mosque. The excavations were carried out by the Israel Antiquities Authority and funded by Elad.

=== On evictions ===
Critics accuse the foundation of methodically attempting to "Judaicize" the City of David / Silwan area by enhancing Jewish claims and presence at the expense of local Palestinians. The foundation says its actions are legal under Israeli law.

In December 2011, joint activities between the Elad Association and the Jewish National Fund in Israel (JNF-KKL) led to Seth Morrison's resignation from the board of JNF-USA, the JNF's arm in the United States. Morrison resigned in protest at the decision by Himnuta, a subsidiary of JNF-KKL, to launch eviction proceedings against the Sumarin family, who lived in the Silwan neighborhood of East Jerusalem. In the case of the Sumarin family, the children of the original owner, Musa Sumarin, were declared absentees after his death even though there were other family members living in the home at the time. In 1991, the Israeli government transferred the property to the JNF subsidiary. In a letter to The Jewish Daily Forward, Morrison said the action on the Sumarin home "is not an isolated case. JNF has gained ownership of other Palestinian homes in East Jerusalem and, in many instances, then transferred these properties through its subsidiaries to Elad, a settler organization whose purpose is to 'Judaize' East Jerusalem". Under Israel's controversial Absentee Property Law, the state may reclaim homes whose owners were not present in 1967, when Israel took control of East Jerusalem. Morrison said that the expulsion of the Sumarin family was a violation of human rights, and part of the systematic transfer of Palestinian property to ideological settlers who wish to put facts on the ground that hinder a lasting peace agreement. A campaign against the eviction was launched by T'ruah (then known as Rabbis for Human Rights), and by the Sheikh Jarrah Solidarity Movement, and in the United Kingdom by the Jewish organization Yachad. In response to these campaigns the JNF delayed the eviction.

=== On authority over national park ===
Ir Amim and others petitioned the High Court in July 2010, to cancel an agreement between the Israel Nature and Parks Authority (INPA) and Elad because of secret transfer of authority to Elad, which would carry out a political agenda. The Court ordered some changes and a new three-year contract was signed.
