= 2 Kings 25 =

Chapter of the Hebrew Bible and Old Testament

- ← chapter 24 1 Chronicles 1 →
- The pages containing the Books of Kings (1 & 2 Kings) Leningrad Codex (1008 CE).
- Book: Second Book of Kings
- Hebrew Bible part: Nevi'im
- Order in the Hebrew part: 4
- Category: Former Prophets
- Christian Bible part: Old Testament
- Order in the Christian part: 12

2 Kings 25 is the twenty-fifth and final chapter of the second part of the Books of Kings in the Hebrew Bible or the Second Book of Kings in the Old Testament of the Christian Bible. The book is a compilation of recorded acts of the kings of Israel and Judah by a Deuteronomic compiler in the seventh century BCE; a supplement was added in the sixth century BCE. This chapter records the events during the reign of Zedekiah, the last king of Judah, the fall of Jerusalem, the governorship of Gedaliah, and the release of Jehoiachin from prison in Babylon.

== Text ==
This chapter was originally written in Biblical Hebrew. It is divided into 30 verses.

=== Textual witnesses ===
Some early manuscripts containing the text of this chapter in Hebrew are of the Masoretic Text tradition, which includes the Codex Cairensis (895), Aleppo Codex (10th century), and Codex Leningradensis (1008).

There is also a translation into Koine Greek known as the Septuagint, made in the last few centuries BCE. Extant ancient manuscripts of the Septuagint version include Codex Vaticanus (B; $\mathfrak{G}$^{B}; 4th century) and Codex Alexandrinus (A; $\mathfrak{G}$^{A}; 5th century). (Note: The whole book of 2 Kings is missing from the extant Codex Sinaiticus.)

=== Old Testament references ===
- 2 Kings 25:1–7: 2 Chronicles 36:15–21; Jeremiah 39:1–10
- 2 Kings 25:8–17: Jeremiah 52:12–23
- 2 Kings 25:18–21: Jeremiah 52:24–30
- 2 Kings 25:22–24: Jeremiah 40:1–16
- 2 Kings 25:25–26: Jeremiah 41:1–10
- 2 Kings 25:27–40: Jeremiah 52:31–34

== Analysis ==
A parallel pattern of sequence is observed in the final sections of 2 Kings between 2 Kings 11-20 and 2 Kings 21-25, as follows:

A. Athaliah, daughter of Ahab, kills royal seed (2 Kings 11:1)

B. Joash reigns (2 Kings 11–12)

C. Quick sequence of kings of Israel and Judah (2 Kings 13–16)

D. Fall of Samaria (2 Kings 17)

E. Revival of Judah under Hezekiah (2 Kings 18–20)

A'. Manasseh, a king like Ahab, promotes idolatry and kills the innocence (2 Kings 21)

B'. Josiah reigns (2 Kings 22–23)

C'. Quick succession of kings of Judah (2 Kings 24)

D'. Fall of Jerusalem (2 Kings 25)

E'. Elevation of Jehoiachin (2 Kings 25:27–30)

== The fall of Jerusalem and exile of Judah (25:1–21) ==
King Nebuchadnezzar II of Babylon took the last of Solomon's accumulated masses of gold and silver (verse 15) as he burned Solomon's Temple, palace and much of the city of Jerusalem (verse 9). The fall of Jerusalem parallels the fall of Samaria:

1. Both cities were besieged three times, from two different enemies. Samaria was twice besieged by the Arameans (1 Kings 20:1; 2 Kings 6:24) and once by the Assyrians (2 Kings 17:5), whereas Jerusalem was besieged once by the Assyrians (2 Kings 18–19) and twice by the Babylonians (2 Kings 24:10; 25:1). Each city was ultimately destroyed in its third siege.
2. The attacks happened after the kings of Israel and Judah revolted against powerful neighbouring regional states.

The last siege of Jerusalem lasted nineteen months (verses 1, 8), until 'the people of the land' being overcome by hunger (verse 3, Lamentations 2:11–12; 4:4–5, 9–10). Zedekiah tried to escape the city, but was captured and heavily punished (verses 4–7). Thereafter, Jerusalem and its remaining inhabitants suffered destruction, burning, plundering, deportation and executions (verses 8–21).

=== Verse 4 ===
And the city was broken up, and all the men of war fled by night by the way of the gate between two walls, which is by the king's garden: (now the Chaldees were against the city round about:) and the king went the way toward the plain.

- Cross references: Jeremiah 39:4; Jeremiah 52:7; Ezekiel 12:12
- "The city was broken up": in Hebrew: "the city was breached".
- "The king’s garden": mentioned in Nehemiah 3:15 in conjunction with the pool of Siloam and the stairs that go down from the City of David, which is in the southern part of the city near the Tyropoeon Valley (supported by the reference to the "two walls", that refers to the walls on the eastern and western hills).
- "Plain" or "Arabah" (עֲרָבָה), the Jordan Valley; also called "the rift valley", extending northward of the Dead Sea past Galilee and southward to the Gulf of Aqaba, here the "plain" specifically refers to the southern part of the Jordan Valley, which has access to cross the Jordan River to Moab or Ammon (Jeremiah 40:14; 41:15 mention that the Ammonites were known to harbor fugitives from the Babylonians).

=== Verse 7 ===
And they slew the sons of Zedekiah before his eyes, and put out the eyes of Zedekiah, and bound him with fetters of brass, and carried him to Babylon.

- Cross references: Jeremiah 39:7; Jeremiah 52:11
- Huey notes the fulfillment of two prophecies in this verse:
  1. Zedekiah would see the king of Babylon and then be taken to Babylon (the prophecy recorded in Jeremiah 32:4–5; Jeremiah 34:3)
  2. Zedekiah would die in Babylon without being able to see that country (the prophecy recorded in Ezekiel 12:13)

=== Verse 8 ===
And in the fifth month, on the seventh day of the month, which is the nineteenth year of king Nebuchadnezzar king of Babylon, came Nebuzaradan, captain of the guard, a servant of the king of Babylon, unto Jerusalem:

- "The fifth month, on seventh day": or the 7th of Av, was the start of the destruction of Jerusalem. According to the Talmud, the actual destruction of the First Temple built by King Solomon began on the Ninth of Av (Tisha B'Av), and it continued to burn throughout the Tenth of Av (Jeremiah 52:12). Gill interprets that Nebuzaradan departed from Riblah on the 7th and entered Jerusalem on the 10th. The Talmud reads:

"On the seventh of Av, gentiles entered the Sanctuary, and on the seventh and the eighth they ate there and desecrated it, by engaging in acts of fornication. And on the ninth, adjacent to nightfall, they set fire to it, and it continuously burned the entire day, as it is stated: "Woe unto us, for the day has declined, for the shadows of the evening are stretched out" (Jeremiah 6:4).

- "Nebuzaradan" (2 Kings 25:8, 11, 20; Jeremiah 52:30; Jeremiah 39:9,11, 40:2, 5): mentioned (as Nabuzeriddinam or Nabû-zēr-iddin) in a Babylonian cuneiform inscription known as Nebuchadnezzar II's Prism (column 3, line 36 of prism EŞ 7834, in the Istanbul Archaeological Museum).

== Governorship of Gedaliah (25:22–26) ==
The aftermath of Jerusalem's defeat seemed to start promisingly, but ended disastrously when the Babylon-appointed governor, Gedaliah ben Ahikam ben Safan was killed by Ishmael ben Nethaniah ben Elishama of the royal family, causing the remaining inhabitants to flee to Egypt in fear of Babylonian reprisal. This passage probably is a summary of a more detailed report in Jeremiah 40–41.

=== Verse 25 ===
But it came to pass in the seventh month, that Ishmael the son of Nethaniah, the son of Elishama, of the seed royal, came, and ten men with him, and smote Gedaliah, that he died, and the Jews and the Chaldees that were with him at Mizpah.

The assassination of Gedaliah was commemorated in Fast of Gedalia, one of the fast days lamenting the fall of Jerusalem (Zechariah 8:19).

== Jehoiachin pardoned (25:27–30) ==
Shifting the view from the land of Judah and the community in Egypt to the situation in Babylonia, the books of Kings end with a sign of hope. King Jehoiachin who was in prison since his capture in 598 BCE (attested by clay tablets from 592 BCE reporting regular provisions he received from Babylonian administrators) was pardoned and received special honor from the king of Babylon. With this passage, the editors of the books wished to stress that the history of Davidic kingdom did not end with the fate of Zedekiah and his sons (verse 7), but continue in Jehoiachin as a symbol of hope for freedom, a return to the homeland, and the restoration of the kingdom. The book of Ezekiel, written during the exile in Babylon, dated its prophecies according to Jehoiachin's regnal years (Ezekiel 1:2; 29:17; 31:1). Among his sons and grandchildren (1 Chronicles 3:17–19), Zerubbabel emerged as a hopeful political figure after Babylon's decline (Ezra 2:2; Haggai 2:20–23). The conclusion of the book must have been written during the reign of Evil-Merodach (562-560 BCE), as it seems unaware of the Babylonian king's demise after only two years on throne.

=== Verse 27 ===
And it came to pass in the seven and thirtieth year of the captivity of Jehoiachin king of Judah, in the twelfth month, on the seven and twentieth day of the month, that Evilmerodach king of Babylon in the year that he began to reign did lift up the head of Jehoiachin king of Judah out of prison

- "Seven and thirtieth year": This is 26 years after the destruction of Jerusalem. Jehoiachin would have been 55 years old when he was pardoned (cf. 2 Kings 24:8, 12). Clay tablets discovered in the site of ancient Babylon provide information about the provision he received from the Babylonian administrators. According to Thiele's chronology, the date of Jehoiachin's release from prison was 2 April 561 BCE. Book of Jeremiah 52:31 records that Evil-Merodach ordered the release on the 25th day, but the physical release happened on the 27th.

=== Verse 30 ===
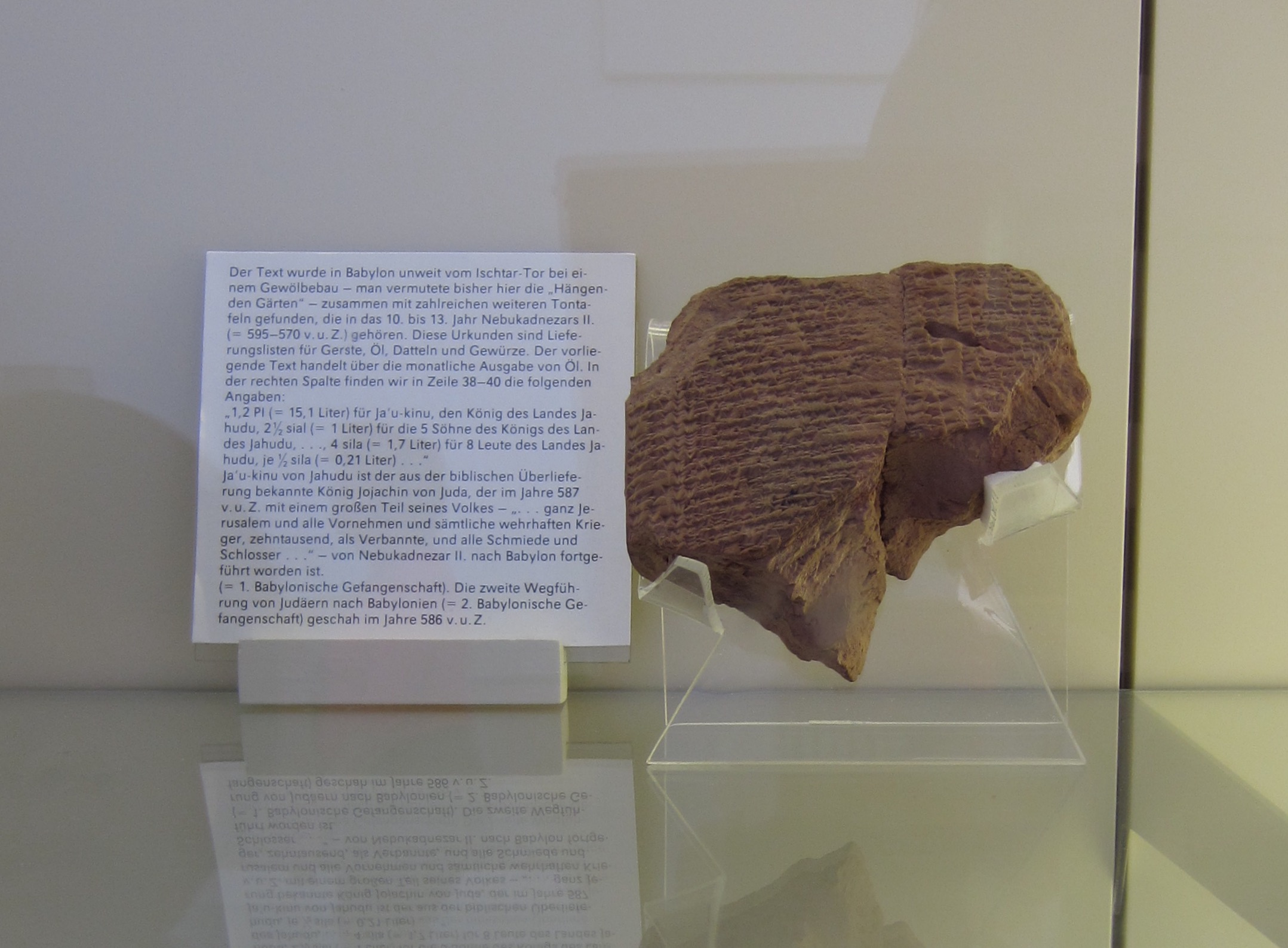
A 6th-century clay tablet listing rations for King Jehoiachin and his sons, captives in Babylon, written in Akkadian language in cuneiform script.

And his allowance was a continual allowance given him of the king, a daily rate for every day, all the days of his life.

In the parallel verse Jeremiah 52:34, there are words "until the day he died" before "all the days of his life".

- "Rate": "ration", "portion", "provision" or "allowance". Tablets from the royal archives of Nebuchadnezzar II king of Babylon (dated 6th century BC) were unearthed in the ruins of Babylon near the Ishtar Gate that contain food rations paid to captives and craftsmen who lived in and around the city, and two of the tablets (now called "Jehoiachin's Rations Tablets") mentions "Ya’u-kīnu, king of the land of Yahudu", who is identified with Jeconiah, king of Judah, along with his five sons listed as royal princes.

== Illustration ==
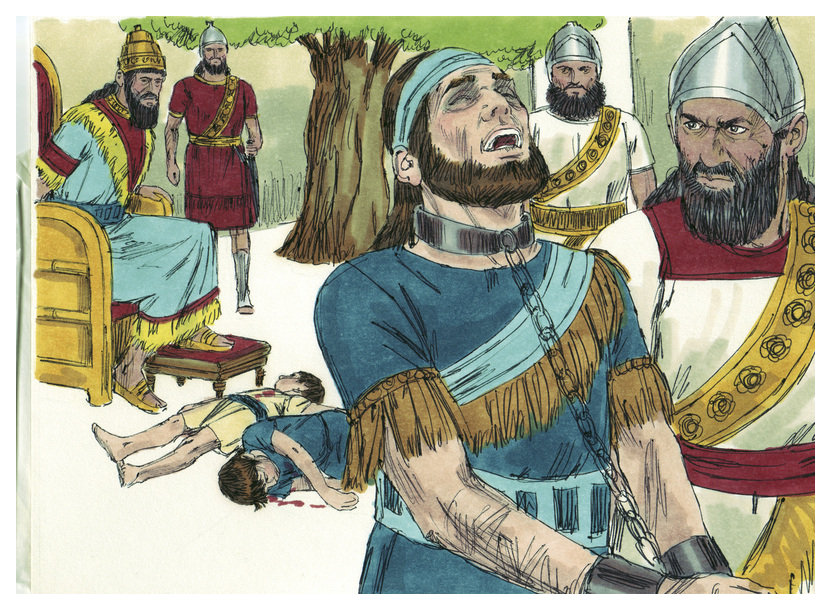
Zedekiah's sons were killed and Zedekiah was made blind before king Nebuchadnezzar

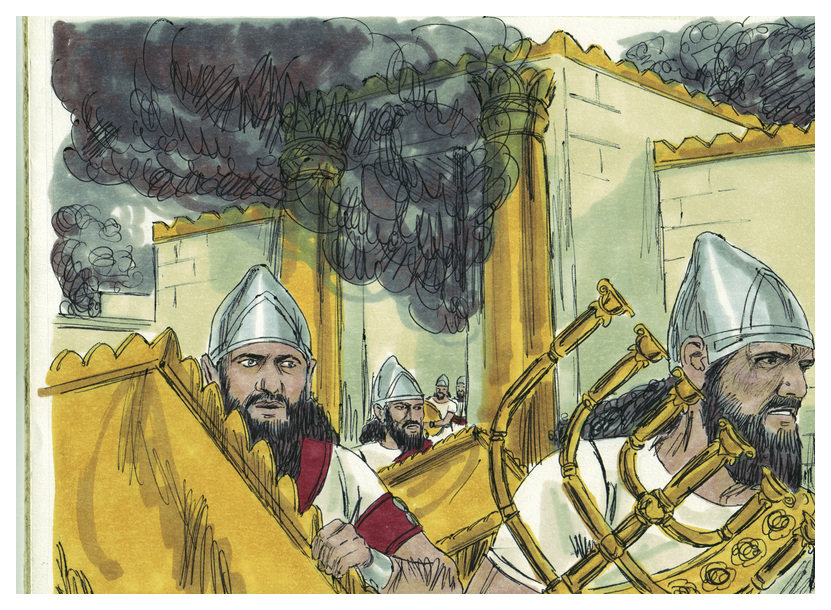
The Babylonians took away the valuable items from the temple and burnt the buildings

== See also ==
- Babylonian Chronicles
- Jerusalem
- Nebuchadnezzar Chronicle
- Related Bible parts: 2 Kings 23, 2 Kings 24, 2 Chronicles 36, Jeremiah 37, Jeremiah 52, Luke 1

== Sources ==
- Cogan, Mordechai; Tadmor, Hayim (1988). II Kings: A New Translation. Anchor Yale Bible Commentaries. Vol. 11. Doubleday. ISBN 9780385023887.
- Collins, John J. (2014). "Chapter 14: 1 Kings 12 – 2 Kings 25". Introduction to the Hebrew Scriptures. Fortress Press. pp. 277–296. ISBN 9781451469233.
- Coogan, Michael David (2007). Coogan, Michael David; Brettler, Marc Zvi; Newsom, Carol Ann; Perkins, Pheme (eds.). The New Oxford Annotated Bible with the Apocryphal/Deuterocanonical Books: New Revised Standard Version, Issue 48 (Augmented 3rd ed.). Oxford University Press. ISBN 9780195288810.
- Dietrich, Walter (2007). "13. 1 and 2 Kings". In Barton, John; Muddiman, John (eds.). The Oxford Bible Commentary (first (paperback) ed.). Oxford University Press. pp. 232–266. ISBN 978-0199277186.
- Fretheim, Terence E (1997). First and Second Kings. Westminster John Knox Press. ISBN 978-0-664-25565-7.
- Halley, Henry H. (1965). Halley's Bible Handbook: an abbreviated Bible commentary (24th (revised) ed.). Zondervan Publishing House. ISBN 0-310-25720-4.
- Huey, F. B. (1993). The New American Commentary - Jeremiah, Lamentations: An Exegetical and Theological Exposition of Holy Scripture, NIV Text. B&H Publishing Group. ISBN 9780805401165.
- Leithart, Peter J. (2006). 1 & 2 Kings. Brazos Theological Commentary on the Bible. Brazos Press. ISBN 978-1587431258.
- McFall, Leslie (1991), "Translation Guide to the Chronological Data in Kings and Chronicles" (PDF), Bibliotheca Sacra, 148: 3–45, archived from the original (PDF) on August 27, 2010
- McKane, William (1993). "Kings, Book of". In Metzger, Bruce M; Coogan, Michael D (eds.). The Oxford Companion to the Bible. Oxford University Press. pp. 409–413. ISBN 978-0195046458.
- Nelson, Richard Donald (1987). First and Second Kings. Westminster John Knox Press. ISBN 978-0-664-22084-6.
- Pritchard, James B (1969). Ancient Near Eastern texts relating to the Old Testament (3 ed.). Princeton University Press. ISBN 9780691035031.
- Sweeney, Marvin (2007). I & II Kings: A Commentary. Westminster John Knox Press. ISBN 978-0-664-22084-6.
- Thiele, Edwin R. (1983). The Mysterious Numbers of the Hebrew Kings (3rd ed.). Grand Rapids, Michigan: Zondervan. ISBN 978-0-310-36010-0.
- Würthwein, Ernst (1995). The Text of the Old Testament. Translated by Rhodes, Erroll F. Grand Rapids, MI: Wm. B. Eerdmans. ISBN 0-8028-0788-7.
