= Assyrian siege of Jerusalem =

Conflict between the Neo-Assyrian Empire and the Kingdom of Judah, c. 701 BC

Coordinates: 31.768319°N 35.21371°E

Siege of Jerusalem
- Part of the Sennacherib's campaign in the Levant
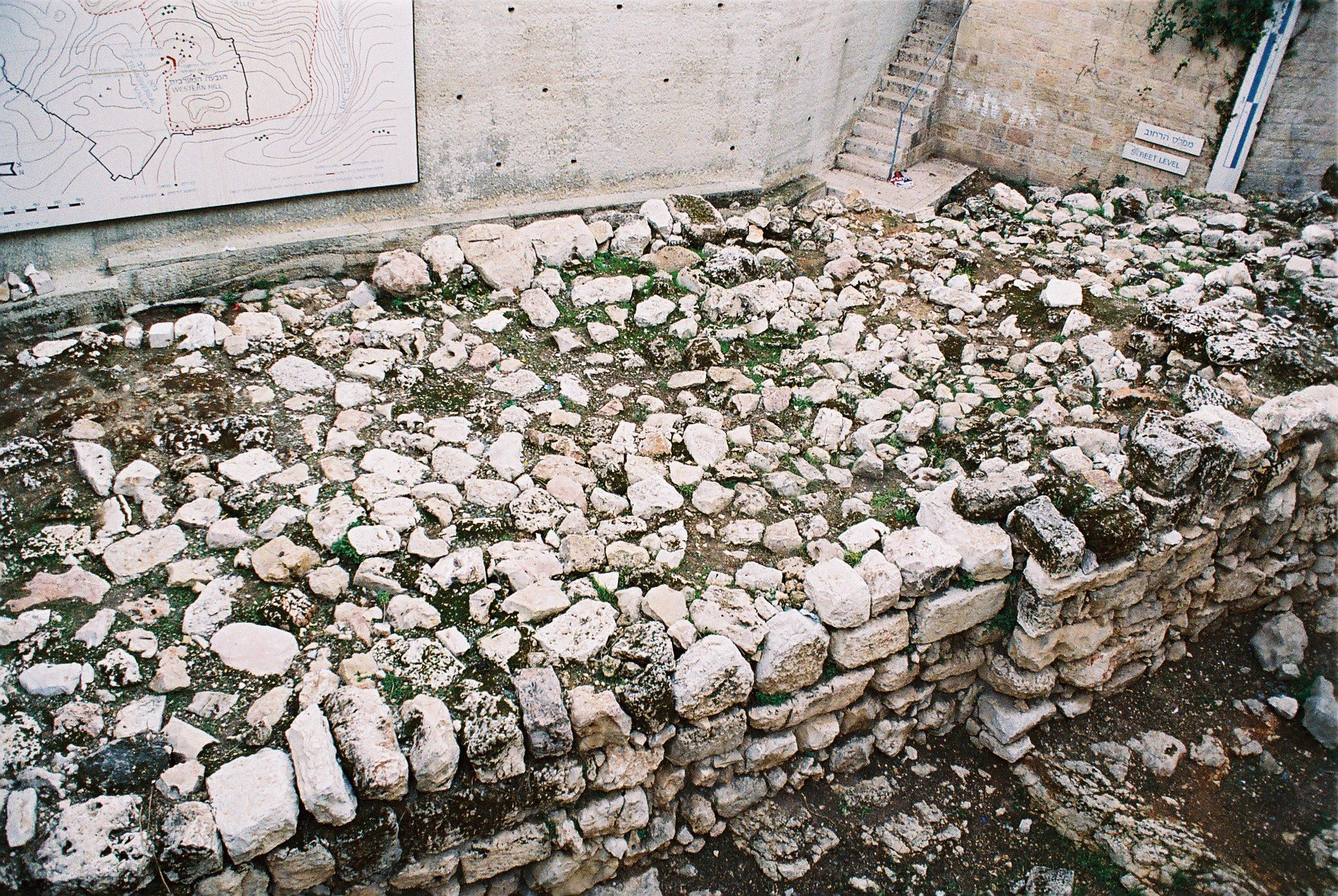
- Hezekiah's Wall
Date	701 BC
Location	Jerusalem, Kingdom of Judah
Result	Inconclusive: Both sides claim victory

Belligerents
Neo-Assyrian Empire	Kingdom of Judah

Commanders and leaders
Sennacherib's Rabshakeh; Sennacherib's Rabsaris; Sennacherib's Tartan	King Hezekiah of Judah; Eliakim ben Hilkiyahu; Yoah ben Asaf; Shebna

Strength
Unknown	Unknown

Casualties and losses
Unknown; Ancient sources: 185,000 killed,imprisoned or injured (according to the Biblical account)	Unknown

The Assyrian siege of Jerusalem (c. 701 BC) was an aborted siege of Jerusalem, then capital of the Kingdom of Judah, carried out by Sennacherib, king of the Neo-Assyrian Empire. The siege concluded Sennacharib's campaign in the Levant, in which he attacked the fortified cities and devastated the countryside of Judah in a campaign of subjugation. Sennacherib besieged Jerusalem, but did not capture it.

Sennacherib's Annals describe how the king trapped Hezekiah of Judah in Jerusalem "like a caged bird" and later returned to Assyria when he received tribute from Judah. In the Hebrew Bible, Hezekiah is described as paying 300 talents of silver and 30 talents of gold to Assyria. The biblical story claims that Sennacherib marched on Jerusalem with his army only to have it struck down near the gates of Jerusalem by an angel, prompting his retreat to Nineveh.

According to biblical archaeological theory, Siloam tunnel and the Broad Wall in Jerusalem were built by Hezekiah in preparation for the impending siege.

== Background ==
In 720 BC, the Assyrian army captured Samaria, the capital of the northern Kingdom of Israel, and carried away many Israelites into captivity. The virtual destruction of Israel left the southern kingdom, Judah, to fend for itself among warring Near-Eastern kingdoms. After the fall of the northern kingdom, the kings of Judah tried to extend their influence and protection to those inhabitants who had not been exiled. They also sought to extend their authority northward into areas previously controlled by the Kingdom of Israel. The latter part of the reigns of King Ahaz and King Hezekiah were periods of stability during which Judah was able to consolidate both politically and economically. Although Judah was a vassal of Assyria during this time and paid an annual tribute to the powerful empire, it was the most important state between Assyria and Egypt.

When Hezekiah became king of Judah, he initiated widespread religious changes, including the breaking of religious idols. He re-captured Philistine-occupied lands in the Negev desert, formed alliances with Ascalon and Egypt, and made a stand against Assyria by refusing to pay tribute. In response, Sennacherib attacked Judah, laying siege to Jerusalem.

== Siege ==
Sources from both sides claimed victory, the Judahites (or biblical authors) in the Tanakh, and Sennacherib in his prism. Sennacherib claimed the siege and capture of many Judaean cities, but only the siege—not capture—of Jerusalem.

=== Hebrew account ===
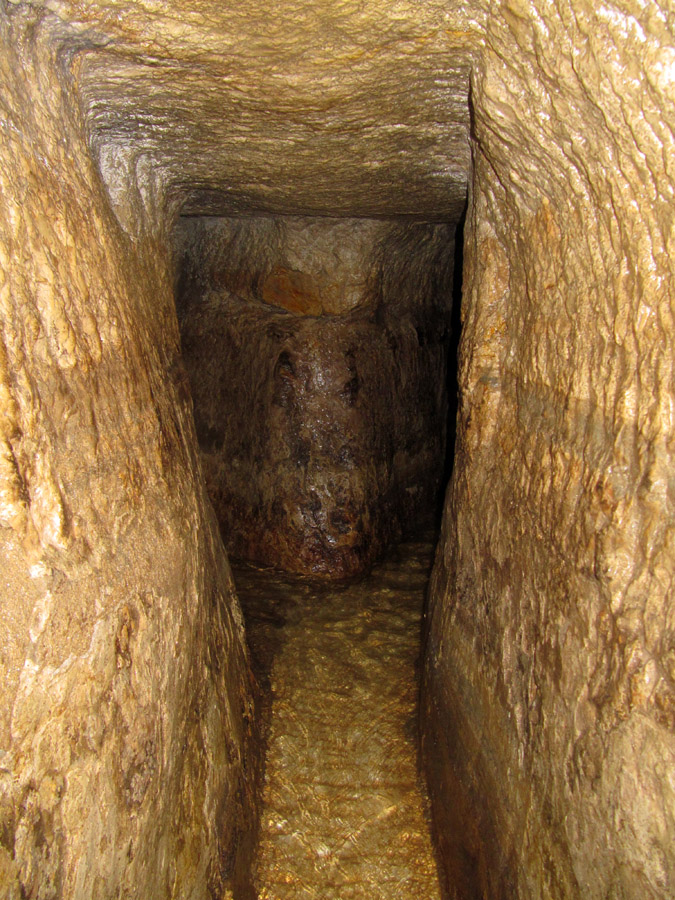
Inside Siloam tunnel, 2010

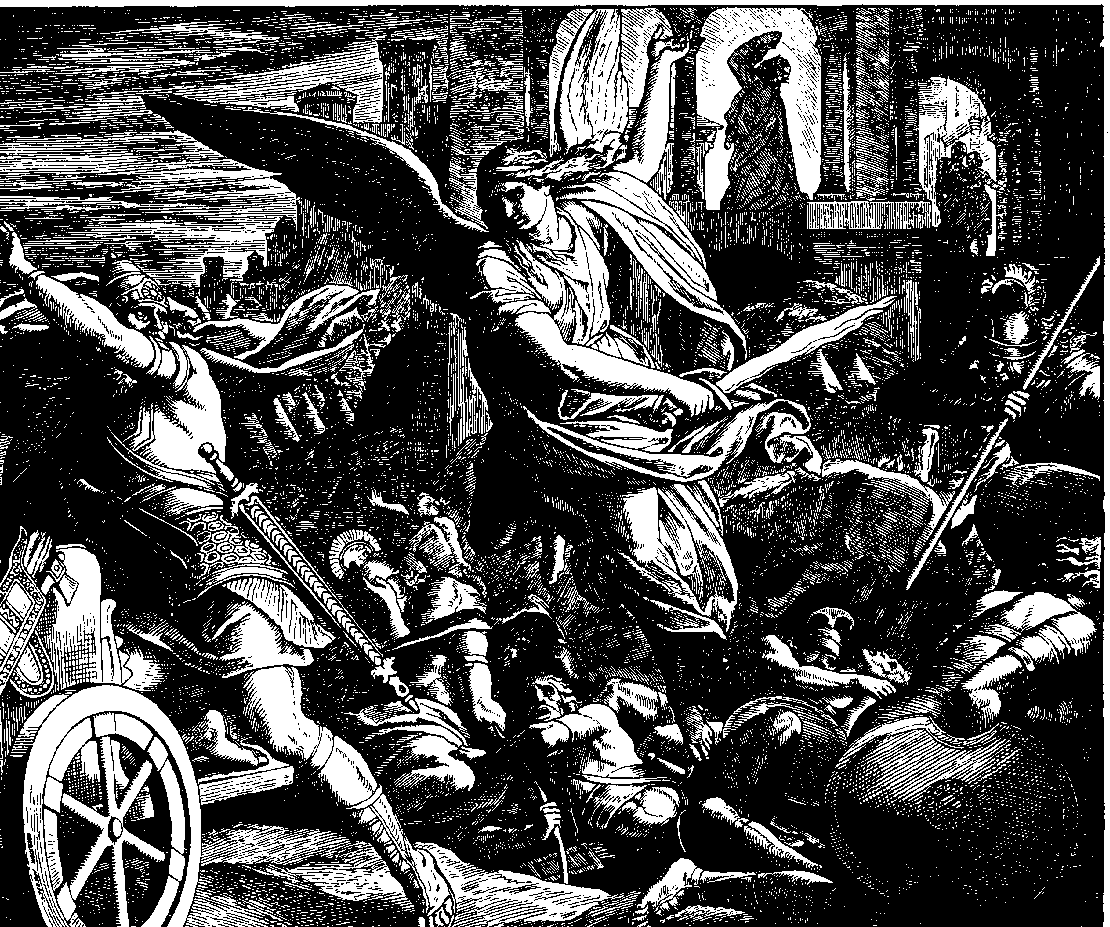
Jerusalem Delivered from Sennacherib, 1860 woodcut by Julius Schnorr von Karolsfeld

The story of the Assyrian siege is told in the biblical books of Isaiah (7th century BC), Second Kings (mid-6th century BC) and Chronicles (c. 350–300 BC). As the Assyrians began their invasion, King Hezekiah began preparations to protect Jerusalem. In an effort to deprive the Assyrians of water, springs outside the city were blocked. Workers then dug a 533-meter tunnel to the Spring of Gihon, providing the city with fresh water. Additional siege preparations included fortification of the existing walls, construction of towers, and the erection of a new reinforcing wall. Hezekiah gathered the citizens in the square and encouraged them by reminding them that the Assyrians possessed only "an arm of flesh", but the Judeans had the protection of Yahweh.

According to 2 Kings 18, while Sennacherib was besieging Lachish, he received a message from Hezekiah offering to pay tribute in exchange for Assyrian withdrawal. According to the Hebrew Bible, Hezekiah paid 300 talents of silver and 30 talents of gold to Assyria—a price so heavy that he was forced to empty the temple and royal treasury of silver and strip the gold from the doorposts of Solomon's Temple. Nevertheless, Sennacherib marched on Jerusalem with a large army. When the Assyrian force arrived, its field commander Rabshakeh brought a message from Sennacherib. In an attempt to demoralize the Judeans, the field commander announced to the people on the city walls that Hezekiah was deceiving them, and that Yahweh could not deliver Jerusalem from the king of Assyria. He listed the gods of other nations defeated by Sennacherib then asked, "Who of all the gods of these countries has been able to save his land from me?"

During the siege, Hezekiah dressed in sackcloth (a sign of mourning), but the prophet Isaiah assured him that the city would be delivered and Sennacherib would fail. According to Isaiah, an angel then killed 185,000 Assyrian troops overnight. Some scholars believe this number has been transcribed incorrectly, with one study suggesting the number was originally 5,180. Another scholar advises that the biblical narrative is marked by legendary embellishments that end with a miracle that saves Jerusalem. Dan'el Kahn says that the large number is an exaggeration, but 5,180 is far too low.

=== Assyrian account ===
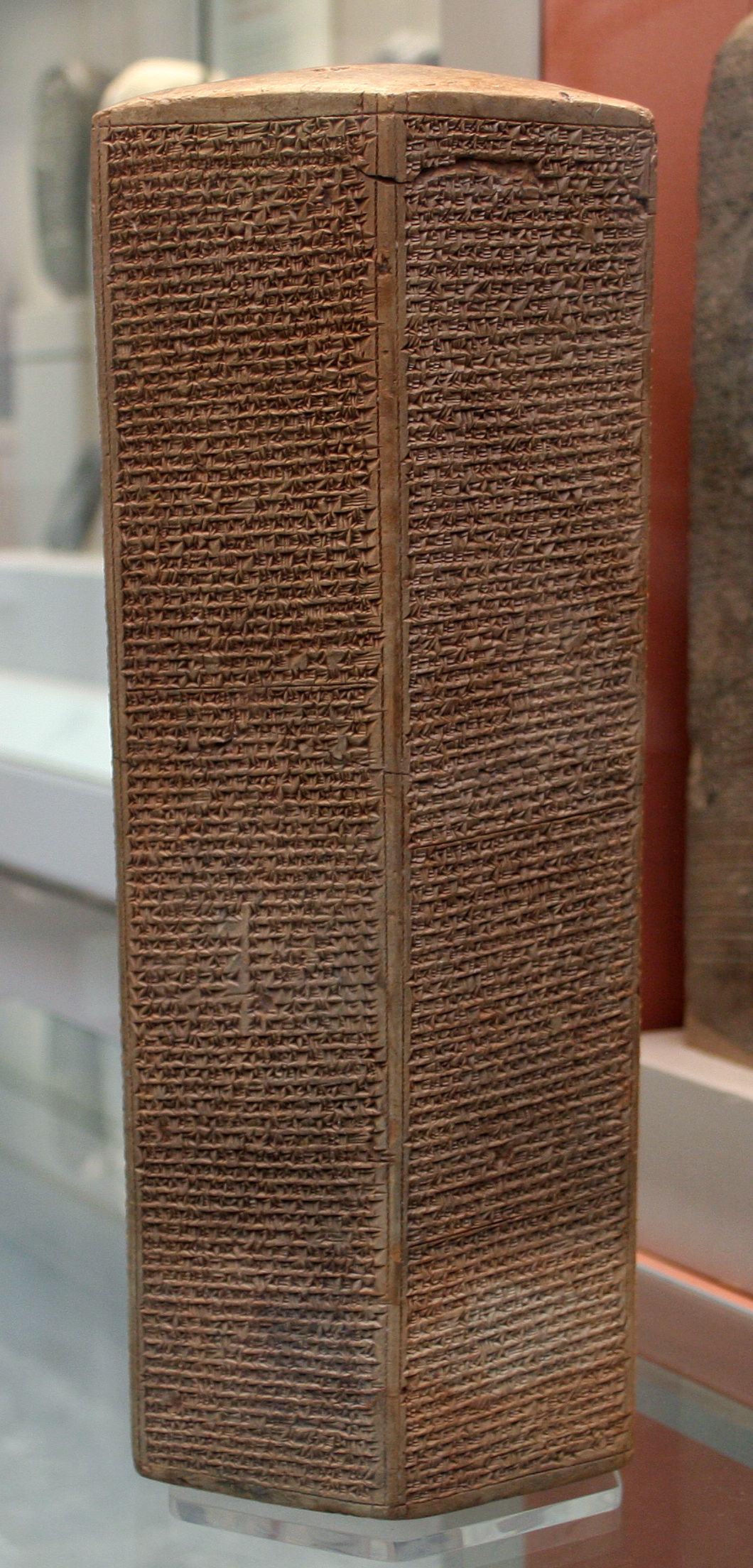
Sennacherib's Prism

Sennacherib's Prism, which details the events of Sennacherib's campaign against Judah, was discovered in the ruins of Nineveh in 1830, and is now stored at the Oriental Institute in Chicago, Illinois. The Prism dates from about 690 BC, and its account is taken from an earlier cuneiform inscription dating to 700 BC. The text of the prism boasts how Sennacherib destroyed 46 of Judah's cities and trapped Hezekiah in Jerusalem "like a caged bird." The text goes on to describe how the "terrifying splendor" of the Assyrian army caused the Arabs and mercenaries reinforcing the city to desert. It adds that the Assyrian king returned to Assyria where he later received a large tribute from Judah. This description varies somewhat from the Jewish version in the Tanakh. The massive Assyrian casualties mentioned in the Tanakh are not mentioned in the Assyrian version.

After he besieged Jerusalem, Sennacherib was able to give the surrounding towns to Assyrian vassal rulers in Ekron, Gaza and Ashdod. His army still existed when he conducted campaigns in 702 BC and from 699 BC until 697 BC, when he undertook several campaigns in the mountains east of Assyria, during one of which he received tribute from the Medes. In 696 BC and 695 BC, he sent expeditions into Anatolia, where several vassals had rebelled following the death of Sargon II. Around 690 BC, he campaigned in the northern Arabian deserts, conquering Dumat al-Jandal, where the queen of the Arabs had taken refuge.

=== Other theories ===
Herodotus wrote that the Assyrian army was overrun by mice when attacking Egypt. Some Biblical scholars take this to an allusion that the Assyrian army suffered the effects of a mouse- or rat-borne disease such as bubonic plague. Even without relying on that explanation, John Bright suggested it was an epidemic of some kind that saved Jerusalem. The Babylonian historian Berossus also wrote that it was a plague that defeated the Assyrian army in the siege, reporting a "pestilential distemper" which claimed the life of 185,000 soldiers on the first night of the siege, consistent with the biblical account.

Henry T. Aubin writes in The Rescue of Jerusalem: The Alliance Between Hebrews and Africans in 701 B.C. that the Assyrian army was routed by an Egyptian army under Kushite (Nubian) command. However, Nazek Matty argues in her archaeological analysis that Aubin's Egyptian hypothesis is unlikely. D.D. Luckenbill said that because there is no mention of a purported Egyptian victory over the Assyrians in the Babylonian Chronicle ("which was not slow to record Assyrian reverses") the defeat of the Egyptians at the hands of the Assyrians in 701 BCE as documented by Sennacherib must be accurate. Paul Evans states that even the Egyptian records do not chronicle a military victory by Egypt against Assyria in 701 BCE. According to a hypothesis that is now supported by the majority of scholars in this area, the discrepancy is due to two sieges, one in 701 BCE resulting in an Assyrian victory against Judah, Egypt, and their allies; the other in 687-686 BCE resulting in a failure for the Assyrians, and that the Bible combined the two sieges into one. Even if there was only one siege in total, it was not as much as a success as Sennacherib's account put out.

The idea that there were two sieges of Jerusalem has been refuted by many Assyriologists in recent years, so that currently the vast majority of scholars hold that there was only one campaign against Judah by Sennacherib. This sole invasion happened in 701 BCE.

== In popular culture ==
An 1813 poem by Lord Byron, The Destruction of Sennacherib, commemorates Sennacherib's campaign in Judea from the Hebrew point of view. Written in anapestic tetrameter, the poem was popular in school recitations.

== Ancient sources ==
- Book of Kings
- Book of Isaiah
- Book of Chronicles
- Sennacherib's Annals
- Antiquities of the Jews, Titus Flavius Josephus

== See also ==
- Siege of Jerusalem (disambiguation), in particular Siege of Jerusalem (597 BC) and Siege of Jerusalem (587 BC)
