= Jeremiah 52 =

Book of Jeremiah, chapter 52

- ← chapter 51 Lamentations 1 →
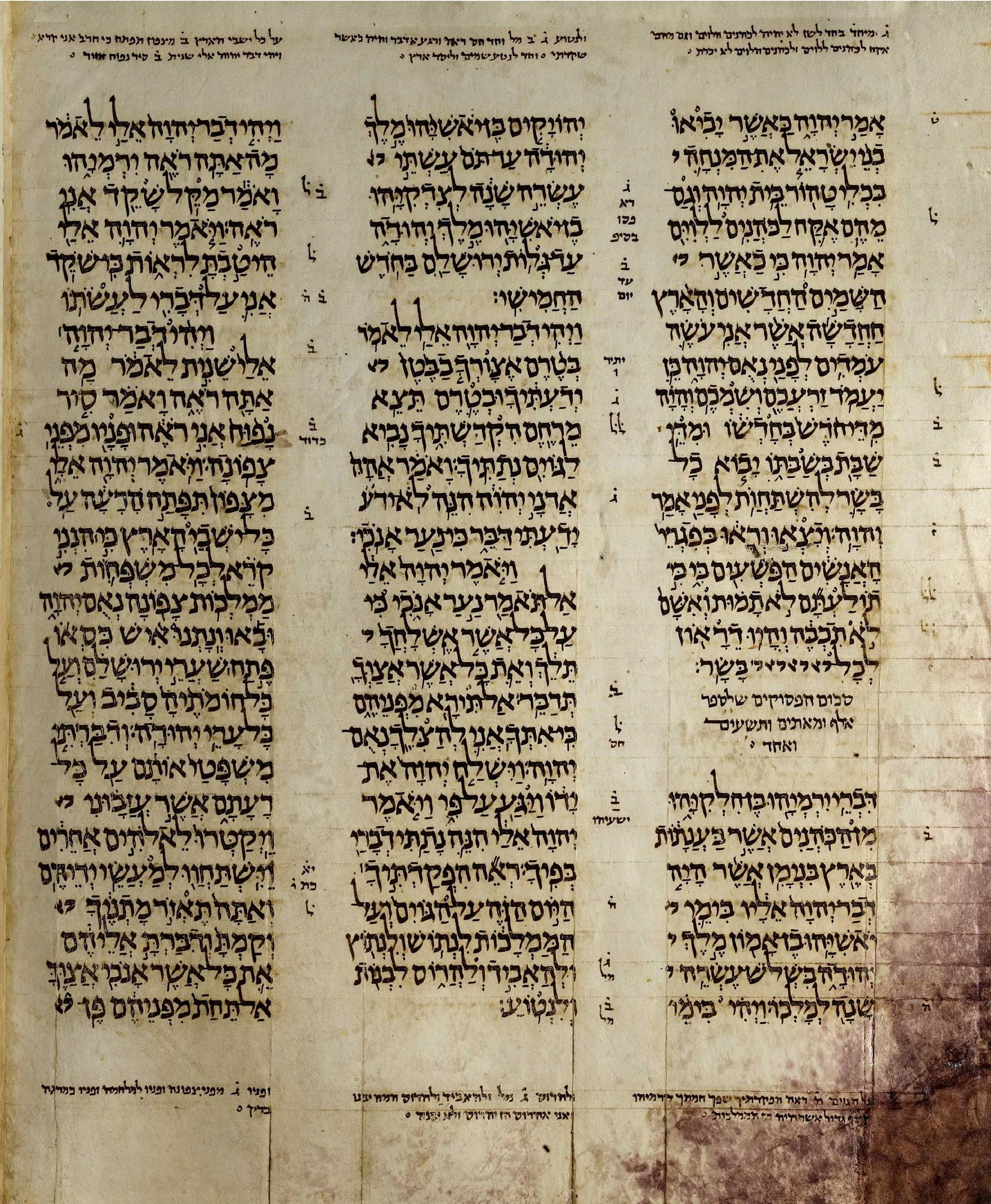
- A high resolution scan of the Aleppo Codex showing the Book of Jeremiah (the sixth book in Nevi'im).
- Book: Book of Jeremiah
- Hebrew Bible part: Nevi'im
- Order in the Hebrew part: 6
- Category: Latter Prophets
- Christian Bible part: Old Testament
- Order in the Christian part: 24

Jeremiah 52 is the fifty-second (and the last) chapter of the Book of Jeremiah in the Hebrew Bible or the Old Testament of the Christian Bible. This book contains prophecies attributed to the prophet Jeremiah, and is one of the Books of the Prophets. This chapter contains a "historical appendix", matching (with some supplementary material) the account in 2 Kings 24:18–25:30 of the end of national life in Judah, and also serving as a vindication of Jeremiah's message.

== Text ==
The original text was written in Hebrew. This chapter is divided into 34 verses.

=== Textual witnesses ===
Some early manuscripts containing the text of this chapter in Hebrew are of the Masoretic Text tradition, which includes the Codex Cairensis (895), the Petersburg Codex of the Prophets (916), Aleppo Codex (10th century), Codex Leningradensis (1008).

There is also a translation into Koine Greek known as the Septuagint (with a different chapter and verse numbering), made in the last few centuries BCE. Extant ancient manuscripts of the Septuagint version include Codex Vaticanus (B; $\mathfrak{G}$^{B}; 4th century), Codex Sinaiticus (S; BHK: $\mathfrak{G}$^{S}; 4th century), Codex Alexandrinus (A; $\mathfrak{G}$^{A}; 5th century) and Codex Marchalianus (Q; $\mathfrak{G}$^{Q}; 6th century). Verses 2–3, 15 and 27c-30 are missing from the Septuagint version.

=== Verse numbering ===
The order of chapters and verses of the Book of Jeremiah in the English Bibles, Masoretic Text (Hebrew), and Vulgate (Latin), in some places differs from that in the Septuagint (LXX, the Greek Bible used in the Eastern Orthodox Church and others) according to Rahlfs or Brenton. The following table is taken with minor adjustments from Brenton's Septuagint, page 971.

The order of Computer Assisted Tools for Septuagint/Scriptural Study (CATSS) based on Rahlfs' Septuaginta (1935) differs in some details from Joseph Ziegler's critical edition (1957) in Göttingen LXX. Swete's Introduction mostly agrees with Rahlfs' edition (=CATSS).

Hebrew, Vulgate, English	Rahlfs' LXX (CATSS)
52:1,4-14,16-27,31-34	52:1,4-14,16-27,31-34
52:2-3,15,28-30	n/a

== Parashot ==
The parashah sections listed here are based on the Aleppo Codex. Jeremiah 52 contains the narrative of "Destruction and Hope". {P}: open parashah; {S}: closed parashah.

{P} 52:1-23 {S} 52:24-27 {S} 52:28-30 {S} 52:31-34 {end of book}

== Structure ==
O'Connor notes six vignettes in this chapter:

- Verses 1-3a: failure of kings (Reign of Zedekiah)
- Verses 3b-11: Zedekiah's failed escape
- Verses 12-23: deportation of people (12–16) and of temple vessels (17–23)
- Verses 24-27: execution of officials
- Verses 28-30: numbers of exiles
- Verses 31-34: Jehoiachin's survival (Restoration of Jehoiachin)

== Reign of Zedekiah (52:1–3) ==
- Cross reference: 2 Kings 24:18–20

Zedekiah reigned as king of Judah 597-587 BCE.

=== Verse 3 ===
For because of the anger of the LORD this happened in Jerusalem and Judah, till He finally cast them out from His presence.
Then Zedekiah rebelled against the king of Babylon.

The contemporary religious situation in Judah is described in Ezekiel 8.

== Siege and fall of Jerusalem (52:4–30) ==
- Cross references: 2 Kings 24:20–25:26; Jeremiah 39:1-10

The siege of Jerusalem lasted from January 587 BCE to August 586 BCE (cf. Jeremiah 39:4–5).

=== Verse 4 ===
Now it came to pass in the ninth year of his reign, in the tenth month, on the tenth day of the month, that Nebuchadnezzar king of Babylon and all his army came against Jerusalem and encamped against it; and they built a siege wall against it all around.

- "Ninth year...tenth month on the tenth day": reckoned to be January 15, 588 BCE, based on the calendar that begins the year in the spring (Nisan = March/April).

=== Verse 6 ===
And in the fourth month, in the ninth day of the month, the famine was sore in the city, so that there was no bread for the people of the land.

- "In the fourth month, in the ninth day": by modern reckoning, on July 18, 586 BC, so the siege against Jerusalem had lasted almost a full eighteen months.

=== Verse 7 ===
Then the city wall was broken through, and all the men of war fled and went out of the city at night by way of the gate between the two walls, which was by the king’s garden, even though the Chaldeans were near the city all around. And they went by way of the plain.

- Cross references: 2 Kings 25:4; Jeremiah 39:4; Ezekiel 12:12
- "The plain": or "Arabah; the Jordan valley."

=== Verse 8 ===
But the army of the Chaldeans pursued after the king, and overtook Zedekiah in the plains of Jericho; and all his army was scattered from him.

- Cross reference: Jeremiah 39:5
- "Plain": from the plural form of the Hebrew word עֲרָבָה, ʿaravah, "rift valley") refers to the sloping plains of the rift valley basin north of the Dead Sea, here specifically in west of the Jordan in the vicinity of Jericho.

=== Verse 11 ===
He also put out the eyes of Zedekiah; and the king of Babylon bound him in bronze fetters, took him to Babylon, and put him in prison till the day of his death.

Cross references: 2 Kings 25:7; Jeremiah 39:7

- "Bronze fetters": or "shackles".
- Huey notes the fulfillment of two prophecies in this verse:
  1. Zedekiah would see the king of Babylon and then be taken to Babylon (the prophecy recorded in Jeremiah 32:4-5; Jeremiah 34:3)
  2. Zedekiah would die in Babylon without being able to see that country (the prophecy recorded in Ezekiel 12:13)

=== Verse 12 ===
Now in the fifth month, on the tenth day of the month (which was the nineteenth year of King Nebuchadnezzar king of Babylon), Nebuzaradan, the captain of the guard, who served the king of Babylon, came to Jerusalem.

- Cross reference: 2 Kings 25:8

The calamity surrounding the fall of Jerusalem (and the burning of the Solomon's Temple) is commemorated in modern times Judaism by an annual fast day "Tisha B'Av".

== Restoration of Jehoiachin (52:31–34) ==
=== Verse 31 ===
Now it came to pass in the thirty-seventh year of the captivity of Jehoiachin king of Judah, in the twelfth month, on the twenty-fifth day of the month, that Evil-Merodach king of Babylon, in the first year of his reign, lifted up the head of Jehoiachin king of Judah and brought him out of prison.

=== Verse 32 ===
And he spoke kindly to him and gave him a more prominent seat than those of the kings who were with him in Babylon.

=== Verse 33 ===
So Jehoiachin changed from his prison garments, and he ate bread regularly before the king all the days of his life.

=== Verse 34 ===
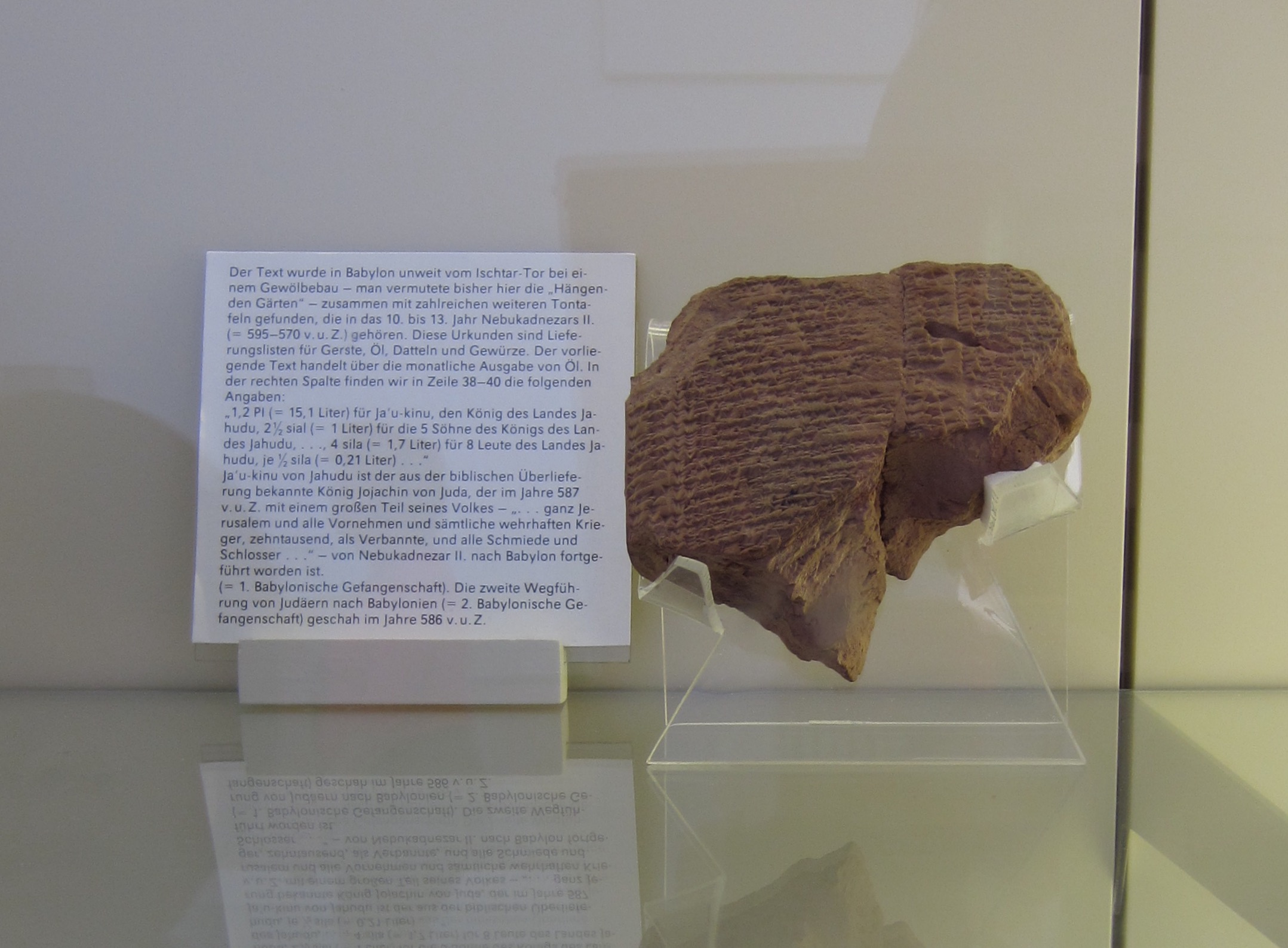
A 6th-century clay tablet listing rations for King Jehoiachin and his sons, captives in Babylon, written in Akkadian language in cuneiform script.

And as for his provisions, there was a regular ration given him by the king of Babylon, a portion for each day until the day of his death, all the days of his life.

- Cross references: 2 Kings 24:12, 24:15–24:16, 25:27–30; 2 Chronicles 36:9–10; Jeremiah 22:24–26, 29:2; Ezekiel 17:12.
- "Ration": Some 6th-century clay tablets, which were excavated from the ruin of Babylon palace near the Ishtar Gate during 1899–1917 by Robert Koldewey, describe the food rations set aside for a royal captive identified with Jehoiachin, king of Judah. These so-called Jehoiachin's Rations Tablets mention "Ya’u-kīnu, king of the land of Yahudu" along with his five sons listed as royal princes.

== See also ==
- Babylon
- Chaldea
- Jehoiachin
- Zedekiah
- Related Bible parts: 2 Kings 24–25; 2 Chronicles 36; Jeremiah 22, 29; Ezekiel 17

== Sources ==
- Coogan, Michael David (2007). Coogan, Michael David; Brettler, Marc Zvi; Newsom, Carol Ann; Perkins, Pheme (eds.). The New Oxford Annotated Bible with the Apocryphal/Deuterocanonical Books: New Revised Standard Version, Issue 48 (Augmented 3rd ed.). Oxford University Press. ISBN 9780195288810.
- Huey, F. B. (1993). The New American Commentary - Jeremiah, Lamentations: An Exegetical and Theological Exposition of Holy Scripture, NIV Text. B&H Publishing Group. ISBN 9780805401165.
- O'Connor, Kathleen M. (2007). "23. Jeremiah". In Barton, John; Muddiman, John (eds.). The Oxford Bible Commentary (first (paperback) ed.). Oxford University Press. pp. 487–533. ISBN 978-0199277186.
- Thompson, J. A. (1980). A Book of Jeremiah. The New International Commentary on the Old Testament (illustrated, revised ed.). Wm. B. Eerdmans Publishing. ISBN 9780802825308.
- Würthwein, Ernst (1995). The Text of the Old Testament. Translated by Rhodes, Erroll F. Grand Rapids, MI: Wm. B. Eerdmans. ISBN 0-8028-0788-7.
