= Jeremiah 39 =

Book of Jeremiah, chapter 39

- ← chapter 38 chapter 40 →
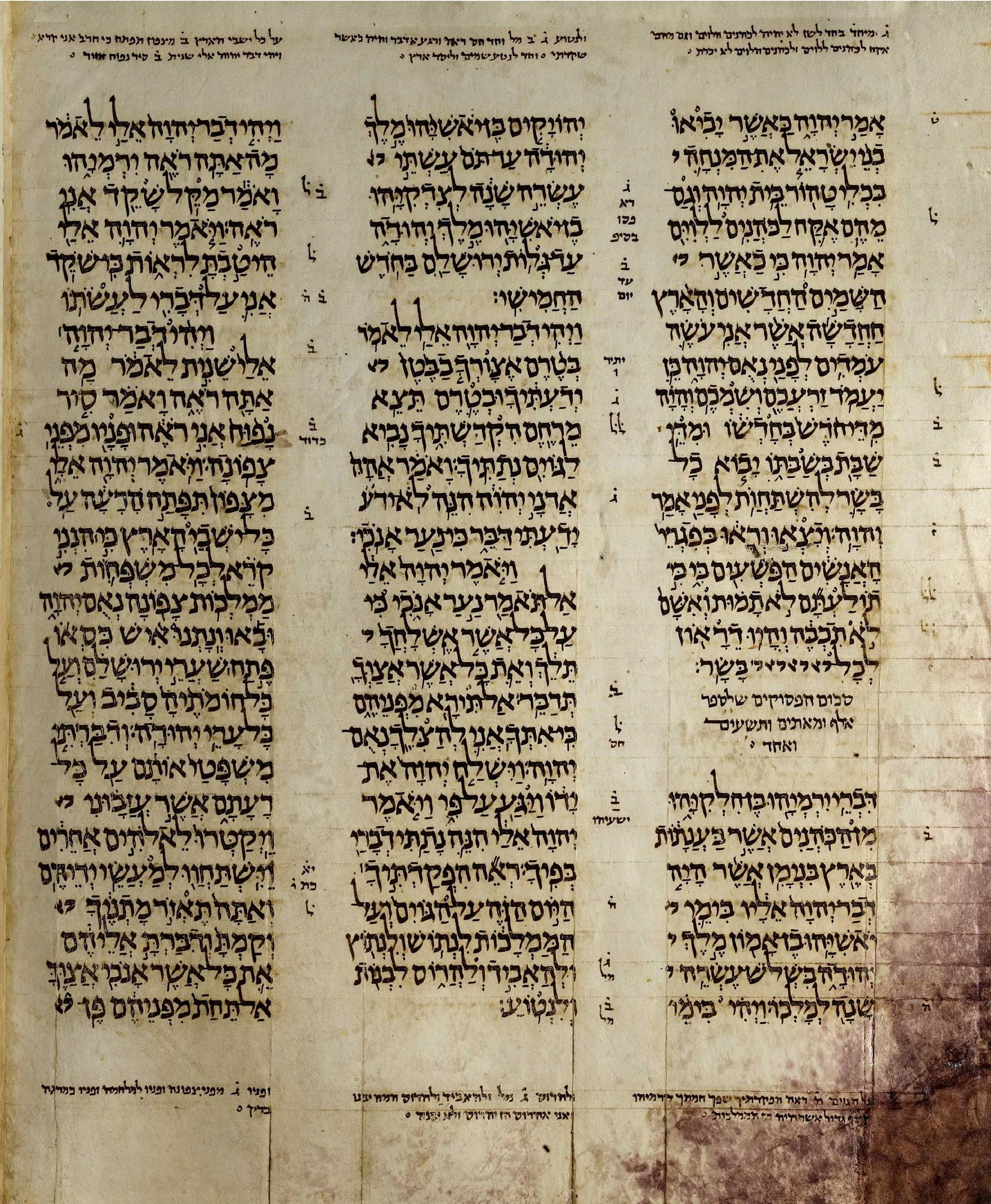
- A high resolution scan of the Aleppo Codex showing the Book of Jeremiah (the sixth book in Nevi'im).
- Book: Book of Jeremiah
- Hebrew Bible part: Nevi'im
- Order in the Hebrew part: 6
- Category: Latter Prophets
- Christian Bible part: Old Testament
- Order in the Christian part: 24

Jeremiah 39 is the thirty-ninth chapter of the Book of Jeremiah in the Hebrew Bible or the Old Testament of the Christian Bible. It is numbered as Jeremiah 46 in the Septuagint. This book contains prophecies attributed to the prophet Jeremiah, and is one of the Books of the Prophets. This chapter is part of a narrative section consisting of chapters 37 to 44. Chapter 39 records the fall of Jerusalem, verses 1–10, and Jeremiah's fate, verses 11–18.

== Text ==
The original text was written in Hebrew. This chapter is divided into 18 verses.

=== Verse numbering ===
The order of chapters and verses of the Book of Jeremiah in the English Bibles, Masoretic Text (Hebrew), and Vulgate (Latin), in some places differs from that in the Septuagint (LXX, the Greek Bible used in the Eastern Orthodox Church and others) according to Rahlfs or Brenton. The following table is taken with minor adjustments from Brenton's Septuagint, page 971.

The order of Computer Assisted Tools for Septuagint/Scriptural Study (CATSS) based on Alfred Rahlfs' Septuaginta (1935), differs in some details from Joseph Ziegler's critical edition (1957) in Göttingen LXX. Swete's Introduction mostly agrees with Rahlfs' edition (=CATSS).

Hebrew, Vulgate, English	Rahlfs' LXX (CATSS)	Brenton's LXX
39:1-3,14-18	46:1-3,14-18	46:1-4,15-18
39:4-13	none	
32:1-44	39:1-44	

=== Textual witnesses ===
Some early manuscripts containing the text of this chapter in Hebrew are of the Masoretic Text tradition, which includes the Codex Cairensis (895), the Petersburg Codex of the Prophets (916), Aleppo Codex (10th century), Codex Leningradensis (1008).

There is also a translation into Koine Greek known as the Septuagint (with a different chapter and verse numbering), made in the last few centuries BCE. Extant ancient manuscripts of the Septuagint version include Codex Vaticanus (B; $\mathfrak{G}$^{B}; 4th century), Codex Sinaiticus (S; BHK: $\mathfrak{G}$^{S}; 4th century), Codex Alexandrinus (A; $\mathfrak{G}$^{A}; 5th century) and Codex Marchalianus (Q; $\mathfrak{G}$^{Q}; 6th century). The Septuagint version does not contain the part what is generally known to be verses 4–13 in Christian Bibles.

=== Parashot ===
The parashah sections listed here are based on the Aleppo Codex. Jeremiah 39 is a part of the "Fifteenth prophecy (Jeremiah 36-39)" in the section of Prophecies interwoven with narratives about the prophet's life (Jeremiah 26-45). {P}: open parashah; {S}: closed parashah.

[{S} 38:28b] 39:1-14 והיה כאשר {S} 39:15-18 {P}

=== Old Testament references ===
- Jeremiah 39:1–10: 2 Kings 25:1–12; Jeremiah 52:4–16

== Analysis ==
Chronologically and thematically this chapter is a continuation of the previous one, describing Babylon's invasion of Jerusalem and its consequences, particularly for Zedekiah (verses 1–10) and Jeremiah (verses 11–18). The narrative places the invasion as background to larger issues (cf. Jeremiah 52:4–16 and 2 Kings 25:1–12), as the focus is more on the Zedekiah's cowardly behavior, escape, and capture (verses 4–5) under the fulfillment of the prophecy, with the ending of the king being blinded, physically as already spiritually. On the other hand, Jeremiah simultaneously obtains release and protection from Nebuzaradan, captain of the guard, at the command of Nebuchadrezzar (verses 11–13) and then under the protection of Gedaliah, the governor appointed by Babylon, and son of Ahikam (cf. Jeremiah 26:24). This signifies the fulfillment of another prophecy that by submitting to Babylon, people could save their lives as the prize of war and returned home (verses 11–14). The episode with Ebed-melech, the Ethiopian rescuer of Jeremiah (verses 15–18), further emphasizes the fulfillment of the divine message (Jeremiah 38:7-13) about his life as a prize of war because he trusted in YHWH (verse 18).

== The Fall of Jerusalem (39:1–10) ==
Verses 1–3 detail the events of the Babylonian invasion to Jerusalem from the ninth to the eleventh year of Zedekiah when finally the city was captured, occupied and destroyed by the Babylonian army. Verses 4–5 focus on Zedekiah's failed effort to escape and the fulfillment of the prophecy that Zedekiah's offspring were killed in front of him before he himself was blinded and taken to captivity. The houses of Jerusalem were burned and people were exiled, except the poor ones who remained and given their land back by Nebuzaradan, the Babylonian captain of the guard (verses 8–10).

=== Verse 1 ===
In the ninth year of Zedekiah king of Judah, in the tenth month, Nebuchadnezzar king of Babylon and all his army came against Jerusalem, and besieged it.

Cross reference: 2 Kings 25:1; Jeremiah 52:1–4; Ezekiel 24:1–2

"The ninth year of Zedekiah king of Judah, in the tenth month" refers to January 587 BCE. 2 Kings 25:1, Jeremiah 52:4 and Ezekiel 24:1 provide the date as "the tenth day of the month".

=== Verse 2 ===
And in the eleventh year of Zedekiah, in the fourth month, the ninth day of the month, the city was broken up.

Cross reference: 2 Kings 25:2–4; Jeremiah 52:5–7

- "The city was broken up" (KJV); "the city was penetrated" (NKJV): An alternative translation would be "... the city wall was breached". "The eleventh year of Zedekiah, in the fourth month" refers to July 586 BCE: the wall of Jerusalem "was broken through" after 18 months of siege, and the city fell after completely devoid of food. Cannibalism became prevalent (Jeremiah 52:4–6; Lamentations 4:10).

=== Verse 3 ===
All the officials of the king of Babylon entered and sat at the Middle Gate: Nergal-sharezer, Samgar, Nebusarsechim the Rab-saris, Nergal-sharezer the Rab-mag, and all the rest of the officials of Babylon’s king.

The Jerusalem Bible merges the last part of Jeremiah 38:28 with verse 3: Now when Jerusalem was captured … all the officers of the King of Babylon marched in...

The medieval Jewish commentator Rashi considered the statement "All the officials of the king of Babylon entered and sat at the Middle Gate" as the fulfillment of the prophecy, "They shall come and each one set his throne at the entrance of the gates of Jerusalem" in Jeremiah 1:15.

Various language versions have rendered the list of names differently:

Hebrew:	נֵרְגַל שַׂרְ-אֶצֶר סַמְגַּר-נְבוּ שַׂר-סְכִים רַב-סָרִיס נֵרְגַל שַׂרְאֶצֶר רַב-מָג
Hebrew (Romanized):	Nêrəḡal Śar’eṣer Samgar Nəḇū-Śarsəḵîm Raḇsārîs Nêrəḡal Śar’eṣer Raḇmāḡ
Greek:	Μαργανασαρ και Σαμαγωθ και Ναβουσαχαρ και Ναβουσαρεις Ναγαργας Νασερραβαμαθ
Vulgate:	NEREGEL SERESER SEMEGAR NABV SARSACHIM RABSARES NEREGEL SERESER REBMAG

- "Nebusarsechim Rab-saris" (Hebrew: נבו שר־סכים רב־סריס): David Vanderhooft reported, "A certain Nabû-šarrūssu-ukīn held the office of rēš šarri under Amel-Marduk in 561 B.C.E." A tablet was unearthed in the ancient city of Sippar in the 1870s and acquired by the British Museum in 1920, but only being discovered by Michael Jursa of University of Vienna in 2000s, to contain both the name and the title Nabu-sharrussu-ukin rab ša-rēši closely matched of this person. As the tablet is dated just eight years before the events described here, Jursa wrote that the rarity of the Babylonian name, the high rank of the rab ša-rēši and the close proximity in time make it almost certain that the person mentioned on the tablet is identical with the biblical figure.
- "Samgar" or "Simmagir"; "Rab-saris"; and "Rab-mag" are "titles of Babylonian officials" according to the New Oxford Annotated Bible.

=== Verse 4 ===
So it was, when Zedekiah the king of Judah and all the men of war saw them, that they fled and went out of the city by night, by way of the king's garden, by the gate between the two walls. And he went out by way of the plain.

- Cross references: 2 Kings 25:4; Jeremiah 52:7; Ezekiel 12:12
- "The king’s garden": mentioned in Nehemiah 3:15 in conjunction with the pool of Siloam and 'the stairs that go down from the City of David', which point to the southern part of the city near the Tyropoeon Valley. The location supports the reference to the "two walls," which were likely 'the walls on the eastern and western hills'.
- "The plain": or "Arabah; the Jordan valley", which is the 'rift valley' (עֲרָבָה, ʿaravah) extending from Galilee along the Jordan River then descending to the Gulf of Aqaba. The king and his men might try to escape across the Jordan river to Moab or Ammon, because from Jeremiah 40:14 and 41:15 it is known that the Ammonites were harboring fugitives from the Babylonians.

=== Verse 5 ===
But the army of the Chaldeans pursued them and overtook Zedekiah in the plains of Jericho. And when they had taken him, they brought him up to Nebuchadnezzar king of Babylon, at Riblah, in the land of Hamath; and he passed sentence on him.

- Cross reference: Jeremiah 52:8
- "Plains": from the plural form of Hebrew word עֲרָבָה, ʿaravah, "rift valley"; here refers to 'the sloping plains of the rift valley basin north of the Dead Sea' west of the Jordan River in the vicinity of the Jericho (cf. Numbers 21:1).
- "Riblah: was a city on the Orontes River in Syria, strategically located at a crossing of the major roads between Egypt and Mesopotamia. About 22 years before (609 BCE), Pharaoh Necho had brought Jehoahaz there, putting him in chains (2 Kings 23:33) prior to taking him captive to Egypt. Now Nebuchadnezzar made it his base camp for his campaigns against the Palestinian states and his seat of judgment on prisoners brought to him there,

=== Verse 7 ===
Moreover he put out Zedekiah’s eyes, and bound him with bronze fetters to carry him off to Babylon.

Cross references: 2 Kings 25:7; Jeremiah 52:11

- Huey notes the fulfillment of two prophecies in this verse:
  1. Zedekiah would see the king of Babylon and then be taken to Babylon (the prophecy recorded in Jeremiah 32:4-5; Jeremiah 34:3)
  2. Zedekiah would die in Babylon without being able to see that country (the prophecy recorded in Ezekiel 12:13)

== Jeremiah and Ebed-melech went free (39:11–18) ==
Jeremiah survived because of his trust to YHWH and together with other people who were left behind by the Babylonians, he could go to his own home (verses 11–14), under the protection of Gedaliah. Ebed-melech, the Ethiopian who had rescued Jeremiah also survived (verses 15–18), because he trusted in YHWH. The many topics of these narratives converge to a single persuasion effort that the exiles should submit to Babylon as the only way of life forward.

=== Verse 13 ===
So Nebuzaradan the captain of the guard sent Nebushasban, Rabsaris, Nergal-Sharezer, Rabmag, and all the king of Babylon’s chief officers;

"Rabsaris"; and "Rabmag" are "titles of Babylonian officials" according to the New Oxford Annotated Bible.

=== Verse 14 ===
then they sent someone to take Jeremiah from the court of the prison, and committed him to Gedaliah the son of Ahikam, the son of Shaphan, that he should take him home. So he dwelt among the people.

According to Jeremiah 40:1 the court of the prison was located in Ramah, from where Jeremiah was released into the protection of Gedaliah (cf. Jeremiah 26:24).

== See also ==
- Babylon
- Chaldean
- Ebed-Melech
- Ethiopia
- Gedaliah the son of Ahikam, the son of Saphan
- Jericho
- Jerusalem
- Judah
- Nebuchadnezzar
- Nebusarsechim
- Nebuzaradan
- Nergal-Sharezer
- Rabmag
- Rabsaris
- Riblah
- Zedekiah
- Related Bible parts: 2 Kings 25, Jeremiah 21, Jeremiah 32, Jeremiah 34, Jeremiah 38, Jeremiah 40, Jeremiah 52, Lamentations 4, Ezekiel 12, Ezekiel 24

== Sources ==
- Coogan, Michael David (2007). Coogan, Michael David; Brettler, Marc Zvi; Newsom, Carol Ann; Perkins, Pheme (eds.). The New Oxford Annotated Bible with the Apocryphal/Deuterocanonical Books: New Revised Standard Version, Issue 48 (Augmented 3rd ed.). Oxford University Press. ISBN 9780195288810.
- Huey, F. B. (1993). The New American Commentary - Jeremiah, Lamentations: An Exegetical and Theological Exposition of Holy Scripture, NIV Text. B&H Publishing Group. ISBN 9780805401165.
- O'Connor, Kathleen M. (2007). "23. Jeremiah". In Barton, John; Muddiman, John (eds.). The Oxford Bible Commentary (first (paperback) ed.). Oxford University Press. pp. 487–533. ISBN 978-0199277186.
- Ryle, Herbert Edward (2009). The Cambridge Bible for Schools and Colleges Paperback. BiblioBazaar. ISBN 9781117708690.
- Würthwein, Ernst (1995). The Text of the Old Testament. Translated by Rhodes, Erroll F. Grand Rapids, MI: Wm. B. Eerdmans. ISBN 0-8028-0788-7.
