= Jeremiah 34 =

Chapter in the Bible

- ← chapter 33 chapter 35 →
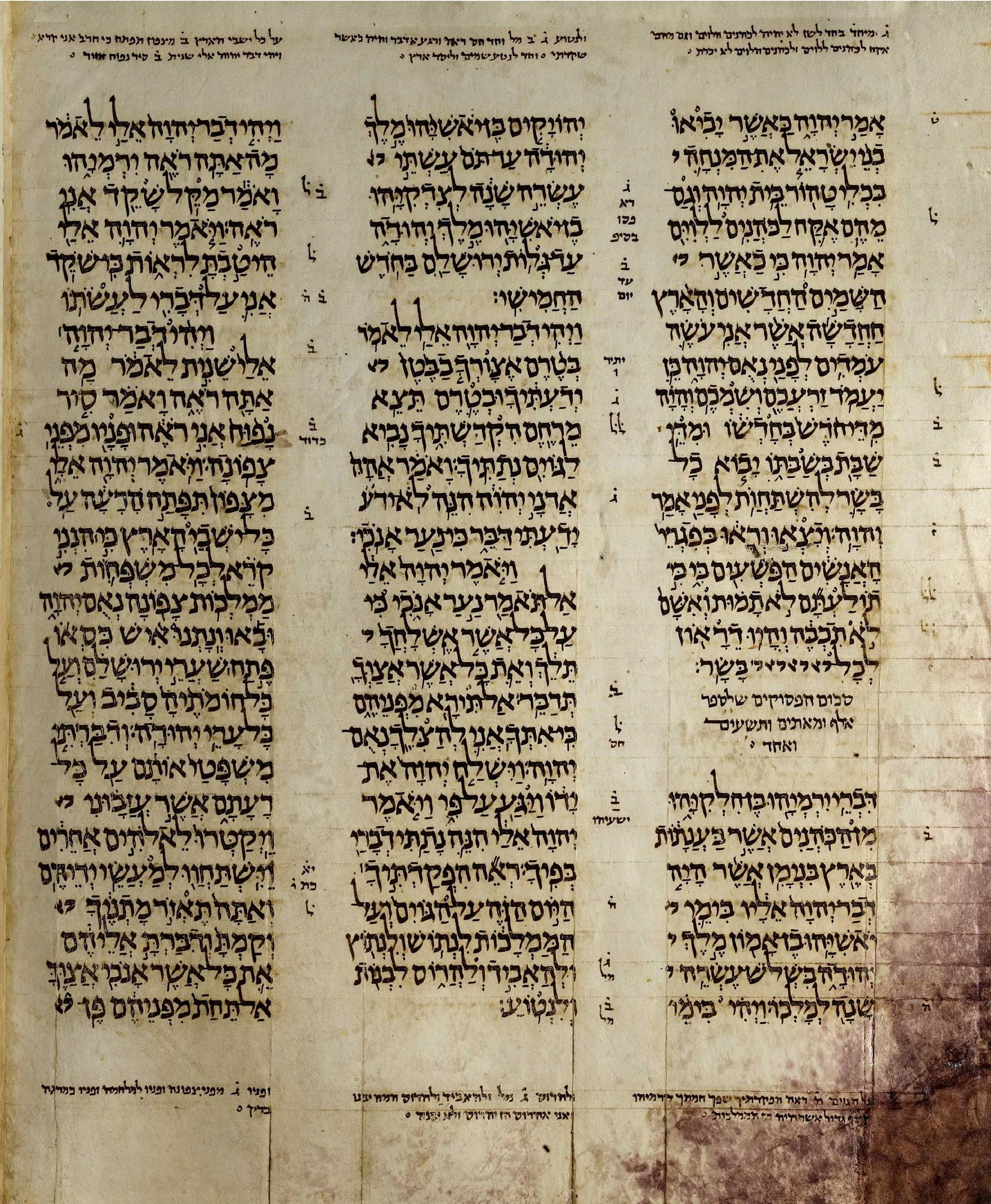
- A high resolution scan of the Aleppo Codex showing the Book of Jeremiah (the sixth book in Nevi'im).
- Book: Book of Jeremiah
- Hebrew Bible part: Nevi'im
- Order in the Hebrew part: 6
- Category: Latter Prophets
- Christian Bible part: Old Testament
- Order in the Christian part: 24

Jeremiah 34 is the thirty-fourth chapter of the Book of Jeremiah in the Hebrew Bible or the Old Testament of the Christian Bible. It is numbered as Jeremiah 41 in the Septuagint. This book contains prophecies attributed to the prophet Jeremiah, and is one of the Books of the Prophets. This chapter anticipates the final moments in the assault of the Babylonian army against Jerusalem, when Jeremiah foretold the destruction of the city and the captivity of King Zedekiah (Jeremiah 34:1-7), and sharply criticized the treacherous dealings of the princes and people with the slaves that provoked the punishment from God (Jeremiah 34:8-22).

== Text ==
The original text of this chapter, as with the rest of the Book of Jeremiah, was written in Hebrew language. Since the division of the Bible into chapters and verses in the late medieval period, this chapter is divided into 22 verses.

=== Textual witnesses ===
Some early manuscripts containing the text of this chapter in Hebrew are of the Masoretic Text tradition, which includes the Codex Cairensis (895), the Petersburg Codex of the Prophets (916), Aleppo Codex (10th century), Codex Leningradensis (1008).

There is also a translation into Koine Greek known as the Septuagint, made in the last few centuries BCE. Extant ancient manuscripts of the Septuagint version include Codex Vaticanus (B; $\mathfrak{G}$^{B}; 4th century), Codex Sinaiticus (S; BHK: $\mathfrak{G}$^{S}; 4th century), Codex Alexandrinus (A; $\mathfrak{G}$^{A}; 5th century) and Codex Marchalianus (Q; $\mathfrak{G}$^{Q}; 6th century).

== Parashot ==
The parashah sections listed here are based on the Aleppo Codex. Jeremiah 34 contains the "Thirteenth prophecy" in the section of Prophecies interwoven with narratives about the prophet's life (26-45). {P}: open parashah; {S}: closed parashah.

{P} 34:1-5 {S} 34:6-7 {P} 34:8-11 {P} 34:12-16 {S} 34:17-22 {P}

== Verse numbering ==
The order of chapters and verses of the Book of Jeremiah in the English Bibles, Masoretic Text (Hebrew), and Vulgate (Latin), in some places differs from that in Septuagint (LXX, the Greek Bible used in the Eastern Orthodox Church and others) according to Rahlfs or Brenton. The following table is taken with minor adjustments from Brenton's Septuagint, page 971.

The order of Computer Assisted Tools for Septuagint/Scriptural Study (CATSS) based on Alfred Rahlfs' Septuaginta (1935), differs in some details from Joseph Ziegler's critical edition (1957) in Göttingen LXX. Swete's Introduction mostly agrees with Rahlfs' edition (=CATSS).

Hebrew, Vulgate, English	Rahlfs' LXX (CATSS)
34:1-22	41:1-22
27:2-6,8-12,14-16,18-20,22	34:1-18

== A prophecy against Zedekiah (34:1–7) ==
=== Verse 3 ===
And you shall not escape from his hand, but shall surely be taken and delivered into his hand; your eyes shall see the eyes of the king of Babylon, he shall speak with you face to face, and you shall go to Babylon.

According to the narrative in the second Book of Kings, Zedekiah tried to flee to the plains of Jericho, but he was captured by the force of Nebuchadnezzar and brought to Riblah, to have a "face to face" meeting with the Babylonian king.

2 Kings 25:7, Jeremiah 39:7 and Jeremiah 52:11 record that Zedekiah's sons were killed before his eyes and then his eyes were put out and he was deported to Babylon.

=== Verse 7 ===
When the king of Babylon’s army fought against Jerusalem and all the cities of Judah that were left, against Lachish and Azekah; for only these fortified cities remained of the cities of Judah.

"Against Lachish, and against Azekah": The two cities, Lachish (45 km or 23 miles southwest of Jerusalem) and Azekah (18 km or 11 miles north-northwest of Lachish; 29 km (18 miles) southwest of Jerusalem). Book of Joshua noted that Lachish was one of the strongest towns of the Amorites in the time of Joshua and, as Azekah, was situated in the Shfela, or lowland district. Rehoboam restored and fortified both cities as a defence against the northern kingdom. Amaziah escaped to Lachish from Jerusalem. Sennacherib conquered the city during his conquest to Egypt, made it his headquarters and commemorated the event in his palace (at Nineveh) in a huge wall relief, now known as the Lachish reliefs. Lachish and Azekah are close to Egyptian border. Letter Number 4 of Lachish letters, found between 1935 and 1938, seems to indicate the fall of Azekah, reported by an official stationed outside the city to his commander in Lachish.

== Freedom for Hebrew slaves (34:8–22) ==
=== Verse 14 ===
"At the end of seven years let every man set free his Hebrew brother, who has been sold to him; and when he has served you six years, you shall let him go free from you." But your fathers did not obey Me nor incline their ear.

- "Has been sold to him": translated from the Hebrew phrase ימכר לך, yim-mā-ḵêr lə-ḵā, which can also be rendered as "sold himself".

The cited statement is the first part of the law written in Deuteronomy 15:12–18.

== See also ==
- Babylon
- Israel
- Jeremiah
- Jerusalem
- Nebuchadnezzar
- Zedekiah
- Related Bible parts: Deuteronomy 15, Joshua 10, Joshua 15, 1 Samuel 17, 2 Kings 18, 2 Kings 25, 2 Chronicles 11, 2 Chronicles 14, 2 Chronicles 25, 2 Chronicles 32, Nehemiah 11, Jeremiah 39, Jeremiah 52

== Bibliography ==
- Huey, F. B. (1993). The New American Commentary - Jeremiah, Lamentations: An Exegetical and Theological Exposition of Holy Scripture, NIV Text. B&H Publishing Group. ISBN 9780805401165.
- Würthwein, Ernst (1995). The Text of the Old Testament. Translated by Rhodes, Erroll F. Grand Rapids, MI: Wm. B. Eerdmans. ISBN 0-8028-0788-7.
