= Ezekiel 13 =

Book of Ezekiel, chapter 13

- ← chapter 12 chapter 14 →
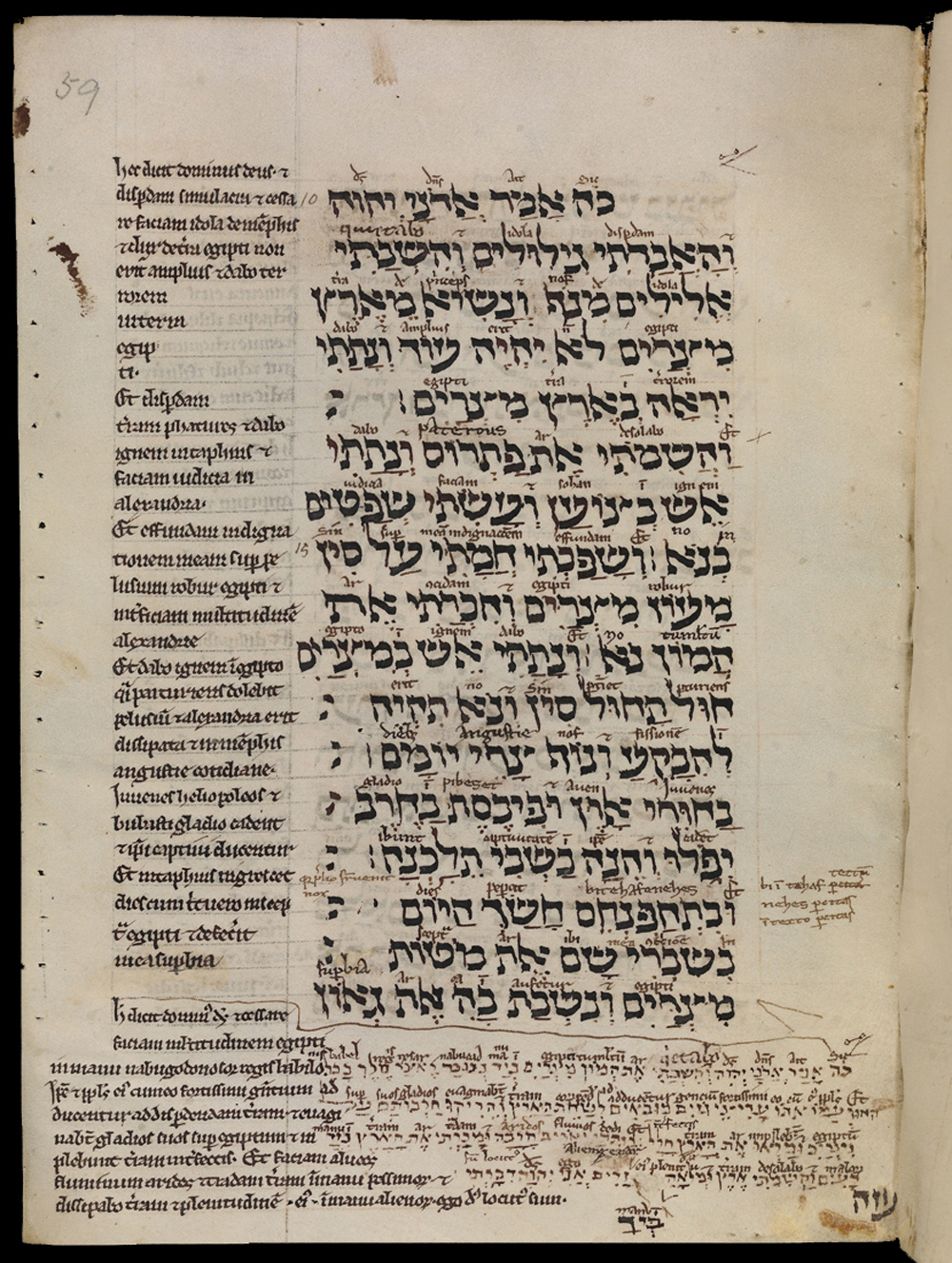
- Book of Ezekiel 30:13–18 in an English manuscript from the early 13th century, MS. Bodl. Or. 62, fol. 59a. A Latin translation appears in the margins with further interlineations above the Hebrew.
- Book: Book of Ezekiel
- Hebrew Bible part: Nevi'im
- Order in the Hebrew part: 7
- Category: Latter Prophets
- Christian Bible part: Old Testament
- Order in the Christian part: 26

Ezekiel 13 is the thirteenth chapter of the Book of Ezekiel in the Hebrew Bible or the Old Testament of the Christian Bible. This book contains the prophecies attributed to the prophet/priest Ezekiel, and is one of the Books of the Prophets. This chapter contains rebukes against "a variety of false prophets", Ezekiel 13:1-16, and false prophetesses, Ezekiel 13:17-23.

== Text ==
The original text of this chapter is written in the Hebrew language. This chapter is divided into 23 verses.

=== Textual witnesses ===
Some early manuscripts containing the text of this chapter in Hebrew are of the Masoretic Text tradition, which includes the Codex Cairensis (895), the Petersburg Codex of the Prophets (916), Aleppo Codex (10th century), Codex Leningradensis (1008).

There is also a translation into Koine Greek known as the Septuagint, made in the last few centuries BC. Extant ancient manuscripts of the Septuagint version include Codex Vaticanus (B; $\mathfrak{G}$^{B}; 4th century), Codex Alexandrinus (A; $\mathfrak{G}$^{A}; 5th century) and Codex Marchalianus (Q; $\mathfrak{G}$^{Q}; 6th century). (Note: Ezekiel is missing from the extant Codex Sinaiticus.)

== Verse 18 ==
King James Version:

And say, Thus saith the Lord God;
Woe to the women that sew pillows to all armholes,

and make kerchiefs upon the head of every stature to hunt souls!

Will ye hunt the souls of my people,

and will ye save the souls alive that come unto you?

- "Kerchief" (Hebrew: מספחות mispahot; Vulgate: cervicalia): a long veil for the head that hangs down covering the whole body (also in Ezekiel 13:21).

== Verse 19 ==
And will ye pollute me among my people for handfuls of barley and for pieces of bread,

to slay the souls that should not die,
and to save the souls alive that should not live,

by your lying to my people that hear your lies?

- "For handfuls of barley and for pieces of bread": the bad actions were done "for a meager fee".

== See also ==
- Divination
- Israel
- Related Bible parts: Jeremiah 28, Jeremiah 29, 1 Corinthians 6, Ephesians 5

== Bibliography ==
- Bromiley, Geoffrey W. (1995). International Standard Bible Encyclopedia: vol. iv, Q-Z. Eerdmans. ISBN 9780802837844.
- Brown, Francis; Briggs, Charles A.; Driver, S. R. (1994). The Brown-Driver-Briggs Hebrew and English Lexicon (reprint ed.). Hendrickson Publishers. ISBN 978-1565632066.
- Clements, Ronald E (1996). Ezekiel. Westminster John Knox Press. ISBN 9780664252724.
- Gesenius, H. W. F. (1979). Gesenius' Hebrew and Chaldee Lexicon to the Old Testament Scriptures: Numerically Coded to Strong's Exhaustive Concordance, with an English Index. Translated by Tregelles, Samuel Prideaux (7th ed.). Baker Book House.
- Joyce, Paul M. (2009). Ezekiel: A Commentary. Continuum. ISBN 9780567483614.
- Würthwein, Ernst (1995). The Text of the Old Testament. Translated by Rhodes, Erroll F. Grand Rapids, MI: Wm. B. Eerdmans. ISBN 0-8028-0788-7.
