= Nebo-Sarsekim Tablet =

Cuneiform inscription

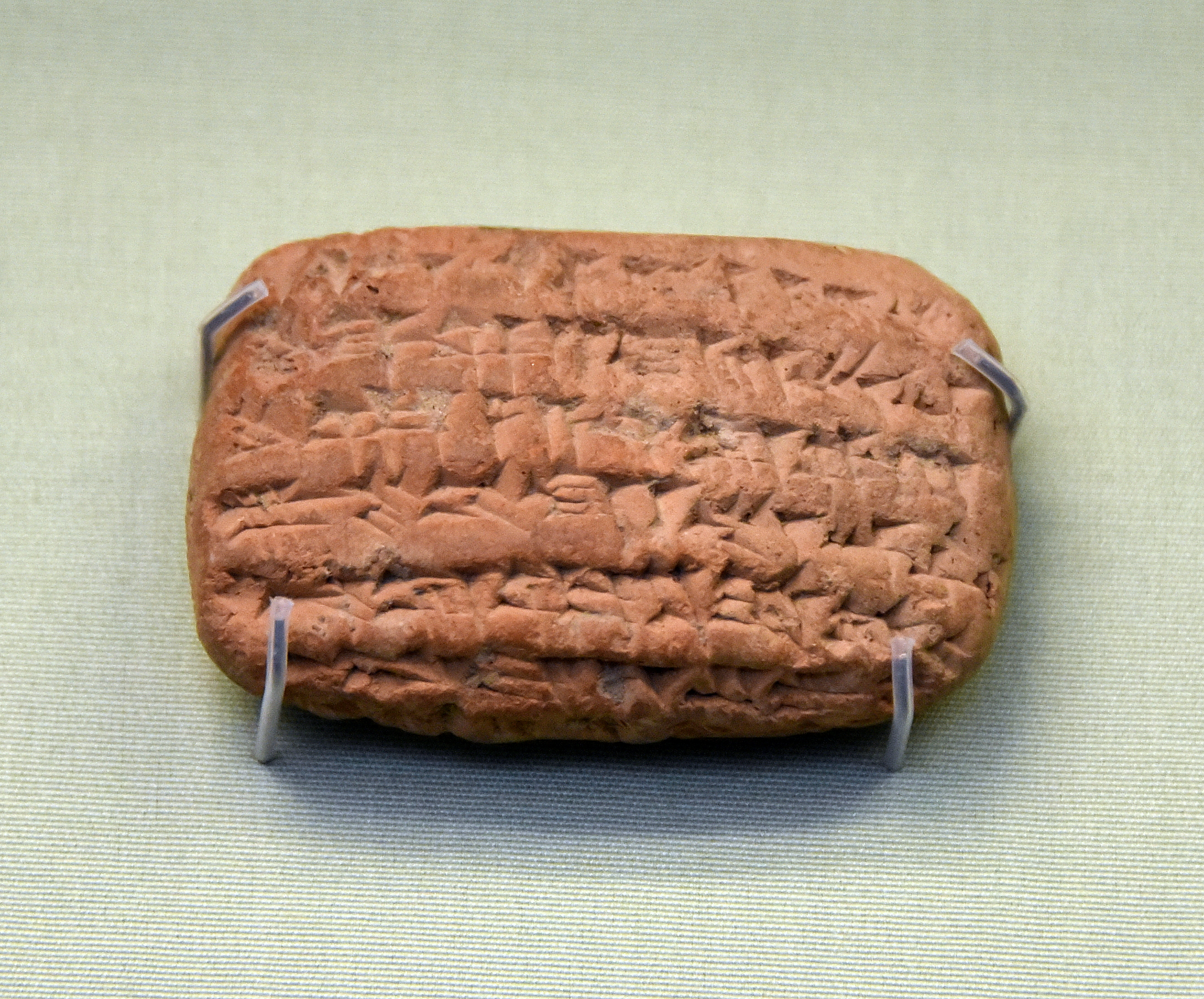
- The chief eunuch, Nabu-sharussu-ukin (Nebuchadnezzar II's right-hand man), "rab sha-reshi", donated gold to the god Marduk temple at Babylon. His name and title occur as Nebo-Sarsekim, "rab-saris", in Hebrew in the Book of Jeremiah. ME 114789; 1920,1213.81.
- Material: Clay
- Width: 5.5 cm
- Created: c. 595 BC
- Discovered: c. 1875; Babylon, Iraq
- Present location: London, England, United Kingdom

The Nebo-Sarsekim Tablet is a clay cuneiform inscription referring to an official at the court of Nebuchadnezzar II, the king of Babylon. It almost certainly refers to an official named in the Biblical Book of Jeremiah.

It is currently in the collection of the British Museum. Dated to circa 595 BC, the tablet was part of an archive from a large sun-worship temple at Sippar.

== Description ==
The tablet is a clay cuneiform inscription (2.13 inches; 5.5 cm) wide and 1.38 inches (3.5 cm) long, with the following content:

| Akkadian (cuneiform) | Akkadian (pronunciation) | translation |
|---|---|---|
| 1½ MA.NA GUṦKIN šá ^{p.d+}AG-LUGAL-su-GIN | 1½ mana ḫurāṣu ša Nabû-šarrussu-ukīn | [Regarding] 1.5 minas of gold of Nabu-sharrussu-ukin, |
| LÚ.GAL.SAG šá ina °ṦU^{II} ^{p}ARAD-^{d}DÙ-tú | rab ša-rēši ša ina qāt Arad-Banītu | the chief eunuch, which via Arad-Banitu |
| LÚ.SAG šá a-na É-sag-gíl | ša-rēši ša ana Esaggil | the eunuch to [the temple] Esangila |
| ú-še-bi-la ^{p}ARAD-^{d}DÙ-tú | ušēbila Arad-Banītu | he sent: Arad-Banitu |
| a-na É-sag-gíl it-ta-din | ana Esaggil ittadin | to Esangila has delivered [it]. |
| ina GUB-zu šá ^{p.d+}EN-ú-sat | ina ušuzzu ša Bēl-usāt | In the presence of Bel-usat, |
| A-šú šá ^{p}A-a LÚ-qur-ZAG^{?} | māršu ša Aplâ ša-qurbūti^{?} | son of Apla, the royal bodyguard, |
| ^{p}na-din A-šú šá ^{p.d}marduk-NUMUN-DÙ | Nādin māršu ša Marduk-zēr-ibni | [and of] Nadin, son of Marduk-zer-ibni. |
gap
| ITI.ZÍZ U_{4}.18.KAM MU.10.KAM | | Month XI, day 18, year 10 [of] |
| ^{d}PA-NÍG.°GUB-ú-ṣu[r] | | Nebuchadnezza[r] |
| LUGAL TIN.TIR^{ki°} | | king of Babylon. |

== Discovery ==
Archaeologists unearthed the tablet in the ancient city of Sippar (about a mile from modern Baghdad) in the 1870s. The British Museum acquired it in 1920, but it had remained in storage unpublished until Michael Jursa (associate professor at the University of Vienna) discovered its relevance to biblical history. He noted that both the name and the title (rab ša-rēši) of the official closely matched the Hebrew text of Jeremiah 39:3. Additionally, the tablet is dated just eight years before the events in Jeremiah. According to Jursa, the rarity of the Babylonian name, the high rank of the rab ša-rēši and the close proximity in time make it almost certain that the person mentioned on the tablet is identical with the biblical figure.

== Bible comparisons ==
According to Jeremiah (39:3 in the Masoretic Text or 46:3 in the Septuagint), an individual by this same name visited Jerusalem during the Babylonian conquest of it. The verse begins by stating that all the Babylonian officials sat authoritatively in the Middle Gate, then names several of them, and concludes by adding that all the other officials were there as well.

Over the years, Bible translators have divided the named individuals in different ways (as seen in the table below), rendering anywhere from two to eight names.

| Hebrew: | נֵרְגַל שַׂרְ-אֶצֶר סַמְגַּר-נְבוּ שַׂר-סְכִים רַב-סָרִיס נֵרְגַל שַׂרְאֶצֶר רַב-מָג |
| Hebrew (Romanized): | Nērəgal Śar-’eṣer Samgar-Nəḇū Śar-səḵīm Raḇ-sārīs Nērəgal Śar-’eṣer Raḇ-māg |
| Greek: | Μαργανασαρ και Σαμαγωθ και Ναβουσαχαρ και Ναβουσαρεις Ναγαργας Νασερραβαμαθ |
| Vulgate: | NEREGEL SERESER SEMEGAR NABV SARSACHIM RABSARES NEREGEL SERESER REBMAG |
| English Standard Version: | Nergal-sar-ezer of Samgar, Nebu-sar-sekim the Rab-saris, Nergal-sar-ezer the Rab-mag |

== Josephus ==
In Book 10 (chapter VIII, paragraph 2; or line 135) of his Antiquities of the Jews, Josephus records the Babylonian officials as:

Ρεγαλσαρος Αρεμαντος Σεμεγαρος Ναβωσαρις Αχαραμψαρις

William Whiston's translation follows the KJV/ASV rendition, albeit reversing two of them:

Nergal Sharezer, Samgar Nebo, Rabsaris, Sarsechim, and Rabmag

The literal translation by Christopher T. Begg and Paul Spilsbury is:

Regalsar, Aremant, Semegar, Nabosaris, and Acarampsaris

== See also ==
- Biblical archaeology
- Cylinder of Nabonidus
- List of artifacts significant to the Bible
