= Ezekiel 12 =

Book of Ezekiel, chapter 12

- ← chapter 11 chapter 13 →
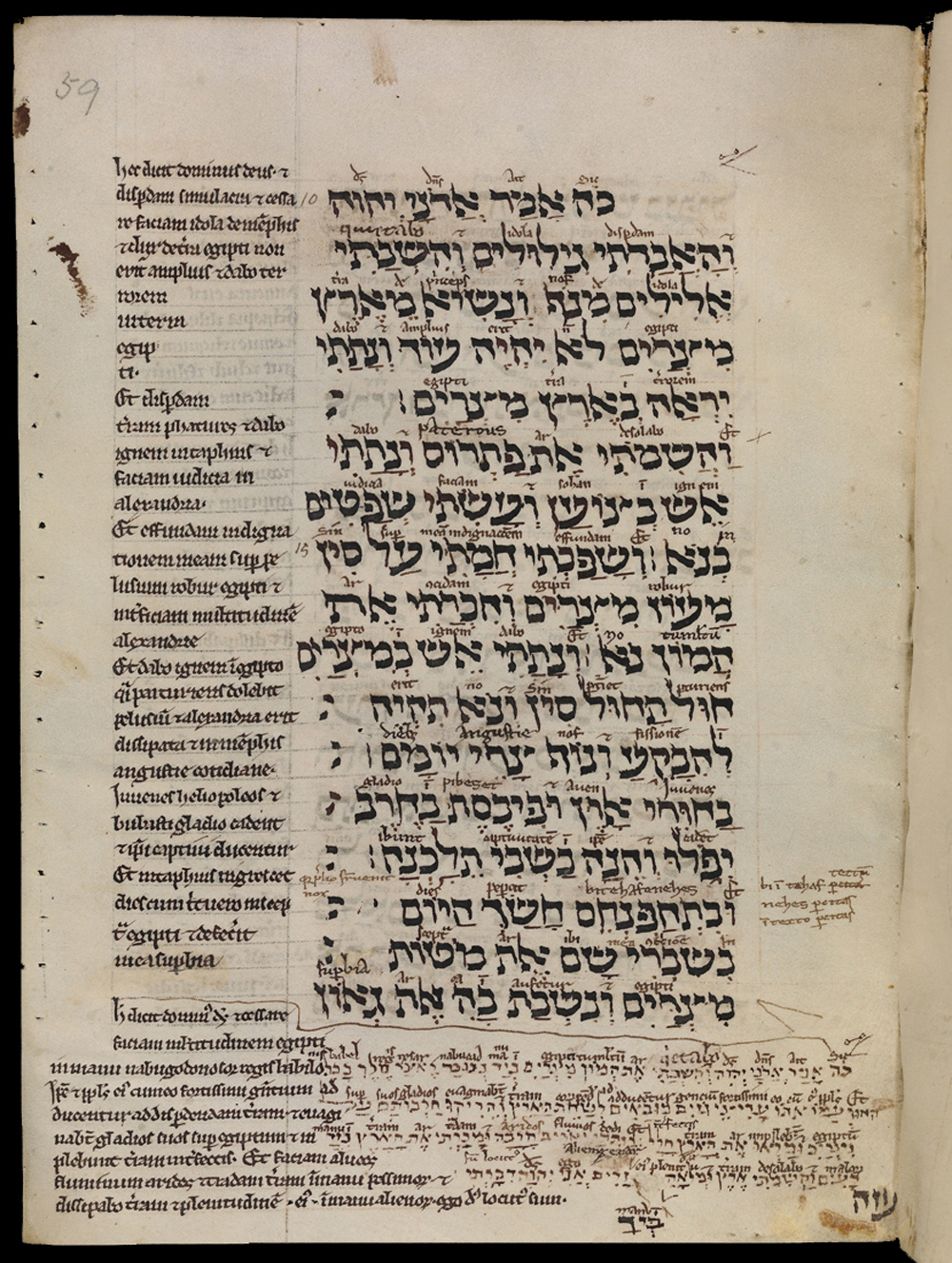
- Book of Ezekiel 30:13–18 in an English manuscript from the early 13th century, MS. Bodl. Or. 62, fol. 59a. A Latin translation appears in the margins with further interlineations above the Hebrew.
- Book: Book of Ezekiel
- Hebrew Bible part: Nevi'im
- Order in the Hebrew part: 7
- Category: Latter Prophets
- Christian Bible part: Old Testament
- Order in the Christian part: 26

Ezekiel 12 is the twelfth chapter of the Book of Ezekiel in the Hebrew Bible or the Old Testament of the Christian Bible. This book contains the prophecies attributed to the prophet/priest Ezekiel, and is one of the Books of the Prophets. In this chapter, Ezekiel undertakes the "mime of the emigrant" and the chapter concludes with condemnation of some "popular proverbs".

== Text ==
The original text was written in the Hebrew language. This chapter is divided into 28 verses.

=== Textual witnesses ===
Some early manuscripts containing the text of this chapter in Hebrew are of the Masoretic Text tradition, which includes the Codex Cairensis (895), the Petersburg Codex of the Prophets (916), Aleppo Codex (10th century), Codex Leningradensis (1008).

There is also a translation into Koine Greek known as the Septuagint, made in the last few centuries BC. Extant ancient manuscripts of the Septuagint version include Codex Vaticanus (B; $\mathfrak{G}$^{B}; 4th century), Codex Alexandrinus (A; $\mathfrak{G}$^{A}; 5th century) and Codex Marchalianus (Q; $\mathfrak{G}$^{Q}; 6th century). (Note: Ezekiel is missing from the extant Codex Sinaiticus.)

== Signs of the coming captivity (12:1–20) ==
=== Verses 1-2 ===
^{1}Now the word of the Lord came to me, saying: ^{2}"Son of man, you dwell in the midst of a rebellious house, which has eyes to see but does not see, and ears to hear but does not hear; for they are a rebellious house."

There is a similar expression in Mark 8 in the New Testament: Having eyes, do you not see? And having ears, do you not hear?

=== Verse 12 ===
And the prince that is among them shall bear upon his shoulder in the twilight, and shall go forth:

they shall dig through the wall to carry out thereby:

he shall cover his face,

that he see not the ground with his eyes.

The fulfillment of this verse is noted in 2 Kings 25, Jeremiah 39 and Jeremiah 52 as follows:

2 Kings 25:4: And the city was broken up, and all the men of war fled by night by the way of the gate between two walls, which is by the king's garden: (now the Chaldees were against the city round about:) and the king went the way toward the plain.

The plain: "or Arabah, that is, the Jordan Valley" in NKJV notes.

Jeremiah 39:4 (=Jeremiah 52:7): And it came to pass, that when Zedekiah the king of Judah saw them, and all the men of war, then they fled, and went forth out of the city by night, by the way of the king's garden, by the gate betwixt the two walls: and he went out the way of the plain.

The plain: "or Arabah, that is, the Jordan Valley" in NKJV notes.

=== Verse 13 ===
My net also will I spread upon him,

and he shall be taken in my snare:

and I will bring him to Babylon to the land of the Chaldeans;

yet shall he not see it, though he shall die there.

- "Snare" (Hebrew: מְצוּדָה mə-tsū-ḏāh): a kind of "trap; hunting net," figurately as someone's "judgment."

The fulfillment of this verse is noted in 2 Kings 25, Jeremiah 39 and Jeremiah 52, which describe the capture of King Zedekiah and his eventual death. Zedekiah's eyes were put out and so he would die in Babylon without being able to see that country:

2 Kings 25:5–7: And the army of the Chaldees pursued after the king, and overtook him in the plains of Jericho: and all his army were scattered from him. So they took the king, and brought him up to the king of Babylon to Riblah; and they gave judgment upon him. And they slew the sons of Zedekiah before his eyes, and put out the eyes of Zedekiah, and bound him with fetters of brass, and carried him to Babylon.
Jeremiah 52:8–11 (=Jeremiah 39:5–7): But the army of the Chaldeans pursued after the king, and overtook Zedekiah in the plains of Jericho; and all his army was scattered from him. Then they took the king, and carried him up unto the king of Babylon to Riblah in the land of Hamath; where he gave judgment upon him. And the king of Babylon slew the sons of Zedekiah before his eyes: he slew also all the princes of Judah in Riblah. Then he put out the eyes of Zedekiah; and the king of Babylon bound him in chains, and carried him to Babylon, and put him in prison till the day of his death.

== The presumptuous proverb (12:21–28) ==
=== Verse 22 ===
"Son of man, what is this proverb that you people have about the land of Israel, which says, ‘The days are prolonged, and every vision fails’?"

Methodist commentator Joseph Benson describes this saying as "the words of scoffers, who turned the grace of God into wantonness, and took encouragement from his patience and long-suffering, to despise his threatenings, as if they would never be fulfilled".

== See also ==
- Babylon
- Chaldeans
- Israel
- Jerusalem
- Nebuchadnezzar II
- Zedekiah
- Related Bible parts: 2 Kings 25, Jeremiah 39, Jeremiah 52

== Bibliography ==
- Bromiley, Geoffrey W. (1995). International Standard Bible Encyclopedia: vol. iv, Q-Z. Eerdmans. ISBN 9780802837844.
- Brown, Francis; Briggs, Charles A.; Driver, S. R. (1994). The Brown-Driver-Briggs Hebrew and English Lexicon (reprint ed.). Hendrickson Publishers. ISBN 978-1565632066.
- Clements, Ronald E (1996). Ezekiel. Westminster John Knox Press. ISBN 9780664252724.
- Gesenius, H. W. F. (1979). Gesenius' Hebrew and Chaldee Lexicon to the Old Testament Scriptures: Numerically Coded to Strong's Exhaustive Concordance, with an English Index. Translated by Tregelles, Samuel Prideaux (7th ed.). Baker Book House.
- Joyce, Paul M. (2009). Ezekiel: A Commentary. Continuum. ISBN 9780567483614.
- The Nelson Study Bible. Thomas Nelson, Inc. 1997. ISBN 9780840715999.
- Würthwein, Ernst (1995). The Text of the Old Testament. Translated by Rhodes, Erroll F. Grand Rapids, MI: Wm. B. Eerdmans. ISBN 0-8028-0788-7.
