= Nebuchadnezzar II's Prism =

Artifact from the Neo-Babylonian Empire

Nebuchadnezzar II's Prism, also known as the Hofkalender, EŞ 7834, The Court of Nebuchadnezzar, the Unger Prism, Nebuchadnezzar's Court Calendar, the Phillipps Cylinder, Nbk Zyl III,4, C34, and Nr. 9, is an artifact from the Neo-Babylonian Empire. The text is similar to, but different from, the Nebuchadnezzar cylinder C34, also known as the Middle Hill cylinder.

== Date and context ==
The text states that it was written in Nebuchadnezzar's seventh year, or 598–597 BCE. It was written on or after Nebuchadnezzar's 7th year

Da Riva dates the text to 598 BCE at the latest. Shea dates the text to 593 BCE or shortly thereafter, certainly before 586 BCE. He suggests the context for the passage is a recent revolt against Nebuchadrezzar in December 595 – January 594 BCE, with the beginning of the inscription as a gesture of gratitude to the gods for helping to suppress the revolt. The text is a review of the personnel of the Babylonian bureaucracy in order to ensure all remain loyal to Nebuchadnezzar.

Critchlow dates the artifact to 570 BCE during the reign of Amel-Marduk.

== Contents ==
The first half of the text is devoted to Nebuchadnezzar's relationship with the gods, while the last half contains a list of more than fifty officials appointed by Nebuchadnezzar. The first segment describes Nebuchadnezzar's service to the gods by rebuilding their temples and supplying them with offerings. The second segment credits Marduk with providing various lands to Nebuchadnezzar and how the associated tribute from those lands had made Nebuchadnezzar wealthy. The third segment contains Nebuchadnezzar's prayer to Marduk asking that Marduk might continue to extend his rule over the lands.

The list includes a number of figures described in the Hebrew Bible, including imperial chancellor Nebuzaradan who is also known from 2 Kings 25:8-11 and Jeremiah 39:13. It also mentions Neriglissar, Hananiah, Meshach, and Abednego.

The Unger Prism contains a list of kings who were prisoners of Babylon during the reign of Amel-Marduk, including the kings of Tyre, Gaza, Sidon, Arvad, and Arpad.

The Unger Prism has been understood to confirm the historicity of the Biblical account of King Jeconiah of Judah's superior treatment to other kings held captive (2 Kings 25:28) and his release from Babylon.

The arrangement of Babylonian regions in the Unger Prism corresponds to those mentioned in Ezekiel 23.

It describes the building of a royal palace in Babylon and includes a list of Babylonian court officials

The Unger Prism is the only extant source which describes the upper administrative structure of the Babylonian state.

== Versions ==
A version of text was found at Babylon by Harford Jones-Brydges. This version was engraved on a short column of black basalt, with 619 lines of text divided into ten columns. The column was part of the India House Collection. That is the version published in Rodwell (1901).

Another version of the text was found in the Western Annex Building of the South Palace in Babylon on a clay prism. This prism originally had eight sides. Five columns of text on five sides were published in Unger (1970), and an additional side was published in Berger (1973). The base of the prism is 23.6 cm in diameter and has a maximum preserved height of 23.4 cm. Da Riva believes the original was 45–50 cm tall and thus that about 2/3 of the original text is missing. The prism is at the Istanbul Archaeology Museums.

== Published editions ==
- Johnson, Rossiter, ed. (1901). "The East India House inscription of Nebuchadrezzar II, king of Babylon (601-565 B.C.)". Assyrian and Babylonian literature: Selected translations. Translated by Gray, Clifton Daggett. New York: D. Appleton & Co. pp. 134–143.
- "Inscription of Nebuchadnezzar". Babylonian and Assyrian literature: Comprising the epic of Izdubar, hymns, tablets, and cuneiform inscriptions. The World's Great Classics. Translated by Rodwell, J. M. New York: The Colonial Press. 1901. pp. 250ff. (HTML available from Bruce J. Butterfield and from Project Gutenberg)
- Da Riva, Rocio (1 December 2012). "Nebuchadnezzar II's Prism (EŞ 7834): A New Edition". Zeitschrift für Assyriologie und vorderasiatische Archäologie [Journal of Assyriology and Near Eastern Archeology]. 103 (2). Walter de Gruyter GmbH: 196–229. doi:10.1515/za-2013-0013. ISSN 0084-5299. S2CID 199576117.
