= Rab-Mag =

Rab-Mag (from magh Persian, Medes, and Babylonian designation for wise men, and Hebrew רחב meaning broad) was chief of the Magi and one of the Babylonian princes present at the destruction of Jerusalem.

== See also ==
- Rabshakeh
- Rabmag
