= Dayyan-Assur =

Dayyan-Assur was commander-in-chief, or Tartan (turtānu), of the Assyrian army during the reign of Shalmaneser III (859 - 824 BC).

According to the Black Obelisk, he personally led some of the military campaigns outside Assyria, which is rather unusual for a turtanu'. He was involved in the strife for the succession of the aged king, leading to the rulership of Shamshi-Adad V.
