= Robert Koldewey =

German archaeologist

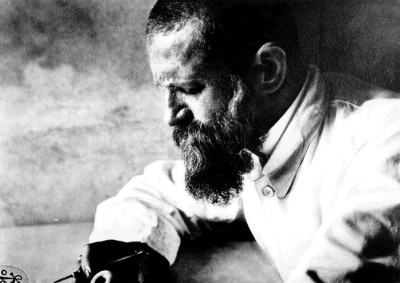
- Robert Koldewey
- Born: Robert Johann Koldewey; 10 September 1855; Blankenburg am Harz, Duchy of Brunswick, German Confederation
- Died: 4 February 1925 (aged 69); Berlin, Germany
- Known for: Babylonian Excavations
- Scientific career
- Fields: archaeologist,

Robert Johann Koldewey (10 September 1855 – 4 February 1925) was a German archaeologist, famous for his in-depth excavation of the ancient city of Babylon in modern-day Iraq. He was born in Blankenburg am Harz in Germany, the duchy of Brunswick, and died in Berlin at the age of 69.

His digs at Babylon revealed the foundations of the ziggurat Marduk, and the Ishtar Gate; he also developed several modern archaeological techniques including a method to identify and excavate mud brick architecture. This technique was particularly useful in his excavation of the Hanging Gardens of Babylon (1899–1917) which were built ca. 580 BC using mainly unfired mudbricks.

A practicing archaeologist for most of his life, he participated in and led many excavations in Asia Minor, Greece, and Italy. After he died, the Koldewey Society was established to record and mark his architectural service.

== Early life ==
After attending a gymnasium in Braunschweig, Koldewey moved with his family to Altona in 1869 where he attended the Christianeum, achieving his abitur in 1875.

Koldewey was a self-trained archaeological historian of the classical area. Although he studied architecture and art history in Berlin and Vienna, he left both those universities without an advanced degree. In 1882 he was signed on as a participant to the excavation of ancient Assus in Turkey, where Koldewey learned several excavation methods and how best to draw ancient remains.

== Archaeology ==
Francis H. Bacon (an American affiliated with the Archaeological Institute of America) introduced Koldewey to archaeology at the excavation of Assos in 1882–1883. Koldewey went on to conduct digs for the German Archaeological Institute, at Hellenic sites including Lesbos (1885–1886) and Mesopotamian sites such as Lagash (1887). In 1890–1891 and 1894, he worked with Felix von Luschan on the excavation of a Hellenic city in Sicily.

== Excavation of Babylon ==
With support from the Deutsche Orient-Gesellschaft (German Oriental Society), Koldewey directed the excavation of Babylon from 1899 through 1914, using comparatively modern archaeological techniques. (The site had been identified a century earlier by Claudius James Rich.) More than 200 people worked daily, year round, for fifteen years.

When the team unearthed Babylon's central Processional street in 1899, the modern world had its first look at the site of this much-storied ancient city. The expedition also found the outer walls, inner walls, and foundation of Etemenanki, a temple sometimes identified as the "Tower of Babel". It also unearthed Nebuchadnezzar's palaces.

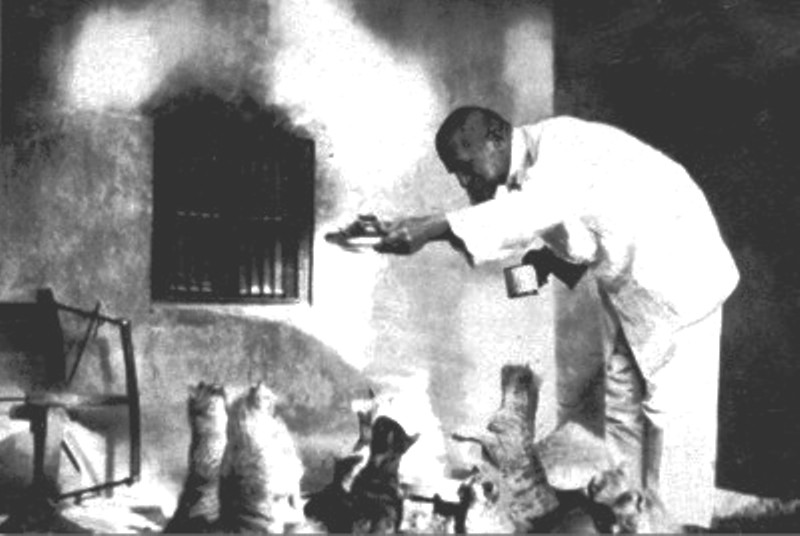
Robert Koldewey

Walter Andrae, a participant in the expedition, later created models of Babylon for the Vorderasiatisches Museum Berlin. The excavations at the famous city of Babylon were considered prestigious for Germany, and were consequently well-sponsored and well-publicized.

=== Hanging Gardens of Babylon ===
The Hanging Gardens of Babylon were a previously unconfirmed legend about a beautiful man-made mountain full of green plants and trees that reportedly were built by King Nebuchadnezzar (ruled 605 BC – 563 BC) for his homesick wife, Amytis, who was daughter of the king of the Medes.

While excavating the Southern Citadel, Robert Koldewey discovered a basement with fourteen large rooms with stone arch ceilings. Ancient texts showed that only two locations in the city had used stone, the north wall of the Northern Citadel, and the Hanging Gardens. The north wall of the Northern Citadel had already been found. This made it seem likely that Koldewey had found the cellar of the gardens.

He continued exploring the area and discovered many of the features reported by the ancient Greek historian Diodorus. While Koldewey was convinced that he had found the gardens, some modern archaeologists have called his discovery into question. While the location of the site that Koldewey excavated was well known and recognised as where Babylon had been situated, they argue that the dig site was too far from the Euphrates River to have been irrigated with the amount of water required for a green garden, and the ancient Greek historian Strabo stated that the Hanging Gardens were located right next to the river. The complex of arched rooms that Koldewey discovered was most likely a storeroom, as cuneiform tablets with lists of supplies and rations were later found in the ruins.

== See also ==
- Biblical archaeology (Jehoiachin's Rations Tablets)
- List of artifacts significant to the Bible

== Notes ==
=== Bibliography ===
- Clayton, Peter A. and Martin J. Price, Ed. "The Seven Wonders of the Ancient World." Routledge: New York, 1988. p 54–55.
- Seymour, Michael John. "The Idea of Babylon: Archaeology and Representation in Mesopotamia". PhD dissertation accepted at University College London, 2006.
- Twardowski, Kristen E. Excavating Imperial Fantasies: The German Oriental Society, 1898–1914. Master's thesis accepted at University of North Carolina, Chapel Hill, 2015.

=== External links ===
- Robert Koldewey Society in Berlin on Koldewey Gesellschaft e.V.
- Full-text scan of The Excavations at Babylon by Robert Koldewey, translated by Agnes S. Johns; London: Macmillan, 1914.
