= Jeremiah 32 =

Book of Jeremiah, chapter 32

- ← chapter 31 chapter 33 →
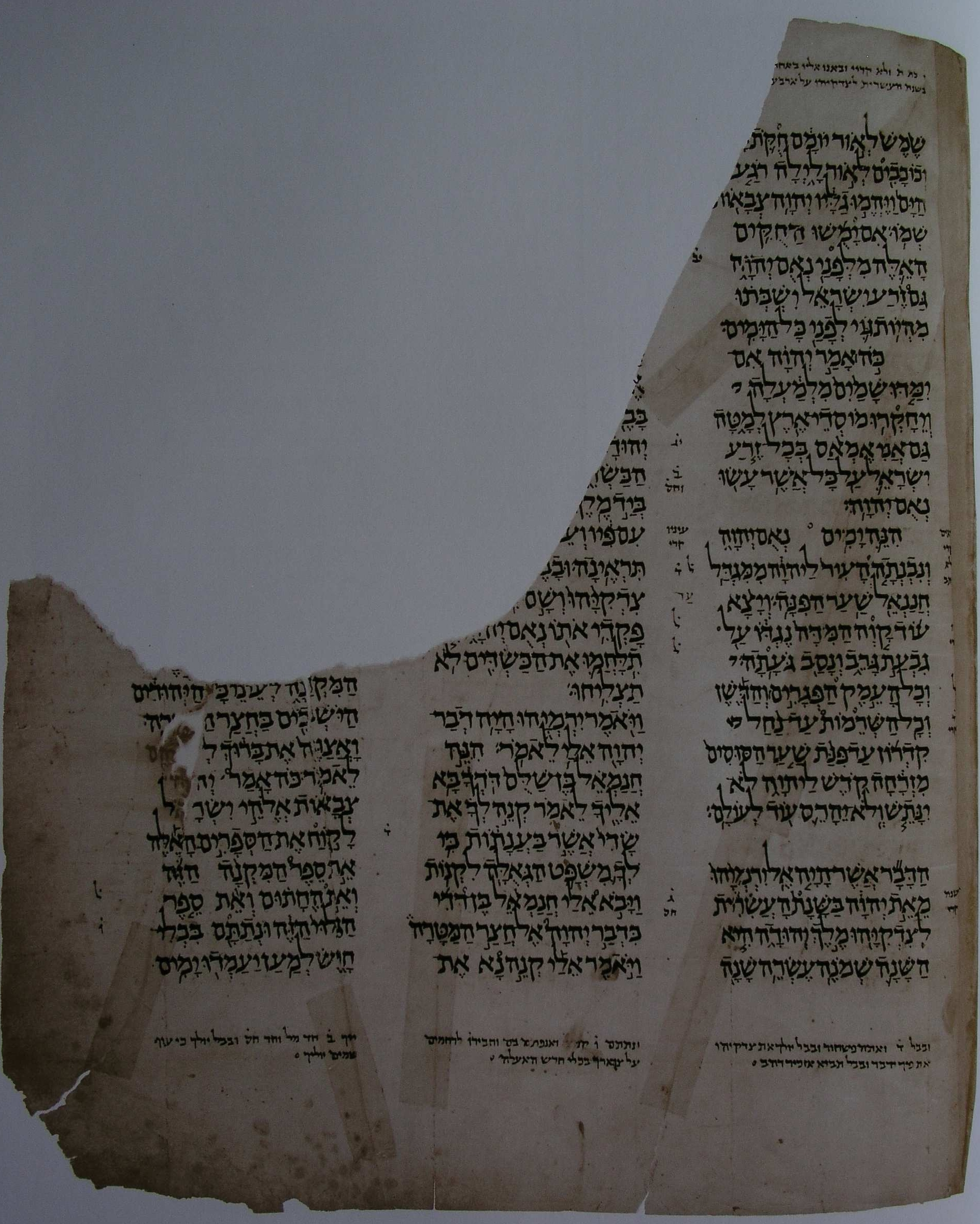
- Partially torn page from Jeremiah (31:34 - 32:14) of the Aleppo Codex from a facsimile edition.
- Book: Book of Jeremiah
- Hebrew Bible part: Nevi'im
- Order in the Hebrew part: 6
- Category: Latter Prophets
- Christian Bible part: Old Testament
- Order in the Christian part: 24

Jeremiah 32 is the thirty-second chapter of the Book of Jeremiah in the Hebrew Bible or the Old Testament of the Christian Bible. It is numbered as Jeremiah 39 in the Septuagint. This book contains prophecies attributed to the prophet Jeremiah, and is one of the Books of the Prophets. In this chapter, Jeremiah redeems a piece of property belonging to his family and explains the significance of his act.

== Text ==
The original text of this chapter, as with the rest of the Book of Jeremiah, was written in Hebrew language. Since the division of the Bible into chapters and verses in the late medieval period, this chapter is divided into 44 verses.

=== Textual witnesses ===
Some early manuscripts containing the text of this chapter in Hebrew are of the Masoretic Text tradition, which includes the Codex Cairensis (895), the Petersburg Codex of the Prophets (916), Aleppo Codex (10th century (Note: Since 1947 only parts containing verses 1, 4-9, 12-21, 24-44 are extant)), Codex Leningradensis (1008). Some fragments possibly containing parts of this chapter were found among the Dead Sea Scrolls, i.e., 2QJer (2Q13; 1st century CE), with extant verses 24–25.

There is also a translation into Koine Greek known as the Septuagint, made in the last few centuries BCE. Extant ancient manuscripts of the Septuagint version include Codex Vaticanus (B; $\mathfrak{G}$^{B}; 4th century), Codex Sinaiticus (S; BHK: $\mathfrak{G}$^{S}; 4th century), Codex Alexandrinus (A; $\mathfrak{G}$^{A}; 5th century) and Codex Marchalianus (Q; $\mathfrak{G}$^{Q}; 6th century).

=== Verse numbering ===
The order of chapters and verses of the Book of Jeremiah in the English Bibles, Masoretic Text (Hebrew), and Vulgate (Latin), in some places differs from that in Septuagint (LXX, the Greek Bible used in the Eastern Orthodox Church and others) according to Rahlfs or Brenton. The following table is taken with minor adjustments from Brenton's Septuagint, page 971.

The order of Computer Assisted Tools for Septuagint/Scriptural Study (CATSS) based on Alfred Rahlfs' Septuaginta (1935), differs in some details from Joseph Ziegler's critical edition (1957) in Göttingen LXX. Swete's Introduction mostly agrees with Rahlfs' edition (=CATSS).

Hebrew, Vulgate, English	Rahlfs' LXX (CATSS)
32:1-44	39:1-44
25:15-38	32:1-24

== Parashot ==
The parashah sections listed here are based on the Aleppo Codex, and those in the missing parts of the codex (since 1947) are from Kimhi's notes, marked with an asterisk (*). Jeremiah 32 is a part of the "Twelfth prophecy (Jeremiah 32-33)" in the "Consolations (Jeremiah 30-33)" section of Prophecies interwoven with narratives about the prophet's life (Jeremiah 26-45). {P}: open parashah; {S}: closed parashah.

{P} 32:1-5 {P} 32:6-14 {S*} 32:15 {P*} 32:16-25 {S} 32:26-35 {S} 32:36-41 {S} 32:42-44 {P}

== Structure ==
This chapter is structured around the purchase of a family field by Jeremiah. The New King James Version divides this chapter into the following sections:

- Jeremiah 32:1–15 = Jeremiah Buys a Field
- Jeremiah 32:16–25 = Jeremiah Prays for Understanding
- Jeremiah 32:26–44 = God's Assurance of the People's Return

== Verse 1 ==
The word that came to Jeremiah from the Lord in the tenth year of Zedekiah king of Judah, which was the eighteenth year of Nebuchadnezzar.

"The tenth year of Zedekiah king of Judah" was 588 BCE. The 18th year of Nebuchadnezzar's reign is dated from his ascension which was marked by a victory at Carchemish. At this time the siege was ongoing against Jerusalem starting from the 10th month of Zedekiah's 9th year (Jeremiah 39:1) until the city was penetrated 18 months later, in the 4th month of Zedekiah's 11th year (Jeremiah 39:2).

== Verse 4 ==
Yet hear the word of the Lord, O Zedekiah king of Judah! Thus says the Lord concerning you: 'You shall not die by the sword.'

- The prophecy is fulfilled that Zedekiah was not executed to death by the king of Babylon, as recorded in 2 Kings 25:7; Jeremiah 39:7; Jeremiah 52:11.

== Verse 5 ==
You shall die in peace; as in the ceremonies of your fathers, the former kings who were before you, so they shall burn incense for you and lament for you, saying, "Alas, lord!" For I have pronounced the word, says the Lord.

- The prophecy is fulfilled that Zedekiah died of natural cause in Babylon, as recorded in 2 Kings 25:7; Jeremiah 39:7; Jeremiah 52:11.

== Verse 12 ==
and I gave the purchase deed to Baruch the son of Neriah, son of Mahseiah, in the presence of Hanamel my uncle's son, and in the presence of the witnesses who signed the purchase deed, before all the Jews who sat in the court of the prison.

- "Baruch": for the first time mentioned here as a companion and witness for Jeremiah. His next appearance in the book is in chapter 36.
- "The Jews": from Hebrew: הַיְּהוּדִ֔ים, ha-yə-hū-ḏîm. Translated as "Ioudaios" in the Septuagint.

== Verse 15 ==
For thus saith the Lord of hosts, the God of Israel; Houses and fields and vineyards shall be possessed again in this land.

- "Houses and fields and vineyards": Jeremiah's purchase shows a remarkable faith and confidence of the future restoration of properties in Israel.

== Verse 22 ==
You have given them this land, of which You swore to their fathers to give them—"a land flowing with milk and honey."

- "A land flowing with milk and honey": citing Exodus 3:8

== See also ==
- Anathoth
- Baal
- Babylon
- Baruch the son of Neriah, son of Mahseiah
- Benjamin
- Chaldea
- Egypt
- Hanamel the son of Shallum
- Israel
- Jeremiah
- Jerusalem
- Judah
- Molech
- Nebuchadnezzar
- Negev
- Shfela
- Valley of the Son of Hinnom
- Zedekiah
- Related Bible part: Leviticus 25

== Sources ==
- Allen, Leslie C. (2008). Jeremiah: A Commentary. Westminster John Knox Press. ISBN 9780664222239.
- Coogan, Michael David (2007). Coogan, Michael David; Brettler, Marc Zvi; Newsom, Carol Ann; Perkins, Pheme (eds.). The New Oxford Annotated Bible with the Apocryphal/Deuterocanonical Books: New Revised Standard Version, Issue 48 (Augmented 3rd ed.). Oxford University Press. ISBN 9780195288810.
- Huey, F. B. (1993). The New American Commentary - Jeremiah, Lamentations: An Exegetical and Theological Exposition of Holy Scripture, NIV Text. B&H Publishing Group. ISBN 9780805401165.
- Ofer, Yosef (1992). "The Aleppo Codex and the Bible of R. Shalom Shachna Yellin" in Rabbi Mordechai Breuer Festschrift: Collected Papers in Jewish Studies, ed. M. Bar-Asher, 1:295-353. Jerusalem (in Hebrew). Online text (PDF)
- O'Connor, Kathleen M. (2007). "23. Jeremiah". In Barton, John; Muddiman, John (eds.). The Oxford Bible Commentary (first (paperback) ed.). Oxford University Press. pp. 487–533. ISBN 978-0199277186.
- Ryle, Herbert Edward (2009). The Cambridge Bible for Schools and Colleges Paperback. BiblioBazaar. ISBN 9781117708690.
- Thompson, J. A. (1980). A Book of Jeremiah. The New International Commentary on the Old Testament (illustrated, revised ed.). Wm. B. Eerdmans Publishing. ISBN 9780802825308.
- Würthwein, Ernst (1995). The Text of the Old Testament. Translated by Rhodes, Erroll F. Grand Rapids, MI: Wm. B. Eerdmans. ISBN 0-8028-0788-7.
