= Rabsaris =

Rabsaris (Hebrew: רַב-סָרִיס raḇ-sārīs), possibly means "Chief of officers", (Akkadian: 𒇽𒃲𒊕 rab ša-rēši [LÚ.GAL.SAG]) is the name or title of two individuals mentioned in the Bible.

- Rabasaris (in the Douay–Rheims Bible and the Vulgate; Greek: Ραφις Raphis) — One of the three officers whom the King of Assyria (Sennacherib) sent from Lachish with a threatening message to Jerusalem (2 Kings 18:17).
- Rabsares (in the Douay–Rheims Bible and the Vulgate) A prince of Nebuchadnezzar (Jeremiah 39:3,13). While originally translated to be the name of the persons it referred to, Rabsaris is now thought to be the name of an office or rank, not an individual.

== See also ==
- Rabshakeh
- Tartan (Assyrian)
