= Turtanu =

Commander-in-chief of the Assyrian army

"Turtanu" or "Turtan" (Akkadian: 𒌉𒋫𒉡 tur-ta-nu; Hebrew: תַּרְתָּן tartān; Greek: Θαρθαν; Latin: Tharthan; Syriac: ܬܵܪܬܵܢ tartan) is an Akkadian word/title meaning 'commander in chief' or 'prime minister'. In Assyria, the Turtanu ranked next to the king.

The Assyrian king would assign the individual who was turtanu to go to battle for him, thus giving great power and influence to the turtanu.

The office seems to have been duplicated, and there was a tartanu imni or 'tartan of the right', as well as a tartanu shumeli or 'tartan of the left'. In later times the title became territorial; we read of a tartan of 'Kummuh' (Commagene). The title is also applied to the commanders of foreign armies; thus Sargon speaks of the Tartan Musurai, or 'Egyptian Tartan'. The Tartan of 720 BC was probably called Ashur-iska-danin; in 694 BC, Abdai, and in 686 BC Bel-emurani, held the title. It does not seem to have been in use among the closely related Babylonians.

== Tartan in Bible ==
There are two references to Tartans in the Hebrew Bible: the Assyrian king sends a Tartan with two other officials to deliver a threatening message to Jerusalem in 2 Kings 18:17, and Sargon II, the king of Assyria, sends a Tartan who takes Ashdod during the reign of King Hezekiah at the time of the prophet Isaiah.

== Examples ==
Dayyan-Assur was turtanu under the reign of Shalmaneser III (859-824BC). Dayyan-Assur led campaigns in lieu of Shalmaneser III who gave him power over the Assyrian army. These campaigns took the Assyrian army and influence into the Zagros, where encounters with future opponents the Medes and Manneans. Another example of a turtanu was Shamshi-ilu. He was the Assyrian military commander under Adad-Nirari III (811-783BC) and later Shalmaneser IV (783-773) as well as others. He appears to have been of Bit-Adini descent, a province annexed by Assyria some time before. He led a campaign against the Argishti I of Urartu.

== Influence ==
The position of turtanu led to a decline of centralized power in Assyria. Shamshi-ilu for example, who was turtanu during four kings reigns, and was one of if not the most powerful individual in Assyria at the time (8th century BC), began to lead out his own campaigns without the sanction of the king. Shamshi-ilu was based out of Kar-Shalmaneser and began campaigning for his own kingdom west of the Euphrates. These campaigns led to greater power held by Shamshi-ilu and a fragmentary Assyria.

== See also ==
- Rabshakeh
- Rabsaris
- Encyclopaedia Biblica: Tartan
