= Jehoiachin's Rations Tablets =

Archaeological artifacts

Jehoiachin's Rations Tablet
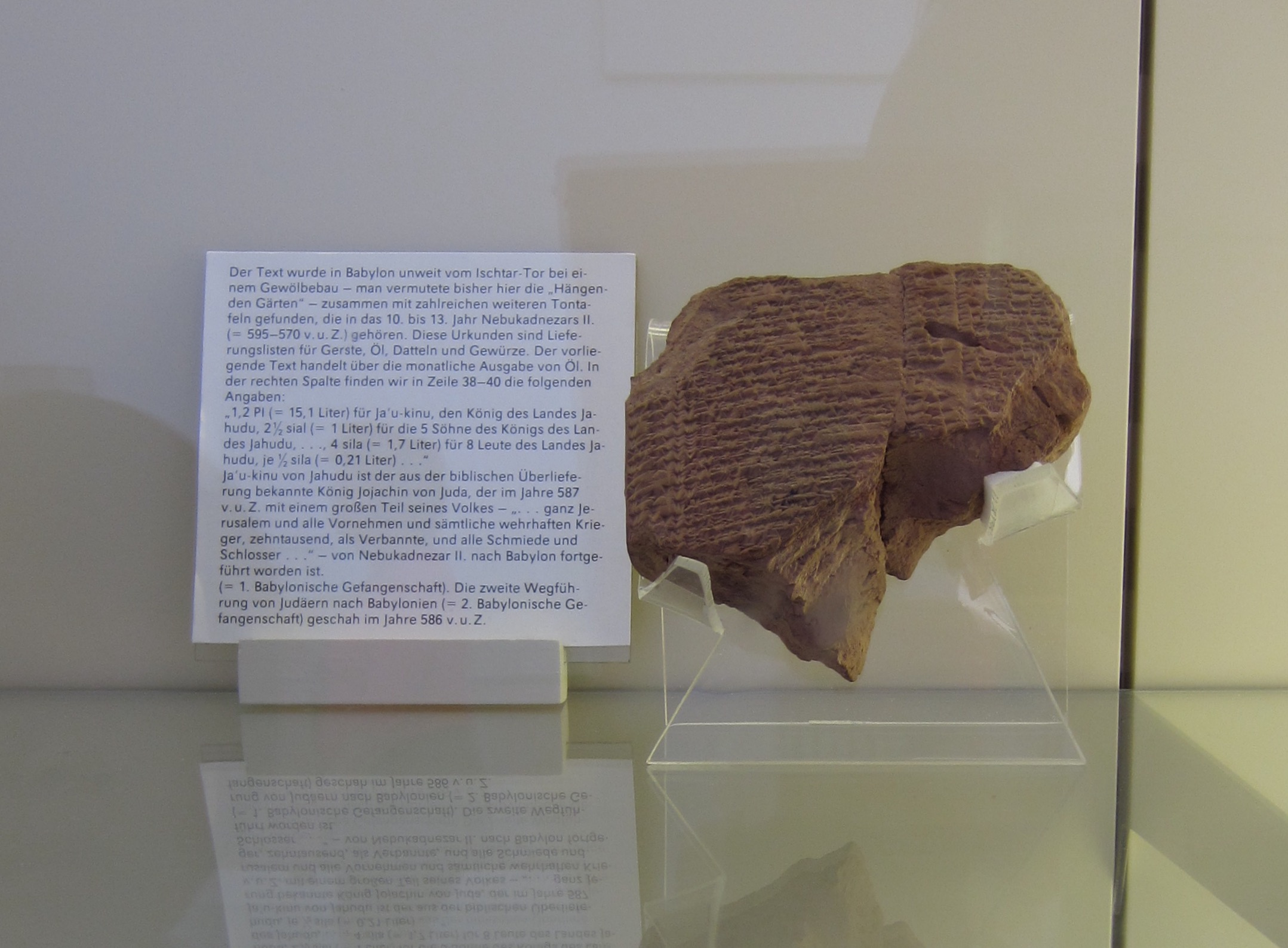
- Tablet listing ration for King Jehoiachin and his sons, captives in Babylon
- Material: Clay
- Size: 9.2 cm high, 10.5 wide
- Writing: Akkadian language in cuneiform script
- Created: Neo-Babylonian period (ca. 595–570 B.C.E.)
- Discovered: within 1899 to 1917, near the Ishtar Gate
- Present location: Museum of the Ancient Near East, Pergamon Museum, Berlin, room 6
- Identification: VAT 16378

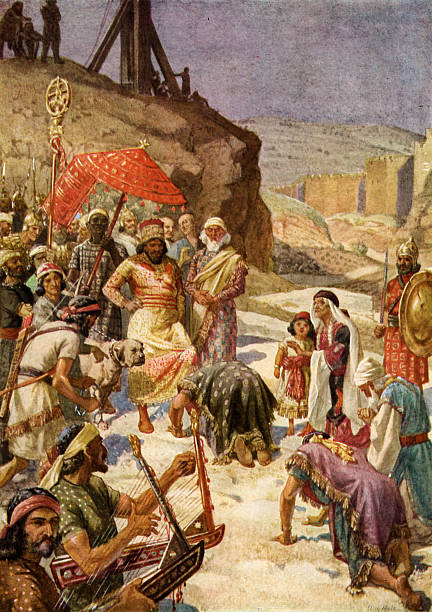
Jeconiah submitting to Nebuchadnezzar in 597 BC. (Painting by William Hole)

Jehoiachin's rations tablets date from the 6th century BC and describe the oil rations set aside for a royal captive identified as Jeconiah, king of Judah. Tablets from the royal archives of Nebuchadnezzar II, emperor of the Neo-Babylonian Empire, were unearthed in the ruins of Babylon that contain food rations paid to captives and craftsmen who lived in and around the city. On one of the tablets, "Ya’u-kīnu, king of the land of Yahudu" is mentioned along with his five sons listed as royal princes.

== Excavation ==
The tablets were excavated from Babylon during 1899–1917 by Robert Koldewey and were stored in a barrel-vaulted underground building consisting of rows of rooms near the Ishtar Gate.

== Translation ==
The tablets' text states:

Babylon 28122: "...t[o] Ia-'-u-kin, king..."
Babylon 28178: "10 (sila of oil) to ...Ia-'-kin, king of Ia[...] 2 1/2 sila to [...so]ns of the king of Ia-a-hu-du"
Babylon 28186: "10 (sila) to Ia-ku-u-ki-nu, the son of the king of Ia-ku-du, 2 1/2 sila for the 5 sons of the king of Ia-ku-du"

Another tablet reads:

1 1/2 sila (oil) for three carpenters from Arvad, 1/2 apiece,
11 1/2 sila for eight woodworkers from Byblos, . . .
3 1/2 sila for seven Greek craftsman, 1/2 sila apiece,
1/2 sila to the carpenter, Nabuetir
10 sila to Ia-ku-u-ki-nu, the king of Judah’s son,
2 1/2 sila for the five sons of the Judean king.

A sila is a Babylonian unit of capacity equivalent to approximately 800 mL (1.7 US pints).

== See also ==
- List of artifacts significant to the Bible
- Biblical archaeology (excavations and artifacts)
