= Rabshakeh =

Assyrian officer

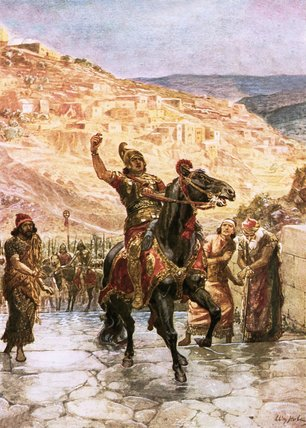
Rabshakeh illustration, by William Brassey Hole

Rabshakeh (Akkadian: 𒃲𒁉𒈜𒈨𒌍 rab šāqê [GAL.BI.LUL.MEŠ]; Hebrew: רַבְשָׁקֵה, Modern: Ravšaqē, Tiberian: Raḇšāqē; Ancient Greek: Ραψακης Rapsakēs; Latin: Rabsaces; Assyrian Neo-Aramaic: ܪܲܒ݂ܫܵܩܹ̈ܐ; alternative spellings include Rab-shakeh, Rabsaces, or Rab shaqe) is a title meaning "chief of the princes/cup-bearers" in the Semitic Akkadian and Aramaic languages. The title was given to the chief cup-bearer or the vizier of the Akkadian, Assyrian and Babylonian royal courts in ancient Mesopotamia, and revived by the Assyrians as a military rank during World War I.

== Biblical accounts ==
The Hebrew Bible states that one of Sennacherib's messengers to Hezekiah is a Rabshakeh, sent to Jerusalem along with the Turtanu and the Rabsaris. In 2 Kings 18:27–37 and in Isaiah, 36:2–20 the Rabshakeh addresses the Jerusalemites in the Hebrew language.
