= Jeremiah =

Biblical prophet

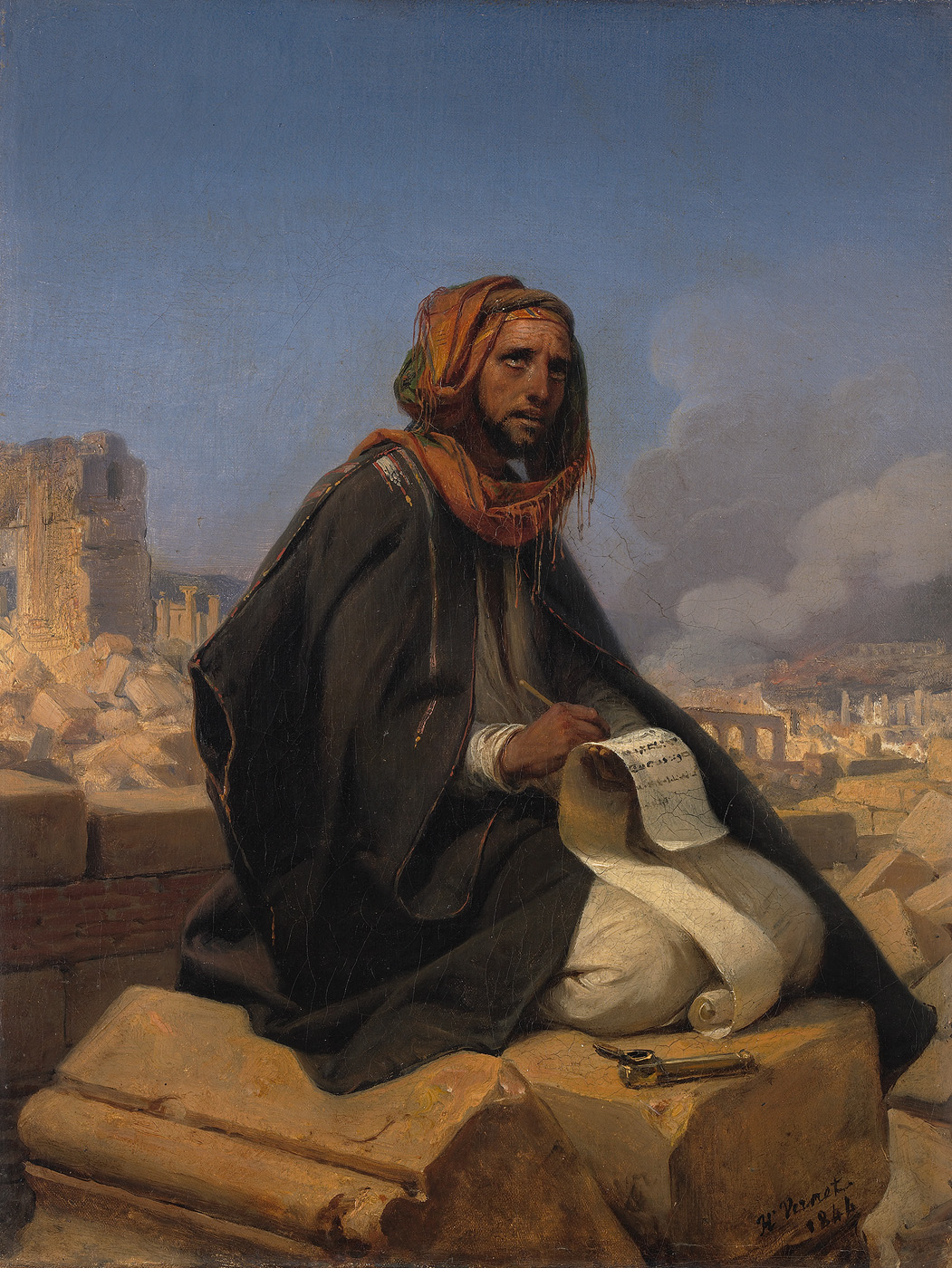
- Jeremiah on the Ruins of Jerusalem by Horace Vernet, 1844
- Born: c. 650 BC; Anathoth
- Died: c. 570 BC; Egypt
- Known for: Being a Prophet
- Parent: Hilkiah

Jeremiah (Note: Pronounced /ˌdʒɛrɪˈmaɪ.ə/;) (Note: Hebrew: יִרְמְיָהוּ, romanized: Yirmĭyāhū, lit. 'Yah shall raise', Koine Greek: Ἰερεμίας, romanized: Ieremíās Arabic: إِرۡمِيَا بۡنُ حَلۡقِيَا, romanized: Irmiya̅ ibn Halqiya, lit. 'Jeremiah, son of Hilkiah') (c. 650 – c. 570 BC), also called Jeremias, and occasionally in older English texts Jeremy, was one of the major prophets of the Hebrew Bible. According to Jewish tradition, Jeremiah authored the book that bears his name, the Books of Kings, and the Book of Lamentations, with the assistance and under the editorship of Baruch ben Neriah, his scribe and disciple.

According to the narrative of the Book of Jeremiah, the prophet emerged as a significant figure in the Kingdom of Judah in the late 7th and early 6th centuries BC. Born into a priestly lineage, Jeremiah reluctantly accepted his call to prophethood, embarking on a tumultuous ministry more than five decades long. His life was marked by opposition, imprisonment, and personal struggles, according to Jeremiah 32 and 37. Central to Jeremiah's message were prophecies of impending divine judgment, forewarning of the nation's idolatry, social injustices, and moral decay. According to the Bible, he prophesied the siege of Jerusalem and Babylonian captivity as consequences for disobedience. Jeremiah's teachings encompassed lamentations, oracles, and symbolic acts, emphasising the urgency of repentance and the restoration of a covenant relationship with God.

Jeremiah is an essential figure in both Judaism and Christianity. His words are read in synagogues as part of the haftara and he is quoted in the New Testament. Islam also regards Jeremiah as a prophet and his narrative is recounted in Islamic tradition.

== Biblical narratives ==
=== Lineage and early life ===
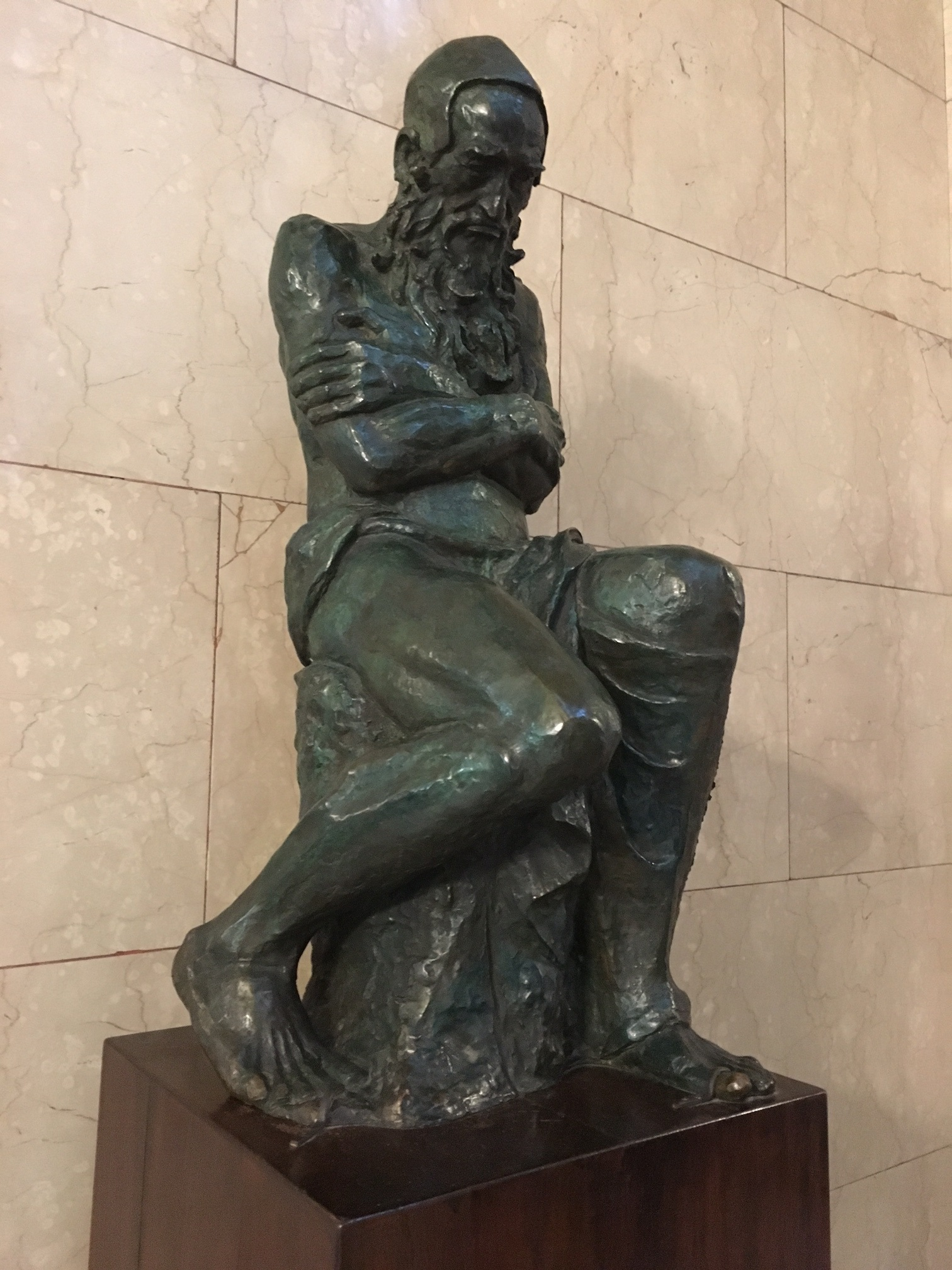
Jeremiah by Enrico Glicenstein

Jeremiah was known as a prophet from the thirteenth year of Josiah, king of Judah (626 BC), until after the fall of Jerusalem and the destruction of Solomon's Temple in 587 BC. This period spanned the reigns of five kings of Judah: Josiah, Jehoahaz, Jehoiakim, Jehoiachin, and Zedekiah. The prophetess Huldah was a relative and contemporary of Jeremiah, while the prophet Zephaniah was his mentor.

Jeremiah was the son of Hilkiah, a priest from the land of Benjamin in the village of Anathoth. The difficulties he encountered, as described in the books of Jeremiah and Lamentations, have prompted scholars to refer to him as "the weeping prophet".

Jeremiah was called to prophecy c. 626 BC by God to proclaim Jerusalem's coming destruction by invaders from the north. This was because Israel had forsaken God by worshiping the idols of Baal and burning their children as offerings to Baal. The nation had deviated so far from God's laws that they had broken the covenant, causing God to withdraw his blessings. Jeremiah was guided by God to proclaim that the nation of Judah would suffer famine, foreign conquest, plunder, and captivity in a land of strangers.

According to Jeremiah 1:2–3, Yahweh called Jeremiah to prophesy in about 626 BC, about five years before Josiah's famous reforms. However, they were insufficient to save Judah and Jerusalem from destruction, because of the sins of Manasseh, Josiah's grandfather, and Judah's return to the idolatry of foreign gods after Josiah's death. Jeremiah was said to have been appointed to reveal the sins of the people and the punishment to come.

Jeremiah resisted the call by complaining that he was only a child and did not know how to speak, but the Lord placed the word in Jeremiah's mouth, commanding "Get yourself ready!" The qualities of a prophet listed in Jeremiah 1 include not being afraid, standing up to speak, speaking as told, and going where sent. Since Jeremiah is described as emerging well trained and fully literate from his earliest preaching, his relationship with the Shaphan family has been used to suggest that he may have trained at the scribal school in Jerusalem over which Shaphan presided.

In his early years of being a prophet, Jeremiah was primarily a preaching prophet, preaching throughout Israel. He condemned idolatry, the greed of priests, and false prophets. Many years later, God instructed Jeremiah to write down these early oracles and his other messages. Charles Cutler Torrey argues that the prophet accuses priests and scribes of altering the actual Scriptures with "scribal additions" to accommodate the worship of other deities.

=== Persecution ===
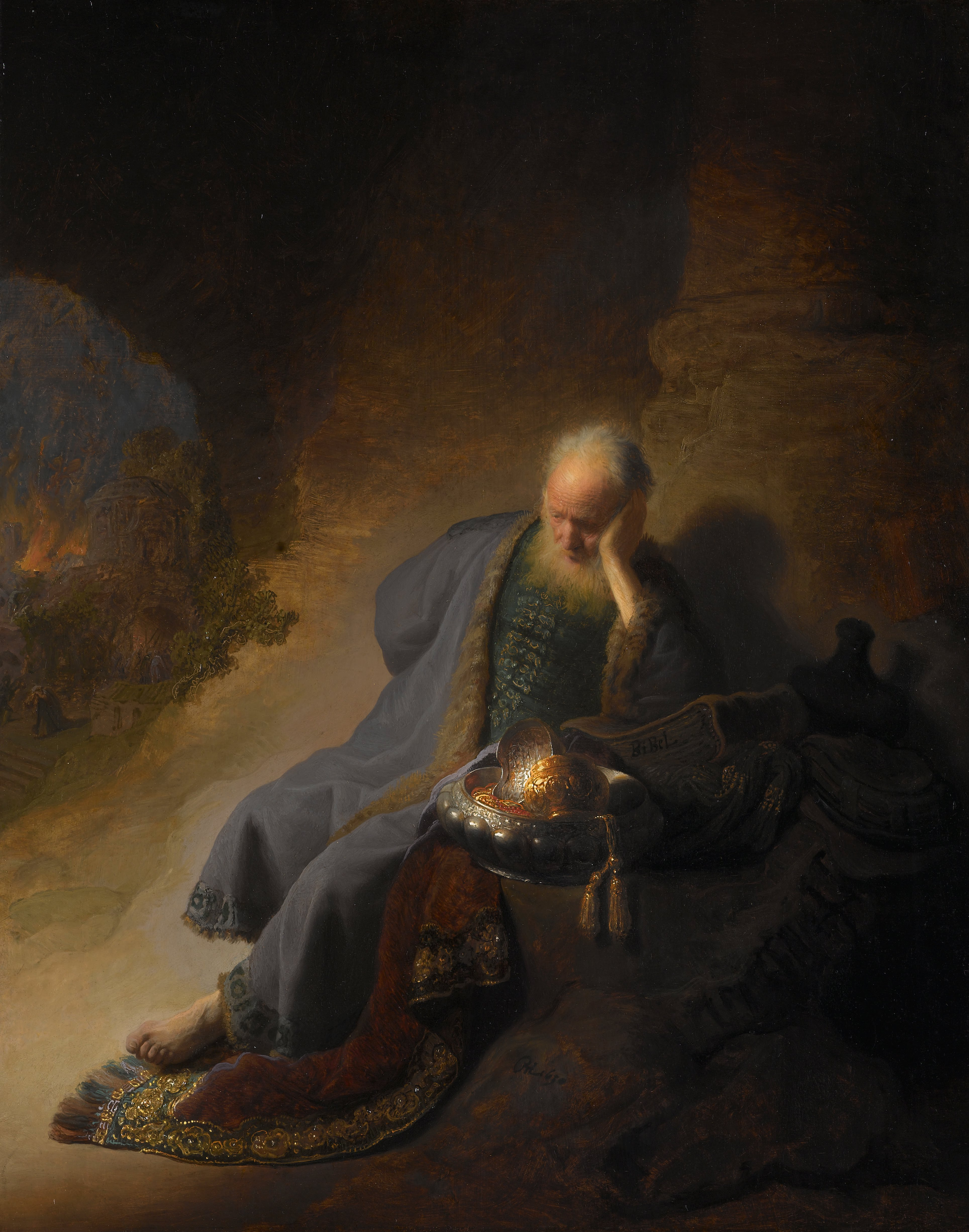
Rembrandt van Rijn, Jeremiah Lamenting the Destruction of Jerusalem (c. 1630)

Jeremiah's prophecies prompted plots against him. Unhappy with Jeremiah's message, possibly from concern that it would shut down the Anathoth sanctuary, his priestly kin and the men of Anathoth plotted to kill him. However, the Lord revealed the conspiracy to Jeremiah, protected his life, and declared disaster for the people of Anathoth. When Jeremiah complains to the Lord about this persecution, he is told that the attacks on him will become worse.

A priest, Pashur the son of Immer, a temple official in Jerusalem, had Jeremiah beaten and put in the stocks at the Upper Gate of Benjamin for a day. After this, Jeremiah laments the travails and mockery that speaking God's word have caused him. He recounts how, if he tries to shut God's word inside, it burns in his heart and he is unable to hold it in.

=== Conflict with false prophets ===
While Jeremiah was prophesying the coming destruction, he denounced a number of other prophets who were prophesying peace.

According to the book of Jeremiah, during the reign of King Zedekiah, the Lord instructed Jeremiah to make a yoke with the message that the nation would be subject to the king of Babylon. The false prophet Hananiah took the yoke off Jeremiah's neck and broke it, prophesying that within two years the Lord would break the yoke of the king of Babylon, but Jeremiah prophesied in return: "You have broken the yoke of wood, but you have made instead a yoke of iron."

=== Relationship with the Northern Kingdom (Samaria) ===
Jeremiah was sympathetic to, as well as descended from, the northern Kingdom of Israel. Many of his first reported oracles are about, and addressed to, the Israelites at Samaria. He resembles the northern prophet Hosea in his use of language and examples of God's relationship to Israel. Hosea seems to have been the first prophet to describe the desired relationship as an example of ancient Israelite marriage, where a man might be polygamous, while a woman was only permitted one husband. Jeremiah often repeats Hosea's marital imagery.

=== Babylon ===
The biblical narrative portrays Jeremiah as being subject to additional persecutions. After Jeremiah prophesied that Jerusalem would be handed over to the Babylonian army, the king's officials, including Pashur the priest, tried to convince King Zedekiah that Jeremiah should be put to death for disheartening the soldiers and the people. Zedekiah allowed them, and they cast Jeremiah into a cistern, where he sank down into the mud. The intent seemed to be to kill Jeremiah by starvation, while allowing the officials to claim to be innocent of his blood. Ebed-Melech, an Ethiopian, rescued Jeremiah by pulling him out of the cistern, but Jeremiah remained imprisoned until Jerusalem fell to the Babylonian army in 587 BC.

The Babylonians released Jeremiah, and showed him great kindness, allowing him to choose the place of his residence, according to a Babylonian edict. Jeremiah accordingly went to Mizpah in Benjamin with Gedaliah, who had been made governor of Judea.

=== Egypt ===
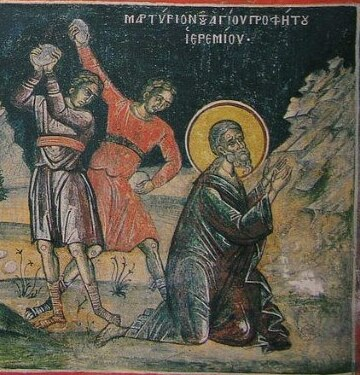
Fresco from Dionysiou Monastery

Johanan succeeded Gedaliah, who had been assassinated by an Israelite prince in the pay of Ammon "for working with the Babylonians." Refusing to listen to Jeremiah's counsel, Johanan fled to Egypt, taking with him Jeremiah and Baruch, Jeremiah's faithful scribe and servant, and the king's daughters. There, the prophet probably spent the remainder of his life, still seeking to turn the people back to God. There is no authentic record of his death. The Elephantine papyrus reflects that Yahweh's wife or consort is still acknowledged in worship and liturgy at the site as late as 419 BC, and several scholars have noted that this feature of the cultural landscape in the place of his exile is likely to have left him disconsolate or perturbed during the final years of his life.

== Historicity ==
The consensus is that there was a historical prophet named Jeremiah and that portions of the book probably were written by Jeremiah or his scribe Baruch. Views range from the belief that the narratives and poetic sections in Jeremiah are contemporary with his life (W. L. Holladay), to the view that the work of the original prophet is beyond identification or recovery (R. P. Carroll).

According to Rainer Albertz, first there were early collections of oracles, including material in ch. 2–6, 8–10, 13, 21–23, etc. Then there was an early Deuteronomistic redaction which Albertz dates to around 550 BC, with the original ending to the book at 25:13. There was a second redaction around 545–540 BC which added much more material, up to about ch. 45. Then there was a third redaction around 525–520 BC, expanding the book up to the ending at 51:64. Then there were further post-exilic redactions adding ch. 52 and editing content throughout the book.

Although Jeremiah was often thought of traditionally as the author of the Book of Lamentations, it may also be a collection of individual and communal laments by others composed at various times throughout the Babylonian captivity—interpretations on this question continue to swing both ways.

=== Archaeology ===
==== Nebo-Sarsekim tablet ====
In July 2007, Assyrologist Michael Jursa translated a cuneiform tablet dated to 595 BC, as describing a Nabusharrussu-ukin as "the chief eunuch" of Nebuchadnezzar II of Babylon. Jursa hypothesized that this reference might be to the same individual as the Nebo-Sarsekim mentioned in Jeremiah 39:3.

==== Seals ====
A 7th-century BC seal of Jehucal, son of Shelemiah and another of Gedaliah, son of Pashhur (mentioned together in Jeremiah 38:1; Jehucal also mentioned in Jeremiah 37:3) were found during excavation by Eilat Mazar in the city of David, Jerusalem, in 2005 and 2008, respectively.

==== Tel Arad ostraca ====
Pottery shards at Tel Arad were unearthed in the 1970s that mention Pashhur, and this reference may be to the same individual mentioned in Jeremiah 20:1.

== Religious views ==
Saint Jeremiah Prophet
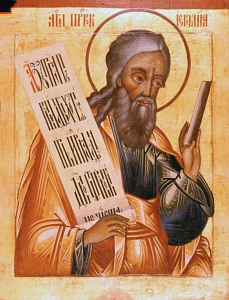
- Russian Orthodox icon of Jeremias

Prophet
- Venerated in: All Christian denominations that venerate saints Judaism; Islam; Baháʼí Faith; Rastafari
- Major works: Book of Jeremiah

=== Judaism ===
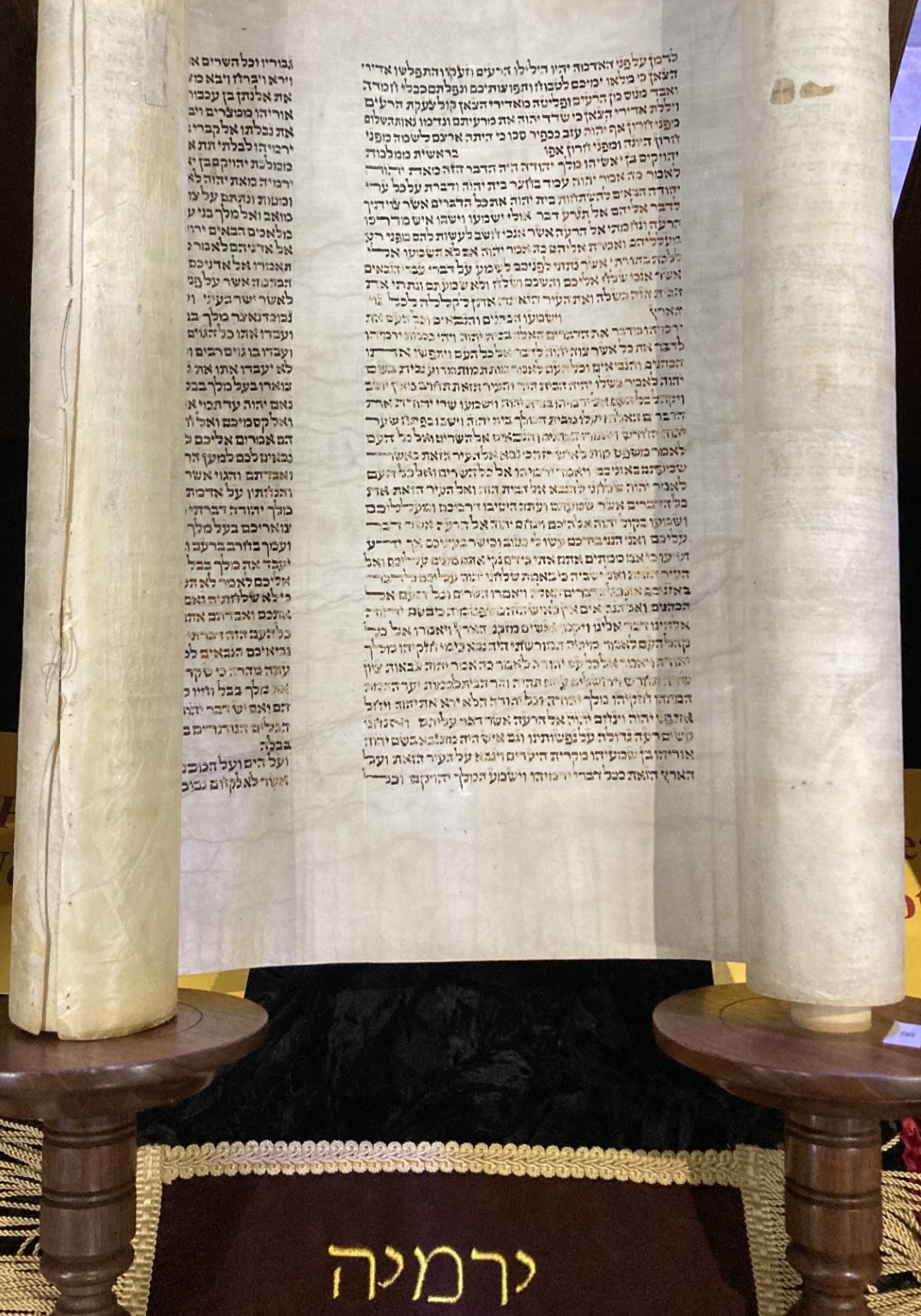
Scroll of the Book of Jeremiah

In Jewish rabbinic literature, especially the aggadah, Jeremiah and Moses are always mentioned together, An ancient midrash, in connection with Deuteronomy 18:18 presented their life and works in parallel, in which "a prophet like Moses" is promised, states Jeremiah's time as prophet was similar to Moses, which is 40 years. Moses also prophesied that his own tribe, Tribe of Levi, will rebel against Judah, while Jeremiah's tribe would in turn rebel against Jeremiah himself. In the year of the prophesied event, Moses also said that he himself will be exiled into watery areas, while Jeremiah will be jailed in a pit. Then Moses will be saved by a slave of Pharaoh's daughter, while subsequently Jeremiah will be rescued by a slave named Ebed-melech; After such, the Deuteronomy closed the chapter with Moses reprimanded the people in discourses; so did Jeremiah. The prophet Ezekiel was a son of Jeremiah according to rabbinic literature. In 2 Maccabees 2:4ff, Jeremiah is credited with hiding the Ark, incense altar, and tabernacle on the mountain of Moses.

=== Christianity ===
Christian worship services regularly include readings from the Book of Jeremiah. The author of the Gospel of Matthew is especially mindful of how the events in the life, death and resurrection of Jesus fulfill Jeremianic prophecies. There are about forty direct quotations of the book in the New Testament, most appearing in Revelation 18 in connection with the destruction of Babylon. The Epistle to the Hebrews also picks up the fulfilment of the prophetic expectation of the new covenant.

He was first added to Bede's Martyrology.

In Christianity, there are several feast days which commemorate Jeremiah:

- 16 January – commemoration of overthrowing the Idols by prophet Jeremiah (OO)
- 7 April – Saint Michael delivers Jeremiah from prison (OO)
- 30 April – Martyrdom of Jeremiah the Prophet (OO)
- 1 May – commemoration in Catholic Church and Eastern Orthodox Church
- 26 June – commemoration in LCMS (R)

=== Islam ===
Prophet Irmiya̅ Alayhi as-Salam
- إِرۡمِيَا; Jeremiah
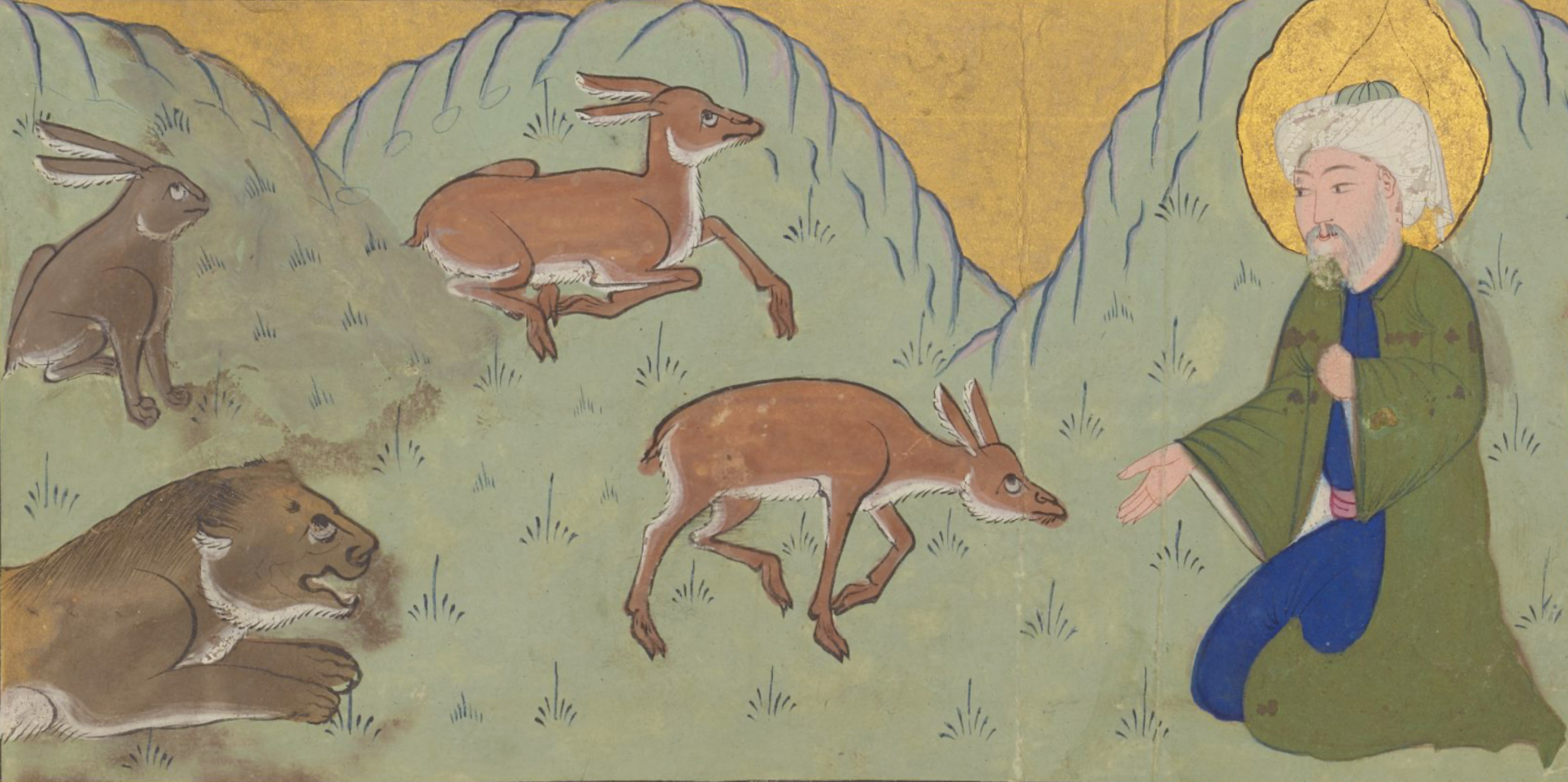
- Irmiya taming animals in the wilderness.

Prophet of Islam
- Preceded by: Yunus
- Succeeded by: Dhu al-Kifl

Personal life
- Born: Irmiya ibn Halqiya; 650 BC Kingdom of Judah
- Died: 570 BC (age 80) Egypt
- Parent: Halqiya (father)

Religious life
- Religion: Islam

Jeremiah (Arabic: إِرۡمِيَا بۡنُ حَلۡقِيَا, romanized: Irmiya ibn Halqiya, lit. 'Jeremiah, son of Hilkiah'; 650 BC – 570 BC) is regarded as a prophet in Islam. In Arabic, Jeremiah's name is usually vocalised Irmiyā, Armiyā or Ūrmiyā. However, since the name of Jeremiah is not explicitly mentioned in the Quran and Hadith, belief in Jeremiah was considered not part of the Five Pillars of Islam by the academic community of Islam, who regarded Jeremiah instead as historical supplementary material, since his name was only found in the tafsir and other non-canonical Islamic literature. Nevertheless, since his status as prophet was generally undisputed in Islam, Muslims apply "PBUH" or "Peace Be Upon Him" as an honorific for Jeremiah.

The narratives of Jeremiah in Islamic belief closely correspond with the account given in the Hebrew Bible, and are found in the Ibn Kathir work of al-Bidaya wa l-Nihaya & Qisas Al-Anbiya (History of prophets), Al-Tabari work of "History of the Prophets and Kings", and Ibn Asakir work of "History of Damascus".

Islamic literature narrated a detailed account of the Siege of Jerusalem (587 BC), which parallels the account given in the Book of Jeremiah.

==== Interpretation of Quran and Hadith ====
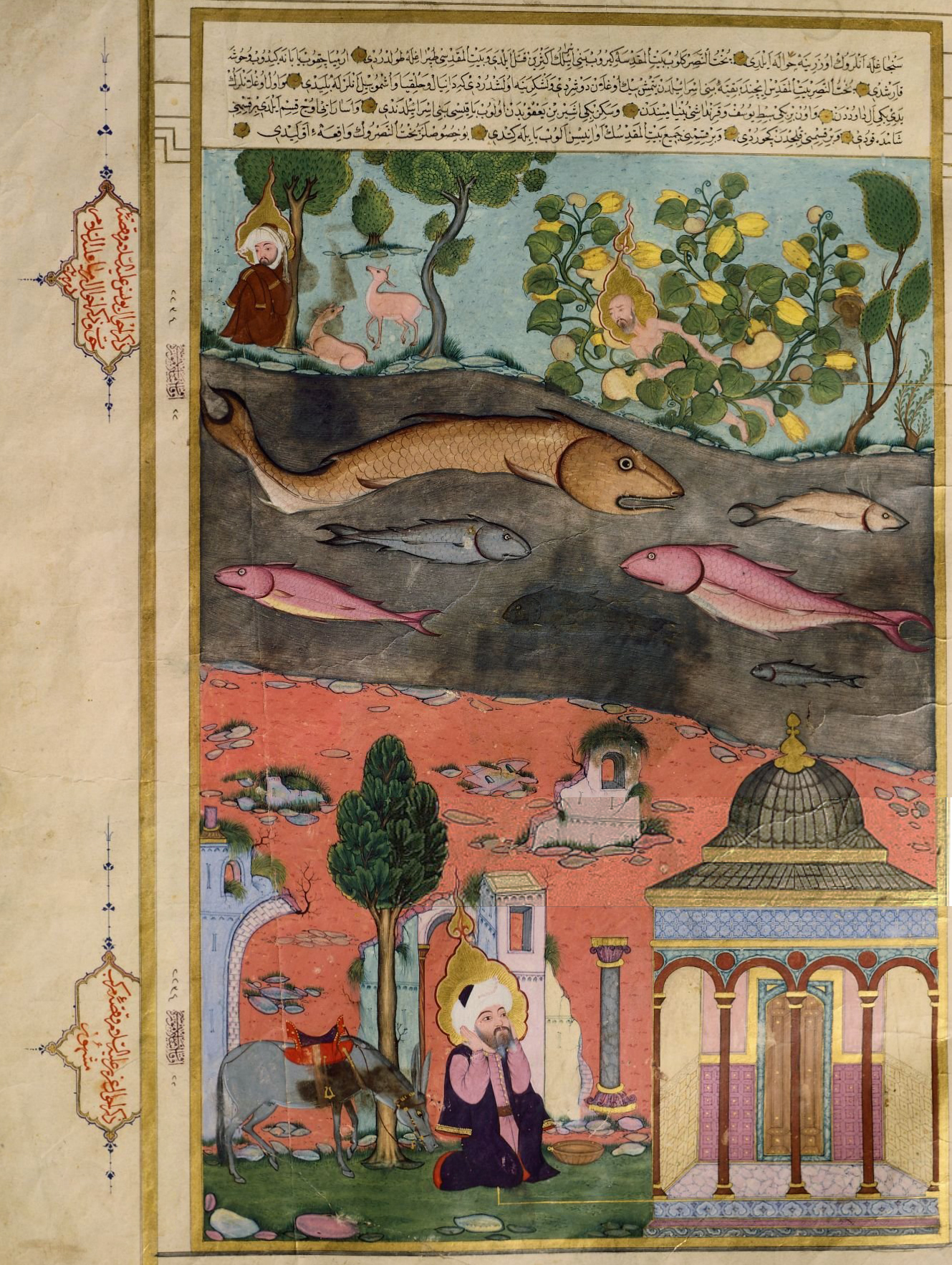
Islamic illustration of Irmiya hiding in the wilderness (top), Yunus and the fish (middle) and Uzayr awaking after the destruction of al Qods (bottom) from the 1583 Cream of Histories

The oldest Islamic narration about Jeremiah was found in the tradition from Ibn Abbas, which identified Jeremiah as Khidr. (Note: Similar narration about the identification as Khidr also found in the record of Tabari, which detailed the event was during the destruction of Jerusalem.) However, This Hadith tradition was considered inauthentic and not generally accepted by Ibn Kathir in his work, al-Bidaya wa l-Nihaya.

According to al-Qurtubi, the interpretation of the 11th verse Quran chapter Al-Anbiya has mentioned the unnamed figure in the verse as Jeremiah, which musing in the similar narrative with the biblical version of Nebuchadnezzar's invasion of Jerusalem. However, al-Qurtubi also further added in his interpretation that during the meeting of Jeremiah with Nebuchadnezzar, Jeremiah revealed to him about the prophesied advent of Muhammad in the land of Hejaz.

Ibn Kathir tafsir narrate that the Parable of the Hamlet in Ruins, which from the 259th verse of Al-Baqara chapter focused about Jeremiah, when he was commanded by God to reconstruct the devastated Jerusalem after Nebuchadnezzar's invasion.

In Quran Sura (chapter) 17 (Al-Isra), Ayah (verse) 4–7, that is about the two corruptions of children of Israel on the earth, some hadith and tafsir cite that one of these corruptions is the imprisonment and persecution of Jeremiah. Separately, Ibn Kathir interpretation of the 11th verse of al-Isra also discussed about Jeremiah.

==== Other traditions ====
Ibn Asakir has mentioned in his work titled Tarikh Dimashq (History of Damascus), that Jeremiah was a son of Hilkiah, who hailed from the tribe of Levy which descended from Jacob. According to one tradition which recorded by Ibn Kathir, Wahb has narrated that the timeline of Jeremiah as prophet was between the era of David and the era of Zechariah.

Wahb ibn Munabbih, who gave Israʼiliyyat account about Jeremiah which turned "upon the main points of the Old Testament story of Jeremiah: his call to be a prophet, his mission to the king of Judah, his mission to the people and his reluctance, the announcement of a foreign tyrant who is to rule over Judah."

According to some Jewish narratives and Ibn Kathir, Zoroaster was once a disciple of Jeremiah. (Note: Sibt ibn al-Jawzi instead stated that some older narration said that Zoroaster was a former disciple of Uzair.) However, the two of them came into conflict which ended with Jeremiah disowning Zoroaster. Jeremiah then cast a curse upon Zoroaster, causing him to suffer leprosy. Zoroaster later moved to a place in modern-day Azerbaijan, ruled by Bashtaasib, governor of Nebuchadnezzar, and spread his teaching of Zoroastrianism there. Bashtaasib then followed his teaching, forced the inhabitants of Persia to convert to Zoroastrianism and killed those who refused. Ibn Kathir quoted the original narrative which was borrowed from Tabari's record of the "History of Jerusalem". He also mentioned that Zoroastrian was synonymous with Majus.

==== Religious ritual ====
Jeremiah is listed amongst the prophets in the work of salawat Dalail al-Khayrat, an Islamic prayer collection made by Muhammad al-Jazuli from Shadhili order of Sufi.

=== Baháʼí Faith ===
In the Baháʼí Faith, Jeremiah is regarded as one of the prophets along with David, Solomon, Isaiah, Ezekiel, and others.

== Cultural influence ==
Jeremiah inspired the French noun jérémiade, and subsequently the English jeremiad, meaning "a lamentation; mournful complaint," or further, "a cautionary or angry harangue."

Jeremiah has periodically been a popular first name in the United States, beginning with the early Puritan settlers, who often took the names of biblical prophets and apostles. Jeremiah was substituted for the Irish Diarmuid/Diarmaid (also anglicised as Dermot), with which it has no etymological connection, when Gaelic names were frowned upon in official records. The name Jeremy also derives from Jeremiah.

Sohrab Sepehri, an Iranian poet and painter, has mentioned Jeremiah in his work as "The weeping prophet".

== Notes and references ==
=== Bibliography ===
- Albertz, Rainer (2003). Israel in Exile: The History and Literature of the Sixth Century B.C.E. Society of Biblical Lit. ISBN 978-1-58983-055-4.
- "Levirate Marriage and Halizah". Encyclopedia Judaica. Vol. 11 (2nd ed.). MacMillan. 1971.
- Webster's Encyclopedic Unabridged Dictionary of the English Language. New York: Portland House. 1989. ISBN 978-0-517-68781-9.
- Barker, Kenneth L.; Youngblood, Ronald F.; Stek, John H., eds. (1995). "Commentary of Jeremiah". The NIV Study Bible. Zondervan. ISBN 978-0-31092588-0.
- Collins, Marilyn F. (1972). "The Hidden Vessels in Samaritan Traditions". Journal for the Study of Judaism in the Persian, Hellenistic, and Roman Period. 3 (2): 97–116. doi:10.1163/157006372X00018. JSTOR 24656260.
- Coogan, Michael David (2012). A Brief Introduction to the Old Testament: The Hebrew Bible in Its Context. Oxford University Press. ISBN 978-0-19-983011-4.
- Dillard, Raymond B.; Longman, Tremper (1994). An Introduction to the Old Testament (2nd ed.). Zondervan. ISBN 978-0-310-43250-0.
- Douglas, James D. (1987). The New Bible Dictionary (2nd ed.). Tyndale Press. ISBN 978-0-85110-820-9.
- Freedman, David Noel (1992). The Anchor Bible Dictionary: A-C. Doubleday. ISBN 978-0-385-19351-1.
- Henderson, Joseph (2002). "Who Weeps In Jeremiah VIII 23 (IX 1)? Identifying Dramatic Speakers In The Poetry Of Jeremiah". Vetus Testamentum. 52 (2): 191–206. doi:10.1163/156853302760013857. ISSN 0042-4935.
- Hillers, Delbert R. (1972). The Anchor Bible. Vol. Lamentations.
- ——— (1993). "The Lamentations of Jeremiah". In Bruce M. Metzger; Michael David Coogan (eds.). The Oxford Companion to the Bible. Oxford University Press. ISBN 978-0-19-974391-9.
- Hobbins, John (2007). "Jeremiah 39:3 and History: A New Find Clarifies a Mess of a Text". Ancient Hebrew Poetry. Typepad. Archived from the original on 2011-08-07.
- Kantrowitz, Jonathan (3 January 2012). "Archaeology News Report: Seals of Jeremiah's Captors Discovered!". Archived from the original on 21 December 2016.
- Longman, Tremper (2008). Jeremiah, Lamentations. Hendrickson. ISBN 978-1-85364735-2.
- Marsh, Allen Bythel (April 2018). How ובּש ׁand םַחָנ contribute to understanding the meaning of Jeremiah 4:28, 15:6-7, 18:7-10 and 26:3, 13 and 19 (PDF) (Ph.D). Archived from the original (PDF) on 8 April 2020.
- Renda, G’nsel (1978). "The Miniatures of the Zubdat Al- Tawarikh". Turkish Treasures Culture /Art / Tourism Magazine. Archived from the original on 2016-09-04.
- Reynolds, Nigel (11 July 2007). "Ancient Document Confirms Existence of Biblical Figure". The New York Sun. Archived from the original on 5 August 2011.
- Ryken, Philip Graham (2001). Jeremiah and Lamentations: From Sorrow to Hope. Crossway Books. ISBN 978-1-58134-167-6.
- Schroeder, Joy A. (2018). "Medieval Christian Interpretation of the Book of Jeremiah". In Lundbom, J.; Evans, C.A.; Anderson, B. (eds.). The Book of Jeremiah: Composition, Reception, and Interpretation. Vetus Testamentum, Supplements. Brill. ISBN 978-90-04-37327-3.
- Singer, Isidore, ed. (1926). "Jeremiah". Jewish Encyclopaedia: A Descriptive Record of the History, Religion, Literature, and Customs of the Jewish People from the Earliest Times to the Present Day. Vol. VII. New York: Funk & Wagnall. OCLC 426865.
- Sweeney, Marvin A. (2004). "Introduction to Jeremiah". In Adele Berlin; Marc Zvi Brettler (eds.). The Jewish Study Bible. Oxford University Press. p. 917. ISBN 978-0-19-529751-5 – via Jewish Publication Society Tanakh Translation.
- Sweeney, Marvin A. (2016). "Contemporary Jewish Readings of the Prophets". In Carolyn Sharp (ed.). The Oxford Handbook of the Prophets. Oxford University Press. ISBN 978-0-19-985956-6.
- Wells, John C. (1990). Longman Pronunciation Dictionary. Pearson Longman. ISBN 978-1-4058-8117-3.
- Wensinck, A. J. (1913–1936). "Jeremiah". In M. Th. Houtsma; T. W. Arnold; R. Basset; R. Hartmann (eds.). Encyclopaedia of Islam (1st ed.).
