= Ar-Rum =

30th chapter of the Qur'an

Surah 30 of the Quran
الروم Ar-Rum The Romans
- Qira'ah; English text
- Classification: Meccan
- Position: Juzʼ 21
- Hizb no.: 41
- No. of verses: 60
- No. of Rukus: 6
- No. of words: 817
- No. of letters: 3,472

Ar-Rum (Arabic: الروم, romanized: ’ar-rūm, lit. 'The Romans') is the 30th chapter (sūrah) of the Quran, consisting of 60 verses (āyāt). The term Rūm originated in the word Roman, and during the time of the Islamic prophet Muhammad, it referred to the Eastern Roman Empire.

The surah references the Byzantine–Sasanian War of 602–628 and specifically the Sasanian conquest of Jerusalem in 614. Both sides of that war would later become military opponents of the early Muslims. Within Muhammad's own lifetime, Muslim and Byzantine forces would clash in the earliest battle of the Arab–Byzantine wars, and the Muslim conquest of Persia led to the downfall of the Sasanian Empire by the middle of the 7th century.

== Summary ==
The chapter begins by noting the recent defeat of the Byzantine Empire to the Sasanian Empire in Jerusalem, near the Dead Sea. This defeat posed a significant theological and sociological problem for the early Muslim community because the Byzantines were Christians (considered to be "People of the Book" from the Islamic viewpoint) while the Sassanids who defeated them were Zoroastrians. Ar-Rum is in part a response to the non-Muslim Arab Meccans, who took the Sassanid victory as a sign that the traditional polytheistic practices would win out over the monotheism of the Abrahamic religions. In the third and fourth verses, the Muslim community is promised that the Byzantines will reverse their defeat into a victory and retake Jerusalem "in a few years' time".

"The Romans were vanquished in the closer region, and they, after being vanquished, will prevail within a certain number of years. To God belongs the command before and after. And that day, ones who believe will be glad with the help of God. He helps whom He wills. And He is The Almighty, The Compassionate."^{[Quran 30:2–5 (Translated by Laleh Bakhtiar)]}

Muslims believe this prophecy was fulfilled with Heraclius' campaign of 622, a Byzantine military counter-offensive that resulted in a crushing defeat for the Sassanids in Anatolia, and cite it as an example of the miraculous nature of the Quran.

== Āyāt ==
- 1–5 Prophecy concerning the ultimate triumph of the Romans over the Persians
- 6–7 God's power manifest in nature
- 8–9 The Quraysh heed not the warnings of God
- 10–12 The despair of the infidels in the resurrection
- 13–15 The righteous and the wicked shall be separated on the Day of Judgement
- 16–17 God to be worshipped at stated periods
- 18 The changes in nature a proof of the resurrection
- 19–26 Various signs of God's omnipotence
- 27–28 The idolaters convinced of folly by reference to their own customs
- 29–31 Muhammad exhorted to follow the orthodox faith and to avoid idolatry
- 32–35 The ingratitude of idolaters, who call on God in adversity but forget him in prosperity
- 36–38 Muslims exhorted to charity
- 39 The idols unable to create and preserve life
- 40–41 God's judgements follow man's iniquity
- 42 Exhortation to repentance before the judgment
- 42–44 The separation of the wicked and the just on Judgement Day; rewards and punishments
- 45 God's goodness in his providence a sign to men
- 46 Those who rejected the former prophets were punished
- 47–49 God's mercy manifest in his works
- 50 A blasting wind sufficient to harden the hearts of the unbelievers
- 51–52 Muhammad unable to make the deaf to hear or the blind to see
- 53 God the Creator
- 54–57 Believers and unbelievers on the resurrection day
- 58 The parables of the Quran rejected
- 59 Unbelievers are given over to blindness
- 60 Muhammad encouraged to steadfastness in the true religion

== Chronology ==
Regarding the timing and contextual background of the revelation (asbāb al-nuzūl), it is an earlier "Meccan surah", which means it is believed to have been revealed in Mecca, instead of later in Medina. Parts of Q30:38–50 are preserved in the Ṣan‘ā’1 lower text.

According to Theodor Nöldeke, the surah of ar-Rum was the second-to-last Meccan surah and the 84th surah chronologically; however, he argues its 17th ayah was revealed during the Medinan period. While the first ayah of the surah refers to the defeat of the Byzantine Empire at the hands of the Sasanian Empire near Damascus in the spring of 614.

According to al-Tabari, it refers to the Battle of Adhri'at in 614, but this battle is ignored in other sources.

== Literary units ==
In his tafsir, entitled "In the Shade of the Qur'an", Sayyid Qutb divides the surah into two halves, verses 1–32 and verses 33–60. Each section begins with an assertion of God's grace and mercy and ends with encouragement for Muhammad and his community.

First Section
"Signs to Reflect Upon"

- 30:1-6 "The Natural Bond of Faith" Notes the Byzantine defeat and prophesies a coming victory promised by God
- 30:1-5 "To Whom Power Belongs" Declares the truth of the universe
- 30:8-10 "Invitation to Reflect" Reminds the believers of the fates of other disobedient communities
- 30:11-16 "Two Divergent Wars" Describes the Last Judgment
- 30:17-27 "Scene of God's Glory", "The Cycle of Life and Death", and "Man and the Universe" Offers praise for God and all His powers and signs
- 30:28 "Analogy Drawn from Human Life" Uses a metaphor about slavery to condemn the sin of shirk
- 30:29-32 "Concluding Directive to Prophet" Urges the listeners to turn to the truth and resist dividing into sects

Second Section
"Bringing Life out of the Dead"

- 30:33-39 "Vacillating Conditions" Reassures the Muslim community of God's mercy and grace for true believers and offers suggestions for behavior like giving to the needy or avoiding usury
- 30:40-45 "Corruption and Pollution" Reminds people of the promise of resurrection at the Last Judgment and the fates of polytheist communities
- 30:47-54 "Aspects of God's Grace" Emphasizes resurrection as one of signs of God's mercy and grace when believers lose hope
- 30:52-57 "The Different Stages of Man's Life" Describes the weakness and folly of man and the fate of evildoers at the Last Judgment
- 30:58-59 "No Change of Position" Decries the nonbelievers who refuse to listen to Muhammad but asserts that God leads astray who he wills
- 30:60 Urges Muhammad and his community to persevere

== Major themes ==
The main theme of this surah is the contrast between monotheism and polytheism. In addition to making logical arguments against ascribing partners to God, several verses outline the differing fate for idolaters and believers. The unity of God is also emphasized with descriptions of the glory of God through illustrations of His wondrous signs and His miraculous creation. This means that the main lessons of this surah is not to make partners to Allah, and to always have the fate of a believer.

== Sample verse ==
Surah 30 includes a verse comparing the association of partners with God, which is the sin of shirk, to the relationship between a master and his slaves.

"He propounds a parable for you from yourselves. Have you—among those whom your right hands possessed—ascribed associates in what We provided you so that you share as equals and you fear them like your awe for each other? Thus, We explain distinctly the signs to a folk who are reasonable."^{[Quran 30:28 (Translated by Laleh Bakhtiar)]}
