= Uzair =

Figure mentioned in the Quran, Surah At-Tawba

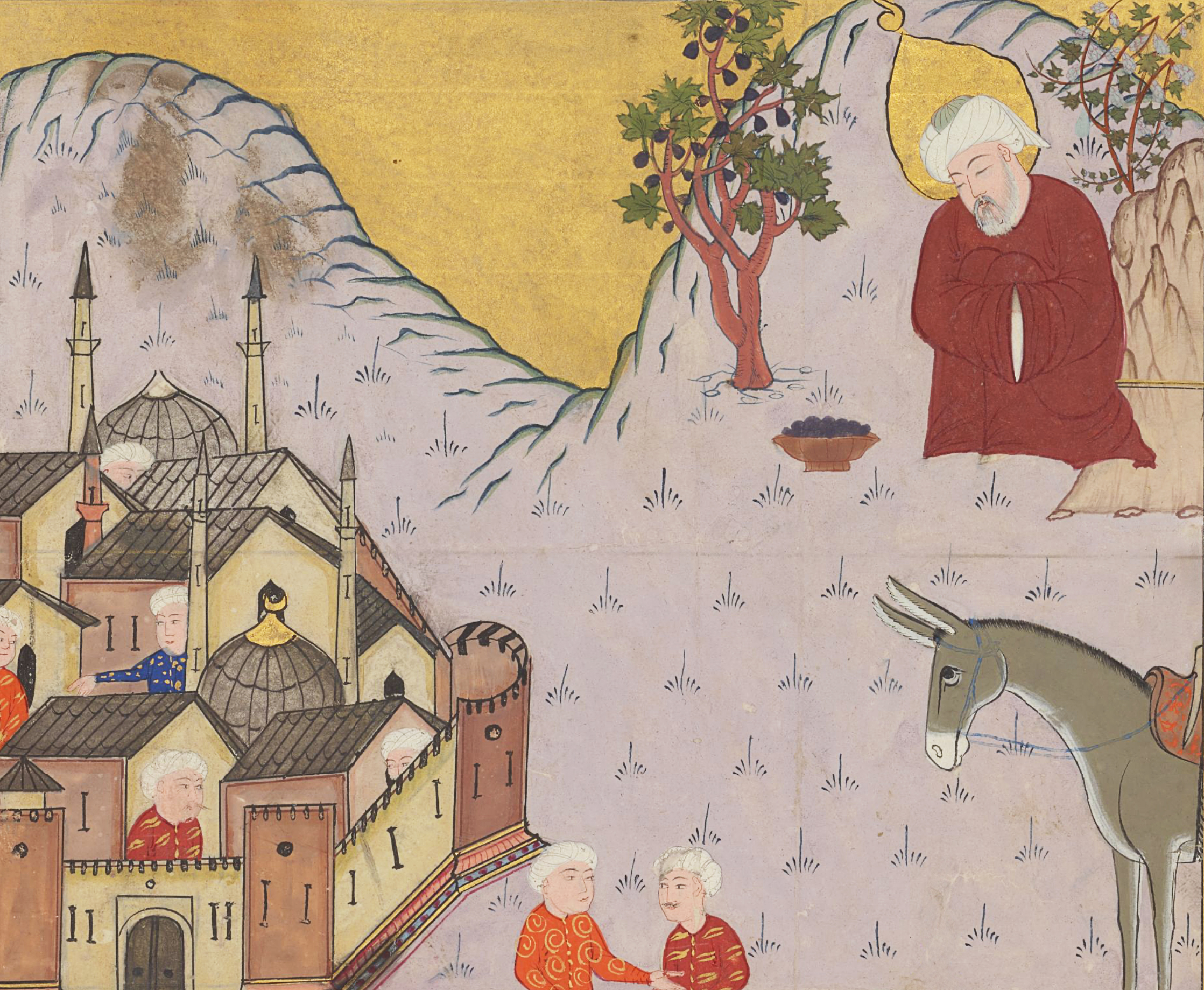
A late 16th-century Ottoman manuscript depicting Uzair asleep next to Jerusalem prior to its destruction

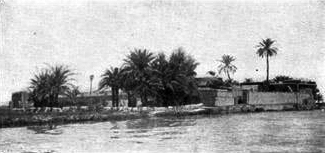
The site is traditionally described as the tomb of Uzair at Al-Uzayr near Basra.

Uzair (Arabic: عزير, romanized: ʿUzayr) is a figure who is mentioned in the Quran, Surah at-Tawbah, verse 9:30, which states that he was "revered by the Jews as the son of God". Uzair is most often identified with the biblical Ezra. Historians have described the reference as enigmatic since such views have not been found in Jewish sources. Islamic scholars have interpreted the Quranic reference in different ways, with some claiming that it alluded to a "specific group of Jews". A priest at the Aqsa compound also named Uzair is also said to have been in some commentaries to be the person who is identified as the protagonist in the Parable of the Hamlet in Ruins in surah Baqara (2:259).

Hythem Sidky and Holger Zellentin identified Uzayr as Eliezer ben Hurcanus, one of the most prominent Rabbinic sages of the Mishnah. Additionally, Ibn Ishaq's biography of the Islamic prophet Muhammad describes that some Jews of Medina believed that Uzayr was the son of God, and that the Quranic revelation relates to that belief.

According to Ibn Kathir, Uzair lived between the times of Sulaiman and the time of Zakariya, father of John the Baptist. Some Quranic commentators viewed Uzayr as a learned scholar who sought to teach the people the forgotten laws of God. Some Islamic scholars held Uzayr to be one of the prophets. Although there is a hadith that reports that God expunged Uzair from the list of prophets because he refused to believe in predestination, this hadith is considered da'if (weak) and is rejected by most Islamic scholars.

Ibn Hazm, al-Samawal al-Maghribi and other scholars put forth the view that Uzair or one of his disciples falsified the Torah and this claim became a common theme in Islamic polemics against the Bible. Many aspects of later Islamic narratives show similarity to Vision of Ezra, an apocryphal text which seems to have been partially known to Muslim readers. Classical Muslim scholars who were aware of Jewish and Christian denials of belief in Ezra explained that it was only one Jew or a small group of Jews who worshipped Uzayr, or that the verse refers to the extreme admiration of Jews for their rabbis. Many classical Muslim scholars suggest that the description of Ezra as the son of God does not mean the same as it does for Christians in Jesus Christ, but rather it means the same as the son of God as used in Judaism, and that the Qur’anic verse rejects the use of the term “son of God.” In Islam, the use of the term “son of God” is completely forbidden, considering it a lie against God, as mentioned in the verse 18:4-5

Authors of the 1906 Jewish Encyclopedia viewed the Quranic reference as a "malevolent metaphor" for the reverence accorded to Ezra in Judaism. Some modern historians have favored the theory that a Jewish sect in Arabia venerated Ezra to the extent of deifying him. Gordon Darnell Newby has suggested that the Quranic expression may have reflected Ezra's possible designation as one of the Sons of God by Jews of the Hijaz.

Other scholars proposed emendations of the received spelling of the name, leading to readings ‘Uzayl (Azazel), ‘Azīz, or ‘Azariah (Abednego).

== Quranic and hadith context ==
The Quran states that Jews exalted Ezra as a son of God:

The Jews say, “Ezra is the son of God,” while the Christians say, “Christ is the son of God.” Such are their baseless assertions, only parroting the words of earlier disbelievers. May God condemn them! How can they be deluded ˹from the truth˺?

In February 624, when the qibla (direction of prayer) changed from Jerusalem to Mecca. Sallam ibn Mishkam, a Jew who lived in Medina and his friends asked Muhammad: “How can we follow you when you have abandoned our qibla and you do not allege that Uzair (Ezra) is the son of God?” This verse is situated in a context of theological disputes with the Jewish community of Medina. The Quran emphasizes the absolute divinity of God and warns against associating any being with him (shirk). It further condemns Jewish and Christian leaders of the time for deceiving the masses into taking "their priests and their anchorites to be their lords in derogation of God". In casting doubt on claims about the divine status of Uzayr and Christ, the Quran also instructs Muslims to reject such beliefs. These arguments reflect the tensions between the Muslim, Christian and Jewish communities of Arabia.

== Islamic tradition and literature ==
In some Islamic texts, Ezra is identified as the person mentioned in Qur'an 2:259:

Or ˹are you not aware of˺ the one who passed by a city which was in ruins. He wondered, “How could God bring this back to life after its destruction?” So God caused him to die for a hundred years then brought him back to life. God asked, “How long have you remained ˹in this state˺?” He replied, “Perhaps a day or part of a day.” God said, “No! You have remained here for a hundred years! Just look at your food and drink—they have not spoiled. ˹But now˺ look at ˹the remains of˺ your donkey! And ˹so˺ We have made you into a sign for humanity. And look at the bones ˹of the donkey˺, how We bring them together then clothe them with flesh!” When this was made clear to him, he declared, “˹Now˺ I know that God is Most Capable of everything.”

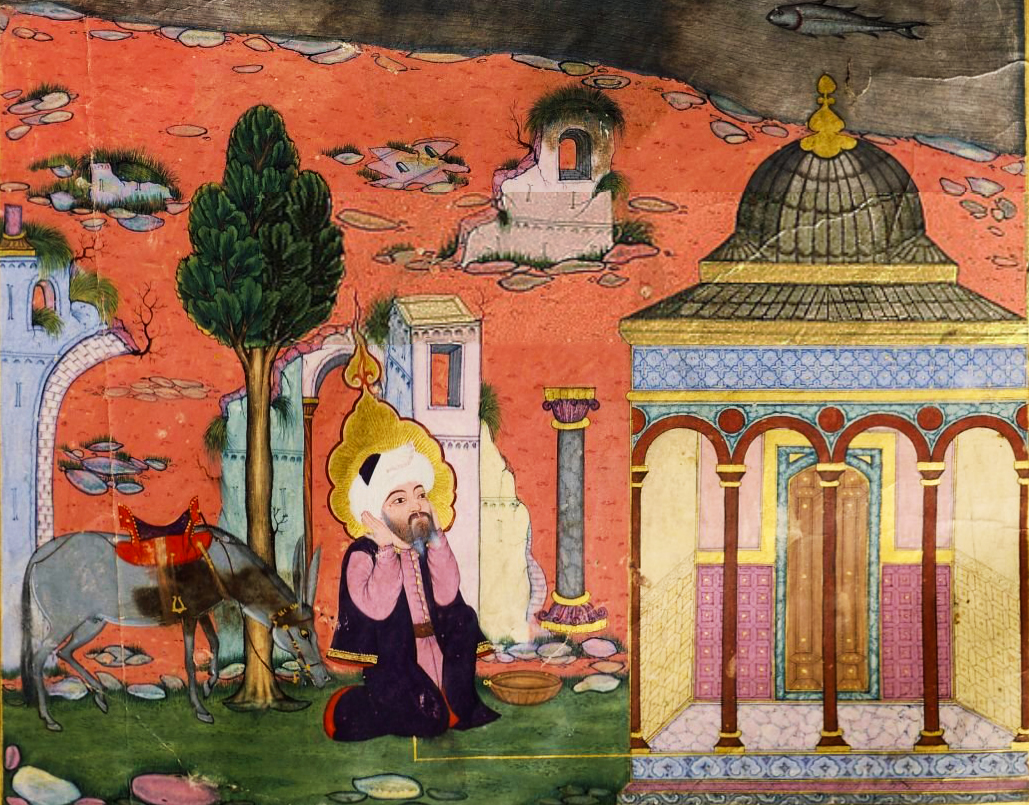
Uzair awakened after the destruction of Jerusalem. Zubdat-al Tawarikh.

The history text Zubdat-al Tawarikh, dedicated to Ottoman sultan Murad III in 1583, narrates a story of Uzair's grief for the destruction of Jerusalem. His grief is said to have been so great that God took his soul and brought him back to life after Jerusalem was reconstructed. In the miniature accompanying the manuscript, the building on the lower right depicts the rebuilt city of Jerusalem in the form a typical sixteenth-century Ottoman building with a dome and an arched portico. The former ruins of Jerusalem are alluded to by the broken arches and columns on the left.

According to the classical Quranic exegete Ibn Kathir, after Ezra questioned how the resurrection will take place on the Day of Judgment, God had him brought back to life many years after he died. He rode on his revived donkey and entered his native place. But the people did not recognize him, nor did his household, except the maid, who was now an old blind woman. He prayed to God to cure her blindness and she could see again. He meets his son who recognized him by a mole between his shoulders and was older than he was. Ezra then led the people to locate the only surviving copy of Torah as the remaining were burnt by Nebuchadnezzar. It was rotting and crumpled, so Ezra had a new copy of the Torah made which he had previously memorized. He thus renovated the Torah to the Israelites. Ibn Kathir mentions that the sign in the phrase "And that We may make of thee a sign unto the people" was that he was younger than his children. After this miracle, Ibn Kathir writes that Jews began to claim that Ezra was the 'son of God'.

The modern Quranic exegesis of Abul A'la Maududi states:

Uzair (Ezra) lived during the period around 450 B.C. The Jews regarded him with great reverence as the revivalist of their Scriptures which had been lost during their captivity in Babylon after the death of Prophet Solomon. So much so that they had lost all the knowledge of their Law, their traditions and of Hebrew, their national language. Then it was Ezra who re-wrote the Old Testament and revived the Law. That is why they used very exaggerated language in his reverence which misled some of the Jewish sects to make him 'the son of God'. The Qur'an, however, does not assert that all the Jews were unanimous in declaring Ezra as 'the son of God'. What it intends to say is that the perversion in the articles of faith of the Jews concerning God had degenerated to such an extent that there were some amongst them who considered Ezra as the son of God.

According to the Ahmadiyya Muhammad Ali's Quranic commentary, there indeed existed a group of Jews who venerated Ezra as the son of God. According to Ali, al-Qastallani held that in the Kitan al-Nikah there was a party of Jews who held this belief.

=== Alleged falsification of scripture ===
Ibn Hazm, an Andalusian Muslim scholar, explicitly accused Ezra of being a liar and a heretic who falsified and added interpolations into the Biblical text. Ibn Hazm provided a polemical list of what he considered "chronological and geographical inaccuracies and contradictions; theological impossibilities (anthropomorphic expressions, stories of fornication and whoredom, and the attributing of sins to prophets), as well as lack of reliable transmission (tawatur) of the text", Hava Lazarus-Yafeh states. In response to attacks on the personality of Ezra, the Byzantine emperor Leo III defended Ezra as a pious, reliable person. The Jewish convert to Islam al-Samaw'al (d. 1175) accused Ezra of interpolating stories such as Lot's daughters to sully David's origins and to prevent the rule of the Davidic line during the Second Temple period. The writings of ibn Hazm and al-Samaw'al were adopted and updated only slightly by later Muslim authors up to contemporary times.

== Historical analysis ==
In A History of the Jews of Arabia: From Ancient Times to Their Eclipse under Islam, scholar Gordon Darnell Newby notes the following on the topic of Uzair, the angel Metatron and the Bene Elohim (lit. "Sons of God"):

...we can deduce that the inhabitants of Hijaz during Muhammad's time knew portions, at least, of 3 Enoch in association with the Jews. The angels over which Metatron becomes chief are identified in the Enoch traditions as the sons of God, the Bene Elohim, the Watchers, the fallen ones as the causer of the flood. In 1 Enoch, and 4 Ezra, the term Son of God can be applied to the Messiah, but most often it is applied to the righteous men, of whom Jewish tradition holds there to be no more righteous than the ones God elected to translate to heaven alive. It is easy, then, to imagine that among the Jews of the Hijaz who were apparently involved in mystical speculations associated with the merkabah, Ezra, because of the traditions of his translation, because of his piety, and particularly because he was equated with Enoch as the Scribe of God, could be termed one of the Bene Elohim. And, of course, he would fit the description of religious leader (one of the ahbar of the Qur'an 9:31) whom the Jews had exalted. In the Second Syriac Esdras, Ezra is called the scribe of the knowledge of the Most High.

Also per The Concise Encyclopaedia Of Islam there seem to have been some Jews in pre-Islamic Arabia that equated Ezra with Enoch and said that Enoch was assumed into Heaven stripped of his humanity and transformed into Metatron

Mark Lidzbarski and Michael Lodahl have also hypothesized existence of an Arabian Jewish sect whose veneration of Ezra bordered on deification.

The 1906 Jewish Encyclopedia states:

"In the Koran (ix. 30) the Jews are charged with worshiping Ezra ("'Uzair") as the son of God—a malevolent metaphor for the great respect which was paid by the Jews to the memory of Ezra as the restorer of the Law, and from which the Ezra legends of apocryphal literature (II Esd. xxxiv. 37-49) originated (as to how they developed in Mohammedan legends see Damiri, "Ḥayat al-Ḥayawan," i. 304-305). It is hard to bring into harmony with this the fact, related by Jacob Saphir ("Eben Sappir," i. 99), that the Jews of South Arabia have a pronounced aversion for the memory of Ezra, and even exclude his name from their category of proper names."

The Egyptian translator and critic Ibrahim Awad says:

Al-Jahiz mentioned that a group of the remnants of those who believed that Ezra was the son of God were still in his time in Yemen, Syria, and within the lands of the Romans. Ibn Hazm mentioned that those who said that were the Sadducees sect in Yemen. There were arguments of this kind between him and Jew Ibn al-Ghazala, so why did he not accuse him of lying when he said that a group of his co-religionists believed that Ezra was the son of God?

The Shorter Jewish Encyclopedia says that the saying of Uzair son of God, may be an oral tradition of the Jews of Yemen and linked to the Book of Second Esdras. Hirschberg suggested that some Yemenite Jews called Ezra the son of God because they believed that Ezra was the Messiah.

=== Alternative readings of the name ===
==== Eliezer ====
Al-Samawal al-Maghribi, a Moroccan Jew who converted to Islam in 1163 CE, read the name as Eliezer; he mentioned this in his Ifham al Yahud. Moshe Perlmann translates:

"This Ezra is not al-Uzayr as people think. For al-Uzayr is the Arabic for Elazar (Eliezer). [But] the name Ezra would not change in translation to Arabic at all for it is a name whose vowels and consonants fit [the Arabic]."

Hythem Sidky and Holger Zellentin view the name Uzair as the Arabic rendering of the Hebrew name "Eliezer" borrowed via phonosemantic matching. They propose that the Quran is referring to Rabbi Eliezer ben Hurcanus, and this proposition is supported by the context of the verse, as well as intertextual evidence. In Moed Katan 3:1 of the Jerusalem Talmud, the Bat Kol refers to Rabbi Eliezer as 'My son' while affirming his legal position:

"There came an unembodied voice and said, practice follows My son Eliezer."

==== Other speculations ====
Some scholars proposed emendations of the received spelling of the name, عزير.

Paul Casanova and Steven M. Wasserstrom read the name as ‘Uzayl (عزيل), a variant of Asael (Enoch 6:8) or ‘Azazel (Leviticus 16:8), who is identified as the leader of the fallen angels called "sons of God" in Genesis 6:2. J. Finkel instead reads the name as ‘Azīz (عزيز, potentate), connecting it to the phrase "thou art my son" in Psalms 2:7. Viviane Comerro considers the possibility of Quranic Uzair not being Ezra but Azariah instead, relying on Ibn Qutaybah, and identifying a confusion committed by Muslim exegetes. She declares : "There is, from Muslim traditionalists, a confusion between two distinct characters, Ezra ['Azrà] et Azariah ['Azarya(h)](...) Thus, it is possible that the quranic vocable Uzayr could find its origin in Azariah's one."

== See also ==
- Elijah
- Sandalphon
- Henoch
- Metatron
