= Tawhid =

Core Islamic tenet denoting the unification of God

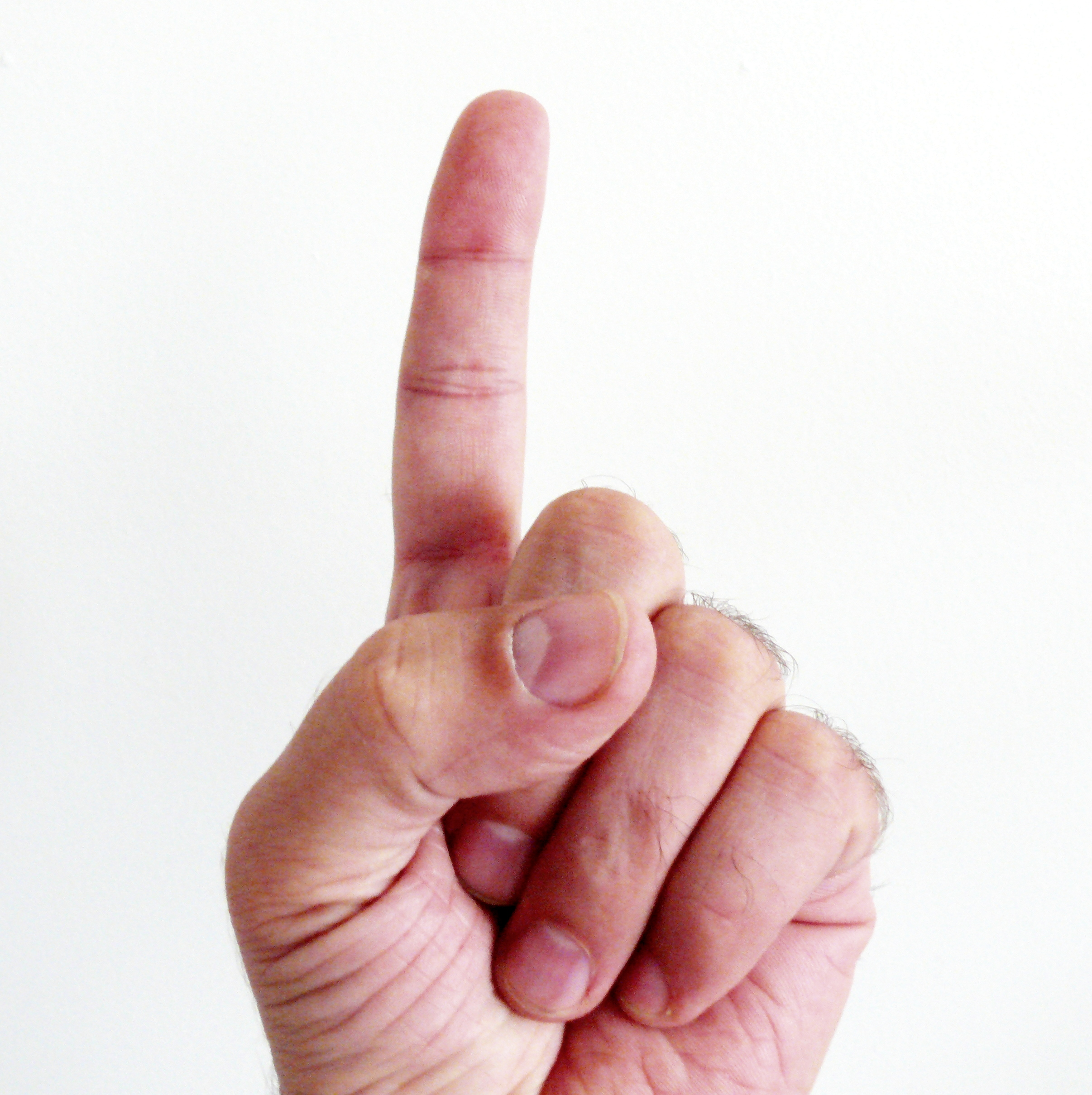
Muslims use the single raised index finger gesture (al-sabbaba or al-sabbaha) as a symbol of tawhid.

Tawhid, (Note: Also romanized as tawheed, tauhid, tauheed and tevhid) (Note: Arabic: تَوْحِيد, romanized: tawḥīd, lit. 'oneness [of God]') literally "Oneness" or "to make one", refers to the principle of monotheism, in that case is Islam's single most important and central concept, upon which a Muslim's entire religious adherence rests. It unequivocally holds that God (Allāh) is indivisibly one (ahad) and single (wahid). Tawhid constitutes the foremost article of the Muslim profession of submission. The first part of the Islamic declaration of faith (shahada) is the declaration of belief in the oneness of God. To attribute divinity to anything or anyone else is considered shirk, which is an unpardonable sin unless repented afterwards, according to the Quran. Muslims believe that the entirety of the Islamic teaching rests on the principle of tawhid.

From an Islamic standpoint, there is an uncompromising monotheism at the heart of the Islamic beliefs (aqida) that is seen as distinguishing Islam from other major religions.

The Quran teaches the existence of a single and absolute truth that transcends the world, a unique, independent and indivisible being that is independent of all of creation. God, according to Islam, is a universal God, rather than a local, tribal or parochial one and is an absolute that integrates all.

Islamic intellectual history can be understood as a gradual unfolding of the manner in which successive generations of believers have understood the meaning and implications of professing tawhid. Islamic scholars have different approaches toward understanding it. Islamic scholastic theology, jurisprudence, philosophy, Sufism, and even the Islamic understanding of natural sciences to some degree, all seek to explain at some level the principle of tawhid.

Chapter 112 of the Quran, titled al-Ikhlas, reads:

قُلْ هُوَ ٱللَّهُ أَحَدٌ
ٱللَّهُ ٱلصَّمَدُ
لَمْ يَلِدْ وَلَمْ يُولَدْ
وَلَمْ يَكُن لَّهُۥ كُفُوًا أَحَدٌۢ

Translation:

Say, He is Allah—One;
Allah—the Sustainer.
He has never had offspring, nor was He born.
And there is none comparable to Him.

== Etymology ==
The word 'tawhid' (توحيد), which means "assertion or declaration of oneness (of God)", is derived from the Arabic verb 'wahhada' (وحد), which can have a causative meaning, "to make one, to unite", or a descriptive meaning, "to consider to be one, to see as one". This term signifies the belief in absolute oneness and uniqueness of God. This reflects the struggle of monotheism against polytheism.

== Name of God in Islam ==
In order to explain the complexity of the unity of God and of the divine nature, the Quran uses 99 terms, which are referred to as "Excellent Names of God" (7:180). The divine names project divine attributes, which in turn project all the levels of the creation down to the physical plane. Aside from the supreme name Allah and the neologism ar-Rahman (referring to the divine beneficence that creates and maintains the universe) and a few other specific names like Malik al-Muluk ("King of Kings") in an authentic narration of Muhammad, other names may be shared by both God and human beings. According to Islamic teachings, the latter is meant to serve as a reminder of God's immanence, rather than being a sign of one's divinity or, alternatively, imposing a limitation on God's transcendent nature. Attribution of divinity to a created entity, shirk, is considered a denial of the truth of God and thus is a major sin.

== Shirk ==
Associating partners in divinity of God is known as shirk and is the antithesis of tawhid. Although the term is usually translated as "polytheism" into English, it is thought to be more complex. Alternatively, the translation 'associating [with God]' has been suggested. The term includes denial of attributing any form of divinity to any other thing but God, which includes the self by elevating oneself above others and associating attributes of God with a created being. That has caused Sunni scholars to accuse Salafis and Wahhabis of depicting God as a created object ruling from the sky.

Shirk is classified into two categories:

- al-Shirk al-akbar (Arabic: شِرْك ٱلْأَكْبَر, romanized: shirk al-akbar; lit. 'greater shirk'): open and apparent
- al-shirk al-khafi; lit. 'hidden shirk'): concealed or hidden. It is when people perform the necessary rituals but not for God but for the sake of others, including social recognition. Hidden shirk might be unwitting, yet punishable, although to a lesser extent than greater forms of shirk.

Chapter 4, verse 48, of the Quran reads:

Indeed, Allah does not forgive associating others with Him ˹in worship˺, but forgives anything else of whoever He wills. And whoever associates others with Allah has indeed committed a grave sin.

— Surah An-Nisa 4:48

Chapter 4, verse 116, of the Quran reads:

Surely Allah does not forgive associating ˹others˺ with Him ˹in worship˺, but forgives anything else of whoever He wills. Indeed, whoever associates ˹others˺ with Allah has clearly gone far astray.

— Surah An-Nisa 4:116

== Discerning unity of God ==
According to Hossein Nasr, Ali, the first imam (Shia view) and fourth Rashid Caliph (Sunni view), is credited with having established Islamic theology. His quotations contain the first rational proofs among Muslims of the Unity of God.

Ali states that "God is One" means that God is away from likeness and numeration, and he is not divisible even in imagination.

The first step of religion is to accept, understand and realize him as the Lord... The correct form of belief in his unity is to realize that he is so absolutely pure and above nature that nothing can be added to or subtracted from his being. That is, one should realize that there is no difference between his person and his attributes, and his attributes should not be differentiated or distinguished from his person.

Vincent J. Cornell, a scholar of Islamic studies quotes the following statement from Ali:

To know God is to know his unification. To say that God is one has four meanings: two of them are false and two are correct. As for the two meanings that are false, one is that a person should say "God is one" and be thinking of a number and counting. This is false because that which has no second cannot enter into the category of number. Do you not see that those who say that God is a third of a trinity fall into this infidelity? Another meaning is to say, "So-and-So is one of his people", namely, a species of this genus or a member of this species. This meaning is also false when applied to God, because it implies likening something to God, whereas God is above all likeness. As to the two meanings that are correct when applied to God, one is that it should be said that "God is one" in the sense that there is no likeness to him among things. Another is to say that "God is one" in the sense that there is no multiplicity or division conceivable in Him, neither outwardly, nor in the mind, nor in the imagination. God alone possesses such a unity.

The perception of tawhid laid the foundation of Muslim ethics. According to Islam, the world is sustained by God as the ultimate reality, unique in his attributes, distinct from everything else. Tawhid denies any affinity between the creator and its creation. That includes that invisible entities (jinn) do not partake in creation but are created, rejection of an avatar or offspring of God, or a partner in creation in form of a sibling or consort. The uniqueness of the creator is expressed in the Daily Prayer's (ṣalāh) phrase Allāhu ʾakbar (Takbīr).

== Arguments for Oneness of God ==
=== Theological ===
Theologians usually use reason and deduction to prove the existence, unity and oneness of God. They use a teleological argument for the existence of God as a creator based on perceived evidence of order, purpose, design or direction or some combination of them in nature. Teleology is the supposition that there is a purpose or directive principle in the works and processes of nature.

Another argument that is used frequently by theologians is reductio ad absurdum, which they use instead of positive arguments as a more efficient way to reject their opponent's ideas.

=== God as cause of causes ===
Against the polytheism of pre-Islamic Arabia, the Quran argues that the knowledge of God as the creator of everything rules out the possibility of lesser gods since these beings must be themselves created. For the Quran, God is an immanent and transcendent deity who actively creates, maintains and destroys the universe. The reality of God as the ultimate cause of things is the belief that God is veiled from human understanding because of the secondary causes and contingent realities of things in the world. Thus, the belief in the oneness of God is equated in the Quran with the "belief in the unseen" (2:3). The Quran summarises its task in making the "unseen" become, to a greater or lesser degree, "seen" so that belief in the existence of God becomes a master truth, rather than an unreasonable belief. The Quran states that God's signals are so near and yet so far, demanding that its students listen to what it has to say with humility (50:33, 50:37). The Quran draws attention to certain observable facts to present them as "reminders" of God, instead of providing lengthy "theological" proofs for the existence and unity of God.

Ash'ari theologians rejected cause and effect in essence but accepted it as something that facilitates humankind's investigation and comprehension of natural processes. The medieval scholars argued that nature was composed of uniform atoms that were "recreated" at every instant by God. The laws of nature were only the customary sequence of apparent causes (customs of God), the ultimate cause of each accident being God himself. Other forms of the argument also appear in Avicenna's other works, and the argument became known as the Proof of the Truthful.

Avicenna initiated a full-fledged inquiry into the question of being in which he distinguished between essence (Mahiat) and existence (Wujud). He argued that the fact of existence may not be inferred from or accounted for by the essence of existing things and that form and matter by themselves cannot interact and originate the movement of the universe or the progressive actualization of existing things. Existence must, therefore, be caused by an agent-cause that necessitates, imparts, gives, or adds existence to an essence.

=== God as necessary existent ===
An ontological argument for the existence of God was first proposed by Avicenna (965–1037) in the Metaphysics section of The Book of Healing. Other forms of the argument also appear in Avicenna's other works, and the argument became known as the Proof of the Truthful. Avicenna initiated a full-fledged inquiry into the question of being, in which he distinguished between essence (Mahiat) and existence (Wujud). He argued that the fact of existence can not be inferred from or accounted for by the essence of existing things and that form and matter by themselves cannot interact and originate the movement of the universe or the progressive actualization of existing things. Existence must, therefore, be caused by an agent-cause that necessitates, imparts, gives or adds existence to an essence. To do so, the cause must be an existing thing and co-exist with its effect.

That was the first attempt at using the method of a priori proof, which uses intuition and reason alone. Avicenna's proof of God's existence is unique in that it can be classified as both a cosmological argument and an ontological argument. "It is ontological insofar as 'necessary existence' in intellect is the first basis for arguing for a Necessary Existent". The proof is also "cosmological insofar as most of it is taken up with arguing that contingent existence cannot stand alone and must end up in a Necessary Existent". Another argument Avicenna presented for God's existence was the problem of the mind–body dichotomy.

According to Avicenna, the universe consists of a chain of actual beings, each giving existence to the one below it and responsible for the existence of the rest of the chain below. Because an actual infinite is deemed impossible by Avicenna, the chain as a whole must terminate in a being that is wholly simple and one, whose essence is its very existence and therefore is self-sufficient and does not need something else to give it existence. Because its existence is not contingent on or necessitated by something else but is necessary and eternal in itself, it satisfies the condition of being the necessitating cause of the entire chain that constitutes the eternal world of contingent existing things. Thus, his ontological system rests on the conception of God as the Wajib al-Wujud (necessary existent). There is a gradual multiplication of beings through a timeless emanation from God as a result of his self-knowledge.

=== Indivisibility of God's sovereignty ===
The Quran argues that there can be no multiple sources of divine sovereignty since "behold, each god would have taken away what [each] had created, And some would have Lorded it over others!" The Quran argues that the stability and order prevailing throughout the universe shows that it was created and is being administered by only one God (28:70-72).

The Quran in verse 21:22 states, "Had there been within them [i.e., the heavens and earth] gods besides Allāh, they both would have been ruined". Later Muslim theologians elaborated on the verse by saying that the existence of at least two gods would inevitably arise between them, at one time or another, a conflict of wills. Since two contrary wills could not possibly be realized at the same time, one of them must admit himself powerless in that particular instance. On the other hand, a powerless being can not by definition be a god. Therefore, the possibility of having more than one god is ruled out. For if a god is powerful above another, that asserts a difference in the particular attributes that are confined to the essence of godhood, which implies the lesser god must lack in certain necessary attributes, which make the deity as anthropomorphic and snatches the title of god away from that entity.

=== Other arguments ===
The Quran argues that human beings have an instinctive distaste for polytheism. At times of crisis, for example, even the idolaters forget the false deities and call upon the one true God for help. As soon as they are relieved from the danger, however, they start associating other beings with God. "If they happen to be aboard a ship 'caught in a storm', they cry out to Allah ˹alone˺ in sincere devotion. But as soon as He delivers them 'safely' to shore, they associate 'others with Him once again'." (29:65).

Next, the Quran argues that polytheism takes away from human dignity. God has honoured human beings and given them charge of the physical world, yet they disgrace their position in the world by worshipping what they carve out with their own hands.

Lastly, the Quran argues that monotheism is not a later discovery made by the human race but rather that there is the combined evidence of the prophetic call for monotheism throughout human history that started from Adam. The Quran suggests several causes for deviation from monotheism to polytheism since a significant temporal power, which is regarded by the holder and his subjects as 'absolute', may lead the holder to think that he is God-like. Such claims were commonly forced upon and accepted by those who were subject to the ruler. Also, certain natural phenomena (such as the sun, the moon and the stars) inspire feelings of awe, wonder or admiration that could lead some to regard these celestial bodies as deities. Another reason for deviating from monotheism is one becoming a slave to one's base desires and passions. In seeking to always satisfy the desires, one may commit a kind of polytheism.

== Interpretations ==
Understanding of the meaning of "tawhid" is one of the most controversial issues for Muslims. Islamic scholars have different approaches toward understanding it, comprising textualistic approach, theological approach, philosophical approach, and the Sufi and Irfani approach. These different approaches lead to different and in some cases opposite understanding of the issue.

=== Theological viewpoints ===
Certain theologians use the term "tawhid" in a much broader meaning to denote the totality of discussion of God, his existence and his various attributes. Others go yet further and use the term to ultimately represent the totality of the "principles of religion". In its current usage, the expressions "tawhid" or "knowledge of tawhid" are sometimes used as equivalents for the whole Kalam, Islamic theology.

According to Sunni Islam, the orthodox understanding of theology is taken directly from the teachings of Muhammad with the understanding and methodology of his companions, sourced directly from the revealed scripture the Quran; being the main information source for understanding the unification of God in Islam. All Muslim authorities maintain that a true understanding of God is impossible unless he introduces himself because the fact that God is beyond the range of human vision and senses. Therefore, God tells people who he is by speaking through the prophets. According to that view, the fundamental message of all of the prophets is: "There is no god worthy of worship except Allah (avoiding the false gods as stated in Surah hud)".

==== Atharism and Hanbalites ====
The approach of textual interpretation in Islam is to avoid delving into theological speculation and kalam.

'Abdullah al-Ansari al-Herawi was a Hanbalite scholar who sought to reform sufistic interpretations in accordance with the salaf (al-salaf al-saleh). According to al-Herawi, tawhid consists of transcending Allah from contingent being. Al-Herawi distinguishes between three stage of tawhid: the first is for the common people, the second is for the privileged ones, and the third, for the privileged from among the privileged.

==== Mu'tazili school ====
The Mu'tazilis liked to call themselves the people of the tawhid (ahl al-tawhid). In Maqalat al-Islamiyin, Abu al-Hasan al-Ash'ari describes the Mu'tazilite conception of the tawhid as follows:

God is unique, nothing is like him; he is neither body, nor individual, nor substance, nor accident. He is beyond time. He cannot dwell in a place or within a being; he is not the object of any creatural attribute or qualification. He is neither conditioned nor determined, neither engendered nor engendering. He is beyond the perception of the senses. The eyes cannot see him, observation cannot attain him, the imagination cannot comprehend him. He is a thing, but he is not like other things; he is omniscient, all-powerful, but his omniscience and his all-mightiness cannot be compared to anything created. He created the world without any pre-established archetype and without an auxiliary.

According to Henry Corbin, the result of that interpretation is the negation of the divine attributes, the affirmation of the created Quran and the denial of all possibility of the vision of God in the world beyond. Mu'tazilis believed that God is deprived of all positive attributes, in the sense that all divine qualifications must be understood as being the essence itself, and declared that God is existing ubiquitously and in everything. They resorted to metaphorical interpretations of Quranic verses or Prophetic reports with seemingly anthropomorphic content. For example, the hand is the metaphorical designation of power; the face signifies the essence and the fact that God is seated on the Throne is a metaphorical image of the divine reign.

==== Ash'ari school ====
The solution proposed by Abu al-Hasan al-Ash'ari to solve the problems of tashbih and ta'til concedes that the divine Being possesses in a real sense the Attributes and Names mentioned in the Quran. Insofar as those names and attributes have a positive reality, they are distinct from the essence, but nevertheless they do not have either existence or reality apart from it. The inspiration of al-Ash'ari in this matter was on the one hand to distinguish essence and attribute as concepts, and on the other hand to see that the duality between essence and attribute should be situated not on the quantitative but on the qualitative level, which Mu'tazilis thinking had failed to grasp.

Ash'ari theology, which dominated Sunni Islam from the 13th to the 19th centuries, insists on the ultimate divine transcendence and holds that divine unity is not accessible to human reason. Ash'arism teaches that human knowledge regarding it is limited to what has been revealed through the prophets, and on such questions as God's creation of evil and the apparent anthropomorphism of God's attributes, revelation must be accepted bila kayfa (without [asking] how).

==== Twelver theology ====
Twelver theology is based on the Hadith which have been narrated from the Islamic prophet Muhammad, the first, fifth, sixth, seventh and eighth Imams and compiled by Shia scholars such as Al-Shaykh al-Saduq in al-Tawhid. According to Shia theologians, the attributes and names of God have no independent and hypostatic existence apart from the being and essence of God. Any suggestion of the attributes and names being conceived of as separate is thought to entail polytheism. It would be incorrect to say even that God knows by his knowledge, which is in his essence, but God knows by his knowledge, which is his essence. Also, God has no physical form, and he is imperceptible.

Twelvers believe God is alone in being, along with his names, his attributes, his actions and his theophanies. The totality of being therefore is he, passes through him, comes from him and returns to him. God is not a being next to or above other beings, his creatures. He is being, the absolute act of being (wujud mutlaq). If there were being other than he (i.e., creatural being), God would no longer be the Unique: the only one to be. As this Divine Essence is infinite, his qualities are the same as his essence, Essentially there is one Reality which is one and indivisible. The border between theoretical tawhid and shirk is to know that every reality and being in its essence, attributes and action are from him (from Him-ness), it is tawhid. Every supernatural action of the prophets is by God's permission as Quran points to it. The border between the tawhid and shirk in practice is to assume something as an end in itself, independent from God, not as a road to God (to Him-ness).

==== Salafism and Wahhabism ====
Later Hanbalites, such as the proto-Salafi ibn Taimiyya largely ignored the works of their predecessors, thus laying the foundation of a new religious formulation as a normative theory on tawhid.

Additional to the first meaning of tawhid (Rubūbīyah (Lordship)), on which all Sunnis agree, Salafism holds two additional meanings: Al-Asma wa's-Sifat (names and attributes) and Al-'Ibadah (worship) or Al-Uluhiyah (worth of worship). Al-Asma wa's-Sifat includes lordship in the form of a legislator. Salafis consider that as legislation that is not based on (their own) interpretation of sharia to be a form of polytheism. Al-'Ibadah is furthermore understood to mean that everyday acts must be in accordance with sharia. Doing something else would imply accepting an authority or object of desire other than God.

The Salafi specific features of tawhid tend to elide the sovereignty and uniqueness of God. For this reason, other Sunnis disagree with these two features, as they regard it as comparing God to a created object ascribed some power to.

=== Philosophical viewpoints ===
Al-Farabi, Al-Razi and especially Avicenna put forward an interpretation of Tawhid in light of reason, with the Quran and Hadith serving as a basis. Before Avicenna, discussions among Muslim philosophers had been about the unity of God as divine creator and his relationship with the world as creation. The earlier philosophers were profoundly affected by the emphasis of Plotinus on divine simplicity.

=== Sufi and Irfani viewpoint ===
In Islamic mysticism (Sufism and Irfan), Tawhid is the affirmation in speech of God's unity but also and just as importantly a practical and existential realization of that unity. That is done by rejecting the concepts tied to the world of multiplicity, to isolate the eternal from the temporal in a practical way. The ideal is a radical purification from all worldliness. According to Vincent J. Cornall, it is possible to draw up a monist image of God (see Sufi metaphysics) by describing the reality as a unified whole, with God being a single concept that would describe or ascribe all existing things: "He is the First and the Last, the Evident and the Immanent: and He has full knowledge of all things."(57:3)" However many Muslims criticize monism for it blurs the distinction between the creator and the creature, something incompatible with the genuine and absolute monotheism of Islam.

For Muslim mystics (sufis), the affirmation in speech of God's unity is only the first step of tawhid. Further steps involve a spiritual experience for the existential realization of that unity. Categorizations of different steps of tawhid may be found in the works of Muslims Sufis like Junayd Baghdadi and al-Ghazali. It involves a practical rejection of the concepts tied to the world of multiplicity. Al-Junayd for example "distinguishes four steps, starting from the simple attestation of unicity which is sufficient for ordinary believers, and culminating in the highest rank reserved for the elite, when the creature totally ceases to exist before his Lord, thus achieving al-fanā fi al-tawhīd [annihilation in unity]".

==== Annihilation and subsistence ====
According to the concept of Fana, Annihilation and Subsistence, "Man's existence, or ego, or self-hood... must be annihilated so that he can attain to his true self which is his existence and "subsistence" with God. All of man's character traits and habits, everything that pertains to his individual existence must become completely naughted and "obliterated" (mahw). Then God will give back to him his character traits and everything positive he ever possessed. But at this stage, he will know consciously and actually—not just theoretically—and with a thorough spiritual realization, that everything he is derives absolutely from God. He is nothing but a ray of God's Attributes manifesting the Hidden Treasure".

Shah Nimatullah Wali describes the necessity to turn away from everything subject to change in order to come close to God and turn away from idolatry:

"So turn away from everything and find thus what you seek. Once you've abandoned everything He'll then reveal a cheek."

Simultaneously, the author warns the audience not to confuse poverty with "lacking possession" (turning away from everything subject to change):

"The meaning of 'non-existence of ownership' is that the poor man has nothing that can be attributed to himself as a possession, to the extent that he becomes annihiliated from himself, such that, 'The poor man does not need anything and nothing needs him.' This is the station of pure unity and absolute oneness, notwithstanding the fact that unity becomes confirmed each time an excess is shed, for 'Unity is the shedding of excesses.' This is the reason why it has been said, 'When poverty is perfected there is only God left.'"

==== Unity of existence ====
The first detailed formulation of "Unity of Existence" (wahdat al-wujud) is closely associated to Ibn Arabi. Widely different interpretations of the meaning of the "Unity of Existence" have been proposed throughout the centuries by critics, defenders, and Western scholars. Ibn Arabi himself did not use the term "Unity of Existence" and similar statements had been made by those before him. For example, according to al-Ghazali "There is nothing in wujud [existence] except God...Wujud [Existence] only belongs to the Real One". Ghazali explains that the fruit of spiritual ascent of the Sufi is to "witness that there is no existence in the world save God and that 'All things are perishing except his face' (Quran 28:88)"

Many authors consider being or existence to be the proper designation for the reality of God. While all Muslims believe the reality of God to be one, critics hold that the term "existence" (wujud) is also used for the existence of things in this world and that the doctrine blurs the distinction between the existence of the creator and that of the creation. Defenders argued that Ibn Arabi and his followers are offering a "subtle metaphysics following the line of the Asharite formula: "The attributes are neither God nor other than God." God's "signs" (ayat) and "traces" (athar)—the creatures—are neither the same as God nor different from him, because God must be understood as both absent and present, both transcendent and immanent. Understood correctly, wahdat al-wujud elucidates the delicate balance that needs to be maintained between these two perspectives." Shah Wali Allah of Delhi argued that the Ibn Arabi's "unity of being" was experiential and based on a subjective experience of illumination or ecstasy, rather than an ontological reality.

Uttering I or considering oneself as in power separate from God are forms of idolatry for many Sufis. In the metaphysical cosmology of Sufism, God's sovereignty is a necessity, not an accident. Therefore, it is impossible to worship something else but God. By venerating the self, one worships God in the name of Jalal (majesty). This name is supposed to be worshipped and then transmitted by Iblis (Satan). Since it is impossible for two majesties to co-exist, one cannot participate in divine intimacy or mercy and will also be subject to God's wrath.

== Influences on Muslim culture ==
The Islamic doctrine of Tawhid puts forth a God whose rule, will or law are comprehensive and extend to all creatures and to all aspects of the human life. Early Muslims thus understood religion to cover the domains of the state, law and society. It is believed that the entirety of the Islamic teaching rests on the principle of Tawhid. Muslims use the single raised index finger gesture (al-sabbaba or al-sabbaha) as a symbol of tawhid. In the following, we provide a few examples of the influences of Tawhid on the Muslim culture:

=== Interpersonal relationship ===
According to the Quran, one consequence of properly conceived relationship between God and man as the served and servant is the proper relationship among humans. To achieve the former, the Quran consistently "reminds" mankind of two points: God is one; everything except God (including the entirety of nature) is contingent upon God. With all His might and glory, God is essentially the all-merciful God.

=== Good and evil ===
According to the Quran, God is the progenitor of all things, both good and evil. As is written in the Quran, all of humanity is created at the will of Allah, both the good and the evil, and their natures have been predisposed as such since the beginning of creation.

According to the Quran, Satan deviated from the unification of God in the story of creation of man by permitting his own hierarchical value system to supersede God's will: God asked the angels to bow to Adam, who he had created from clay. Satan refused and said, "I am better than him; you created me from fire and created him from clay". The medieval Muslim scholar Al-Ghazali, pointing out that the only legitimate "preference principle" in the sight of God is piety, wrote, "Every time a rich man believes that he is better than a poor one, or a white man believes that he is better than a black one, then he is being arrogant. He is adopting the same hierarchical principles adopted by Iblis [Satan] in his jahl [ignorance], and thus falling into shirk [opposite of Tawhid]".

=== Secularism ===
In many jurisdictions of the world, the laws and the people's general attitude hold that the sphere of public life should be secular and that belief in and the practice of religion should remain in the sphere of private life. One motive for adopting that stance has been to reduce the effects of conflicts between followers of different religions or between adherents of secularism and those of a religion. In public life, that view insists that the authority of the state prevails over any religious authorities.

For some Islamic thinkers, these propositions infringe the doctrine of tawhid and are therefore anathema. If the cosmos is a unified and harmonious whole, centred on the omnipotent and omnipresent God, they hold that recognising any other authority as superior is wrong. According to one writer, "Traditionally, a Muslim is not a nationalist, or citizen of a nation-state; he has no political identity, only a religious membership in the Ummah. For a traditional Muslim, Islam is the sole and sufficient identification tag and nationalism and nation-states are obstacles". Hence the idea of creating a wholly Islamic state, or a revived caliphate.

In practice, nearly all Muslims live their daily lives under some national jurisdiction and accept at least part of the constraints this involves.

=== Islamic art ===
The desire to preserve the unity and the transcendence of God has led to the prohibition of Muslims from creating representation or visual depictions of God, or of any Prophet including Muhammad. Representation in art of the human form is a disputed matter in fiqh. The key concern is that the use of statues or images may lead to idolatry. As a result, the dominant forms of expression in Islamic art became calligraphy and arabesque.

== See also ==
=== General links ===
- Glossary of Islam
- Outline of Islam
- Index of Islam-related articles
- Divine simplicity
- Index finger in Islam
- Islamic view of the Trinity
- Parable of those who associate partners with God

=== Terms ===
- Modalistic Monarchianism
- Shahada
- Shirk
- Taghut
- Taqarub
- Brahmo Samaj
- Salvation
- Unitarianism
