= Jeremiah on the Ruins of Jerusalem =

Painting by Horace Vernet

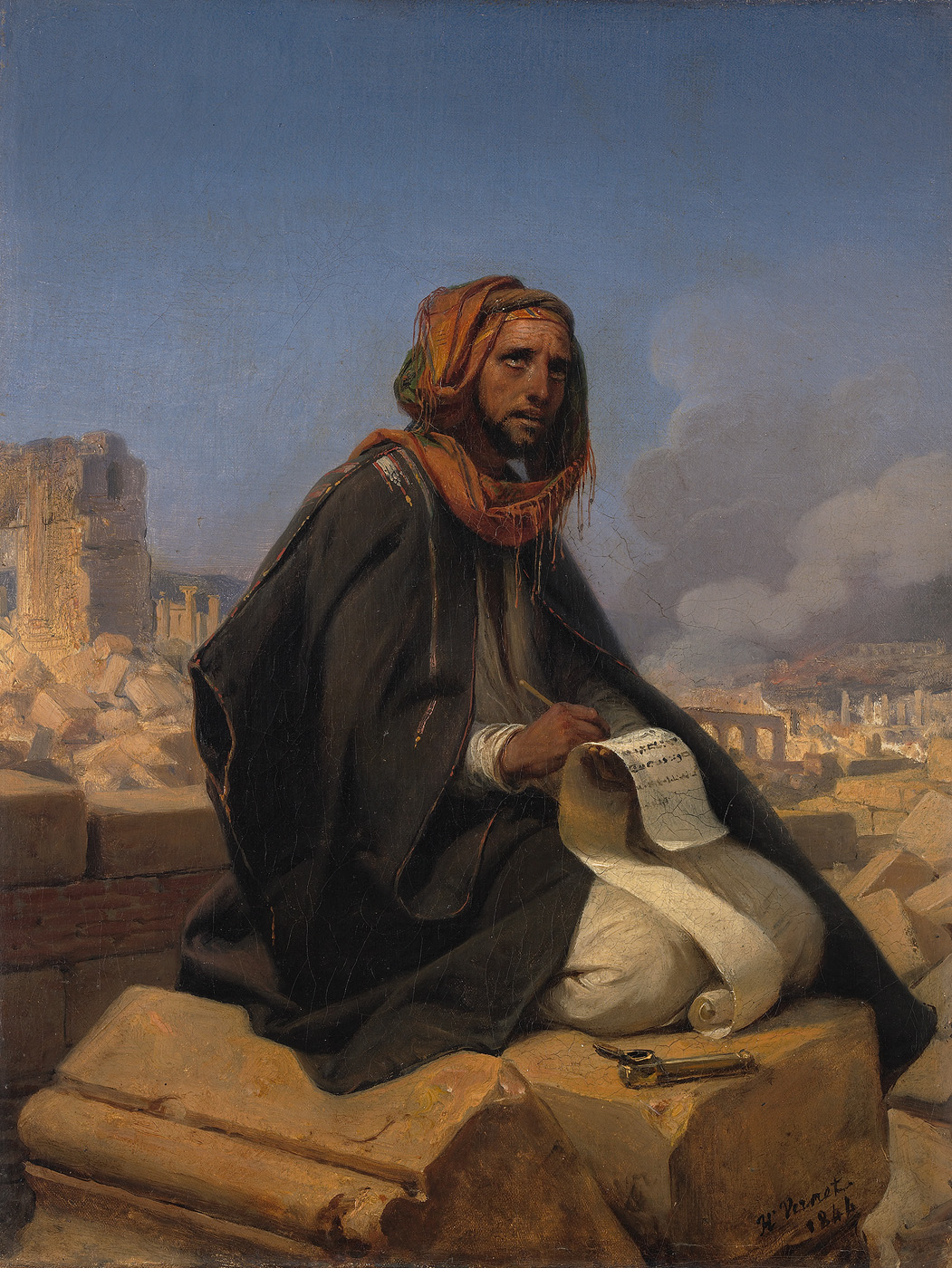
- Artist: Horace Vernet
- Year: 1844
- Type: Oil on canvas, religious art
- Dimensions: 35 cm × 27 cm (14 in × 11 in)
- Location: Amsterdam Museum; Amsterdam

Jeremiah on the Ruins of Jerusalem (Dutch: Jeremia op de puinhopen van Jeruzalem) is an 1844 oil painting by the French artist Horace Vernet. A religious history painting it depicts the biblical prophet Jeremiah set against the backdrop of the largely destroyed Jerusalem. Jeremiah had warned of the impending destruction of the city, but his voice was not heeded leading to the disastrous Siege of Jerusalem, which marked the beginning of the Babylonian exile. He is shown recording the events on a scroll, the future Book of Lamentations. The painting is also known as The Lamentations of Jeremiah.

During the French conquest of Algeria Vernet made several visits to North Africa and began producing works in the fashionable Oriental style. These included paintings of biblical scenes such as Judah and Tamar. The original painting was donated by Vernet to raise funds for a Mount Carmel convent and its whereabouts is today unknown. The engraver Jean-Alexandre Allais produced a print based on the work, which was exhibited at the Salon of 1845 at the Louvre. A smaller replica version of painting was bought by a Dutch art collector in 1861 for 5850 francs in Paris. Today it forms part of the collection of the Amsterdam Museum in the Netherlands.

The prophet had also appeared in a painting by Rembrandt Jeremiah Lamenting the Destruction of Jerusalem in 1630.

== Bibliography ==
- Cooper, Barbara T. & Donaldson-Evans Mary (ed.) Moving Forward, Holding Fast: The Dynamics of Nineteenth-Century French Culture. Brill, 2023.
- Galjaard, J.M. Kunst kopen, kunst verkopen: Relaties tussen kunstenaars en kunstminnaars. Staatsuitgeverij, 1985.
- Harkett, Daniel & Hornstein, Katie (ed.) Horace Vernet and the Thresholds of Nineteenth-Century Visual Culture. Dartmouth College Press, 2017.
- Ruutz-Rees, Janet Emily Horace Vernet and Paul Delaroche S. Low, Marston, Searle, & Rivington, 1880.
- Sweeney, Marvin A. & Chapman, Stephen B. (ed.) The Cambridge Companion to the Hebrew Bible/Old Testament. Cambridge University Press, 2016.
