= Jeremiah Lamenting the Destruction of Jerusalem =

1630 painting by Rembrandt

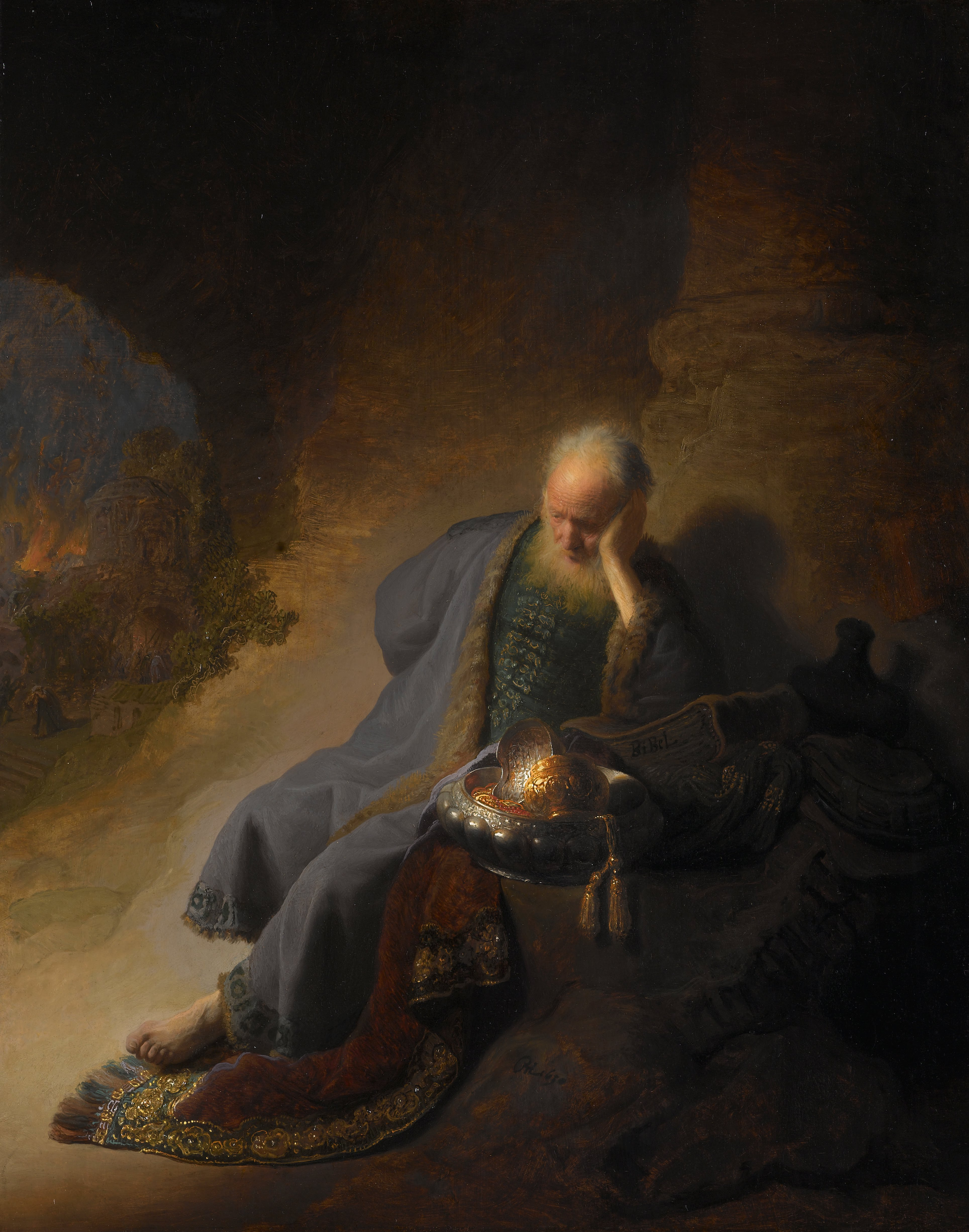
- Artist: Rembrandt
- Year: 1630
- Medium: Oil on panel
- Dimensions: 58 cm × 46 cm (23 in × 18 in)
- Location: Rijksmuseum, Amsterdam, Netherlands

Jeremiah Lamenting the Destruction of Jerusalem is a 1630 painting by Rembrandt. It is one of the most renowned works of his Leiden period.

== Reception ==
Many art critics have praised Jeremiah Lamenting the Destruction of Jerusalem as one of Rembrandt's few early masterpieces.

== See also ==
- List of paintings by Rembrandt
- Jeremiah on the Ruins of Jerusalem, an 1844 painting by Horace Vernet
