= Those who associate partners with God =

Parable in the Quran

The parable of those who associate partners with God is a parable in the Quran which appears in chapter Al-Hajj. The foolishness of those who invoke or worship anything besides God is presented in this parable.

This parable demonstrates the unity of God. As God is one and has no partners, there can be no partners associated with him nor can any worship, including prayers, be directed toward others to seek help and protection.

== Narrative ==
The parable is as follows:

O people, an example is presented, so listen to it. Indeed, those you invoke besides Allah will never create [as much as] a fly, even if they gathered together for that purpose. And if the fly should steal away from them a [tiny] thing, they could not recover it from him. Weak are the pursuer and pursued.They have not appraised Allah with true appraisal. Indeed, Allah is Powerful and Exalted in Might.

— Quran 22:73-74

This parable illustrates the futility of false worship and reality of associating partners with God.

Another parable with same message:

For Him (alone) is prayer in Truth: any others that they call upon besides Him hear them no more than if they were to stretch forth their hands for water to reach their mouths but it reaches them not: for the prayer of those without Faith is nothing but (futile) wandering (in the mind)

— Quran chapter Ar Ra'd verse 14

== Interpretation ==
This parable appears in the Al-Hajj immediately after verses 71 - 72 that help to explain the meaning of the parable:

And they worship besides Allah that for which He has not sent down authority and that of which they have no knowledge. And there will not be for the wrongdoers any helper.And when Our verses are recited to them as clear evidences, you recognize in the faces of those who disbelieve disapproval. They are almost on the verge of assaulting those who recite to them Our verses. Say, "Then shall I inform you of [what is] worse than that? [It is] the Fire which Allah has promised those who disbelieve, and wretched is the destination.

— Quran chapter Al-Hajj 22:71-72

In one of the most celebrated Quranic tafsir or interpretation called Maariful Quran by scholar Taqi Usmani says that by citing this parable the Quran illustrates the foolishness of those who worship false deities besides God.

The unbelievers are told that the false deities from which they seek the gratification of their desires are so utterly helpless that all of them together cannot create a humble thing like a fly. Indeed they cannot even protect the offerings of eatables, which their worshipers bring them daily, against the inroads of flies. Then how can they protect you from any calamity? The stupidity and foolishness of the idol-worshippers has been described at the end of the verse by the words (Feeble are the invoker and the invoked - 22:73) meaning thereby that if the object of worship is so utterly weak and powerless, those worshiping it must be more so.(They did not recognize God in His true esteem - 22:74). It means that these people are so foolish and ungrateful that they did not recognize the power of God, the exalted and place their helpless false objects of worship at the same level with Him.
