= Taqarub =

Islamic concept of peaceful coexistence between Muslims and non-Muslims

Taqarub is an Islamic doctrine that advocates cordial relations and peaceful coexistence between Muslims and non-Muslims. It also encourages the involvement of groups often excluded by traditionalist Wahhabis, such as Shi'ites or feminists.
