= Parables in the Quran =

Parables in the Quran are used in a variety of forms and covering many themes. According to Afnan Fatani a contemporary scholar it is not the instructive stories but rather the cognitive role they play to illustrate abstract religion and to make the unfamiliar appear familiar that makes them important. They are meant to teach moral lessons, and usually the figures involved are of little importance as more attention is paid to the lesson than the figure. Below are some examples of parables in the Qur'an.

== List ==
- The Hamlet in Ruins in Quran 2:259
- The Two Gardens in chapter 18:32–44
- The Worldly Life. In Quran 18:45-46, worldly life is compared to the fall of rain and the cycle of vegetation:

"And strike for them a parable of the worldly life: it is like the water which we send down from the sky, and then the plants of the earth mingle with it. But then they become dry and broken and are scattered by the winds. And God is capable of all things."

- Those who associate partners with God in Quran 22:73-74
- The House of the Spider in Quran 29:41

== See also ==
- Parables of Jesus
