= The Hamlet in Ruins =

Quranic story

The Hamlet in Ruins is a parable in the second chapter, Al-Baqara, Quran 2:259 of the Quran. It mentions a man who passed by a hamlet in ruins, and asked himself how God will be able to resurrect the dead on the Day of Judgement.

The incident is identified by Abdullah Yusuf Ali with a number of Biblical events. One identification is Ezekiel's vision of dry bones. Another is Nehemiah's visit to Jerusalem in ruins after the Captivity and to Ezra, the scribe, priest and reformer, about whom many similar tales have come down in Jewish tradition over time. However, all scholars of Islam agree that the identity of the man is least important as the tale is given in the Qur'an as a parable.

== Narrative ==
The Qur'an narrates in Quran 2:259 that a man passed by a hamlet in ruins, where the people who lived there had died generations earlier, and then asked himself how God will be able to resurrect the dead on the Day of Judgment. The Qur'an goes on to say that God subsequently caused the man to die for a hundred years, and then raised him to life again. God then asked the man how long he felt he had remained sleeping, to which the man replied perhaps one day or part of day, at which point he was told the truth. Then God tells the man to look at his food and drink, which was intact, and both were as fresh as it when he had left them, showing that God has power over all things and controls time for all things. The man's donkey, however, was not only dead but was reduced to pure skeletal form. And then, by God's power, the bones joined right in front of his eyes, and the body clothed itself in muscles, flesh and blood, resulting in the donkey coming back to life.

The Qur'anic verse reads:

Or (take) the similitude of one who passed by a hamlet, all in ruins to its roofs. He said: "Oh! How shall God bring it (ever) to life, after (this) its death?" But God caused him to die for a hundred years, then raised him up (again). He said: "How long didst thou tarry (thus)?" He said: (Perhaps) a day or part of a day." He said: "Nay, thou hast tarried thus a hundred years; but look at thy food and thy drink; they show no signs of age; and look at thy donkey: And that We may make of thee a sign unto the people, look further at the bones, how We bring them together and clothe them with flesh." When this was shown clearly to him, he said: "I know that God hath power over all things."

— Qur'an, Sura 2 (Al-Baqara), ayah 259, Quran 2:259

== Moral ==
This parable is used to teach various lessons. Firstly, it represents that time is nothing to God, who has power over time. Secondly, it teaches that the keys of life, death and resurrection are in God's control only, and that man has no power over the three. Finally, like most Qur'anic parables, it illustrates that man's power is nothing, and his utmost faith should rest in God alone.

Addresses a man who is filled with doubts examining the state of his soul (like an abandoned town with homes without foundations) and asking God how his soul can ever be revived. Each moment passed with doubts not addressed is like years passing of your life (deteriorate into a carcass). When he sought God's guidance, his soul was filled with life.

== Literature ==
This story has been rewritten by the Argentine writer Jorge Luis Borges in his short story "El milagro secreto" (The Secret Miracle).

== See also ==
- Parables in the Quran
- Those who associate partners with God
