= Zubdat al-Tawarikh =

Turkish illuminated manuscript

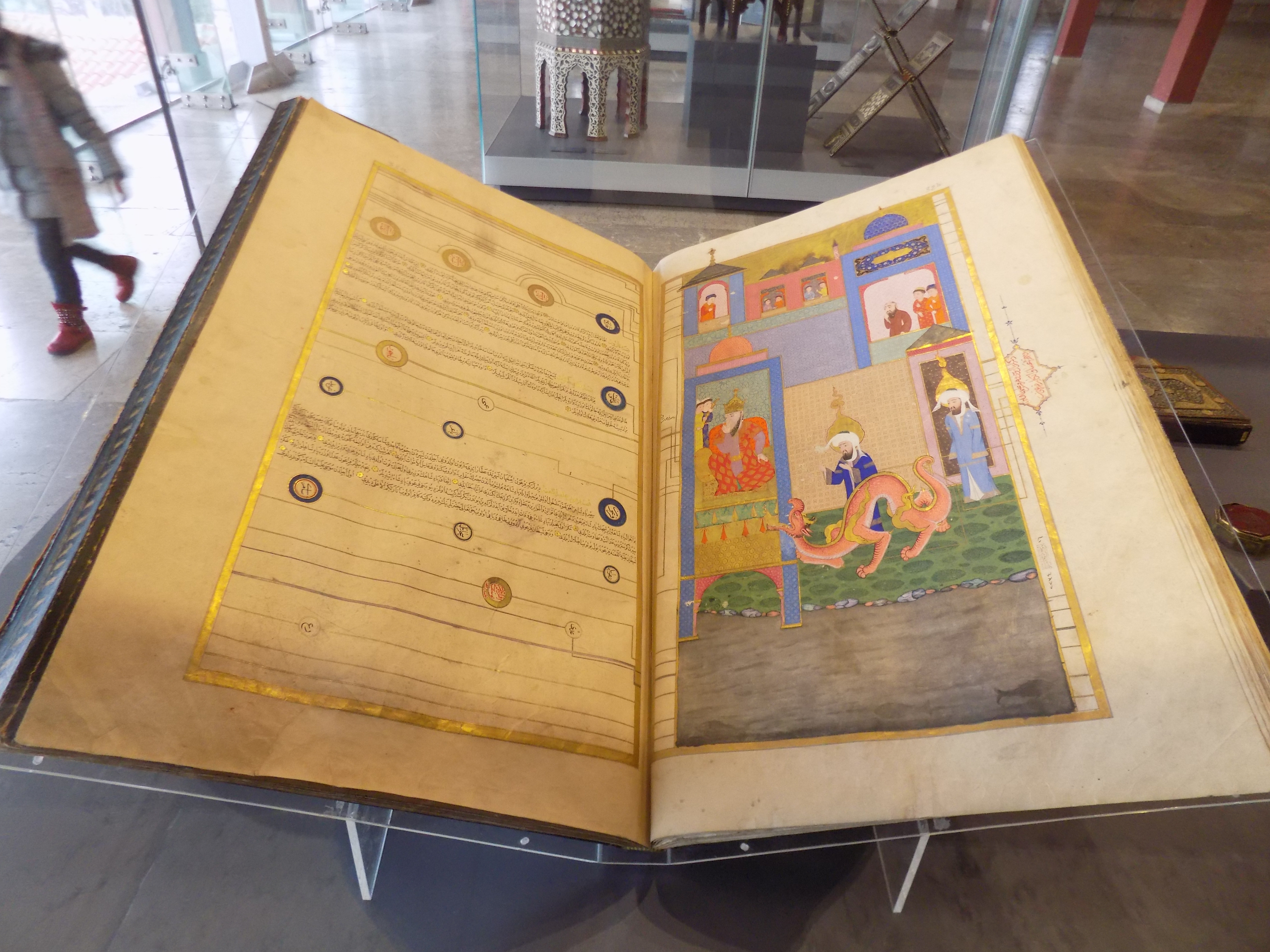
Manuscript of "Zubdat al-Tawarikh" from 1583 (TIEM 1973). on display in 2017

The Zubdat al-Tawarikh ('Essence of History') is an Ottoman genealogy written in Turkish nashki script by calligrapher Sayyid Loqman Aşuri and illuminated throughout with miniatures by painters al-Sayyid Lutfi, Molla Kasım (Mulla Qasim) and Ustad Osman and their workshop, in 1583, for Sultan Murad III.

== Sources ==
- Kutluay, Sevgi (2023). "Zubdat al-Tawarikh ('Cream of Histories')". Discover Islamic Art. Museum With No Frontiers.
- Minorsky, V. (1958). A Catalogue of the Turkish Manuscripts and Miniatures. The Chester Beatty Library. Hodges Figgis & Co. Ltd. pp. 21–5.
