= Panel with striding lion =

Panel of Neo-Babylonian glazed ceramics

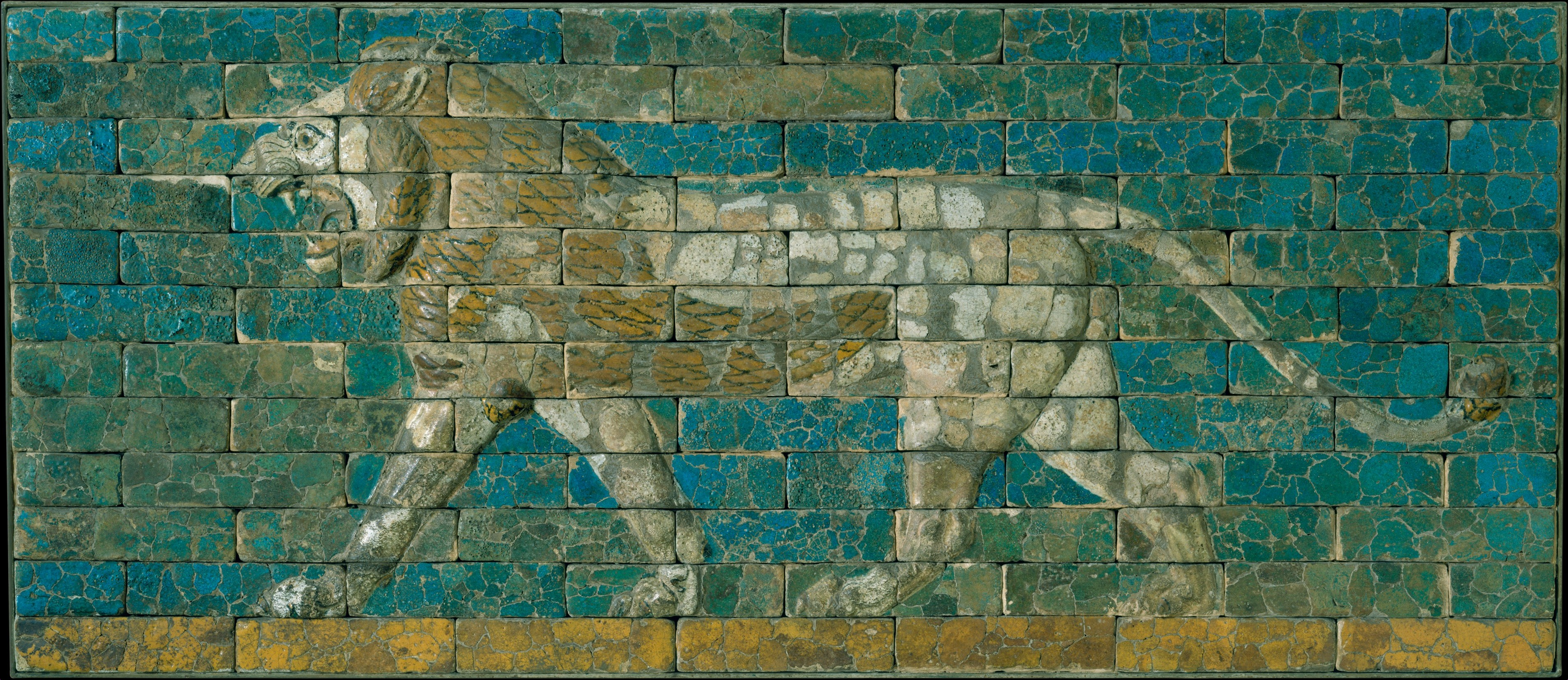
- Artist: Unknown
- Year: c. 6th century BC
- Medium: glaze and paint on molded brick
- Dimensions: 97.16 cm × 227.33 cm (38.25 in × 89.50 in)
- Location: Metropolitan Museum of Art

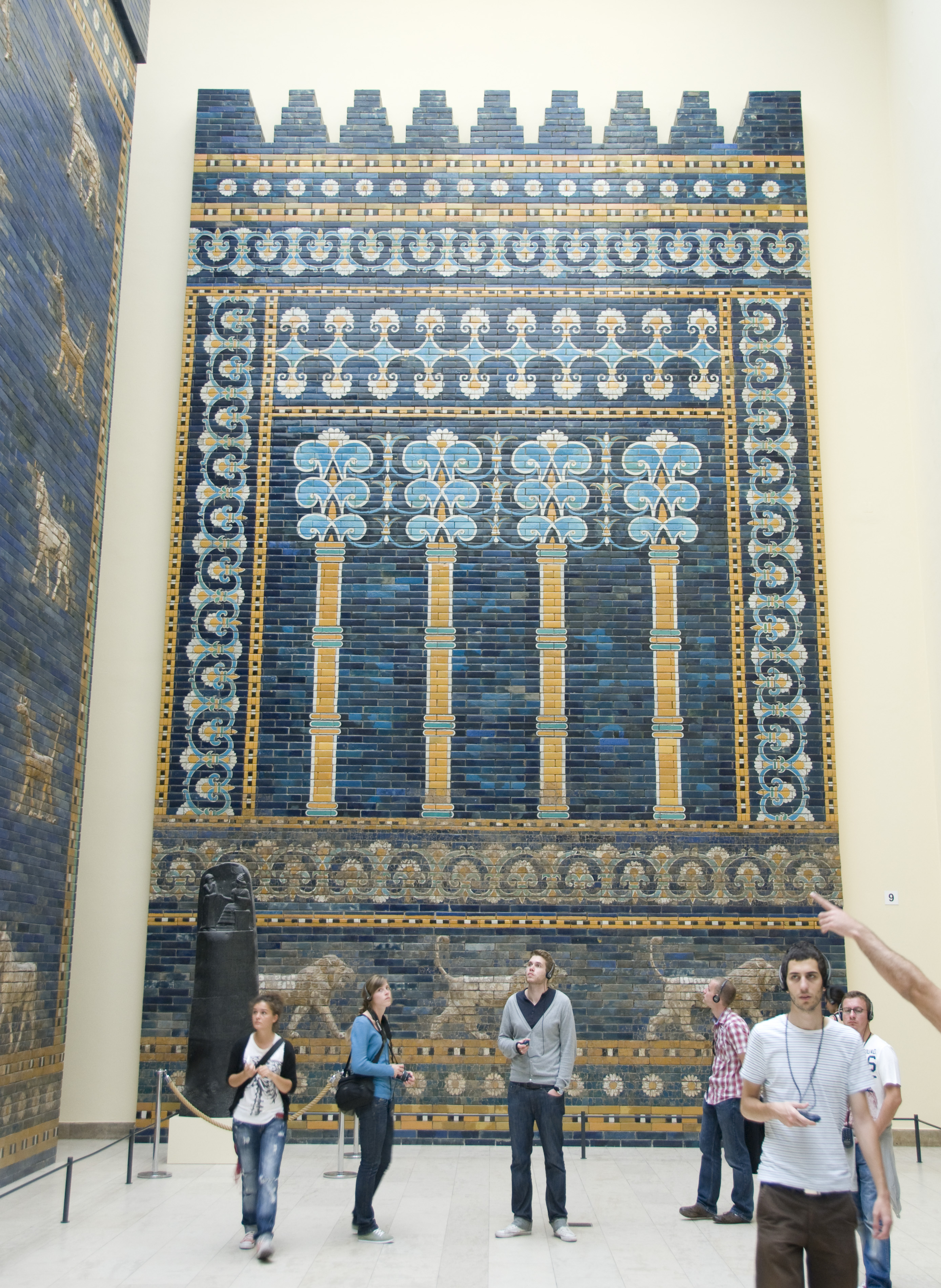
Sections of the Processional Way in the Pergamon Museum, Berlin

The Panel with striding lion (MA 31.13.1) is a panel of Neo-Babylonian glazed ceramic bricks or tiles dated to 604–562 BC, now in the Metropolitan Museum of Art, New York. It was one of many that lined the Processional Way north of the Ishtar Gate. It was excavated by R. Koldewey in 1902, and at the Staatliche Museen zu Berlin from 1926, before coming into the possession of the Met in 1931.

A large group of such figures is part of the Processional Way leading to the Ishtar Gate, a centrepiece display of the Pergamon Museum in Berlin.

Lions were symbolic of royalty because of their strength, and fighting a lion gave a king great prestige. The lion was also the symbol of Ishtar, the goddess of love and war. In her role of the goddess of war she is depicted on a chariot drawn by seven lions with bow in hand

== See also ==
- Striding Lion, a similar panel in Toronto

== Sources ==
- Dimand, Maurice. "Two Babylonian Reliefs of Enameled Brick." Bulletin of the Metropolitan Museum of Art, Nr. 26, 1931
- Glubok, Shirley. The Art of Lands in the Bible. New York: Atheneum, 1963
