= Striding Lion =

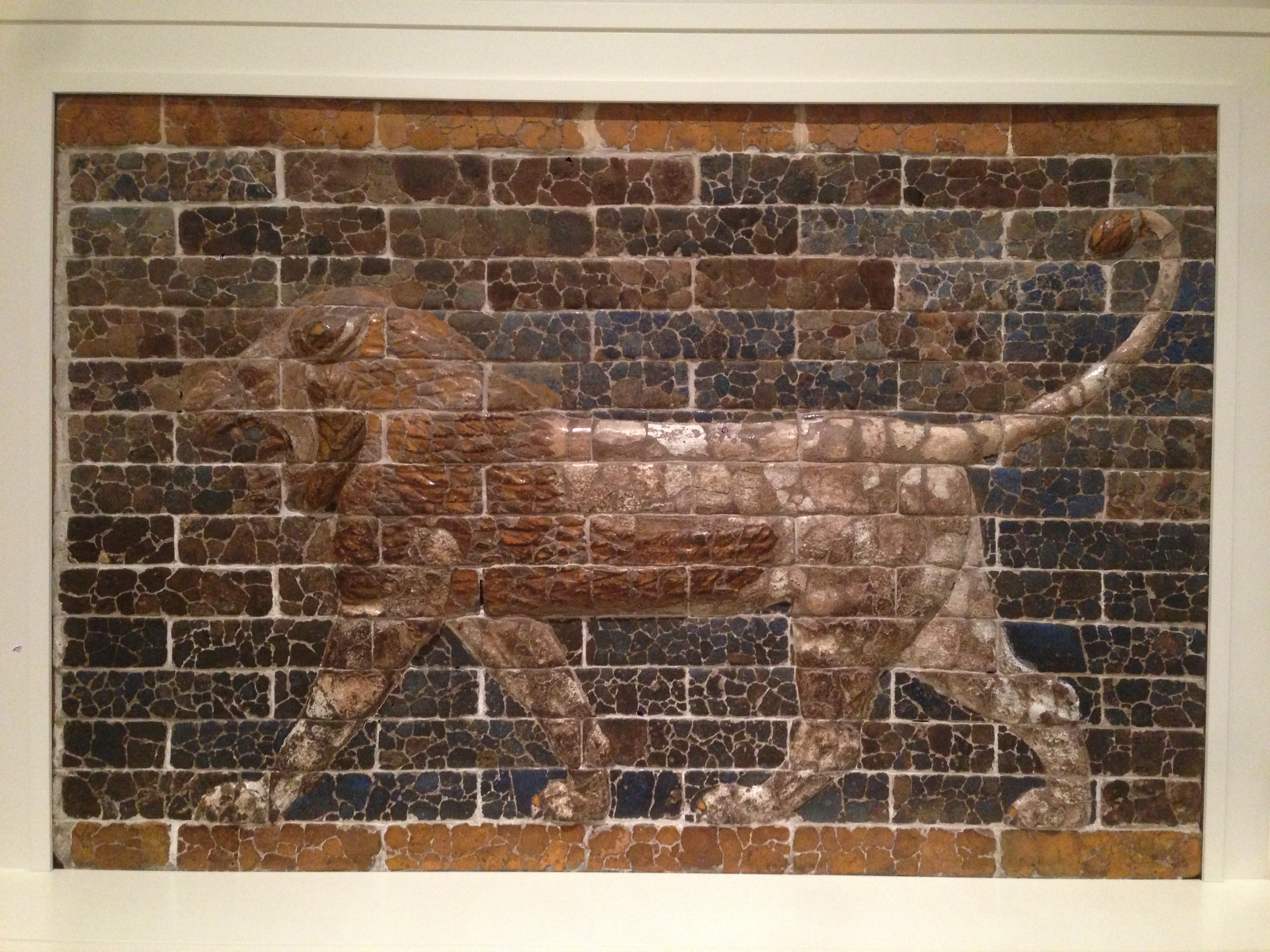
Glazed brick relief of a striding lion from the palace of Nebuchadnezzar II on display in the Royal Ontario Museum

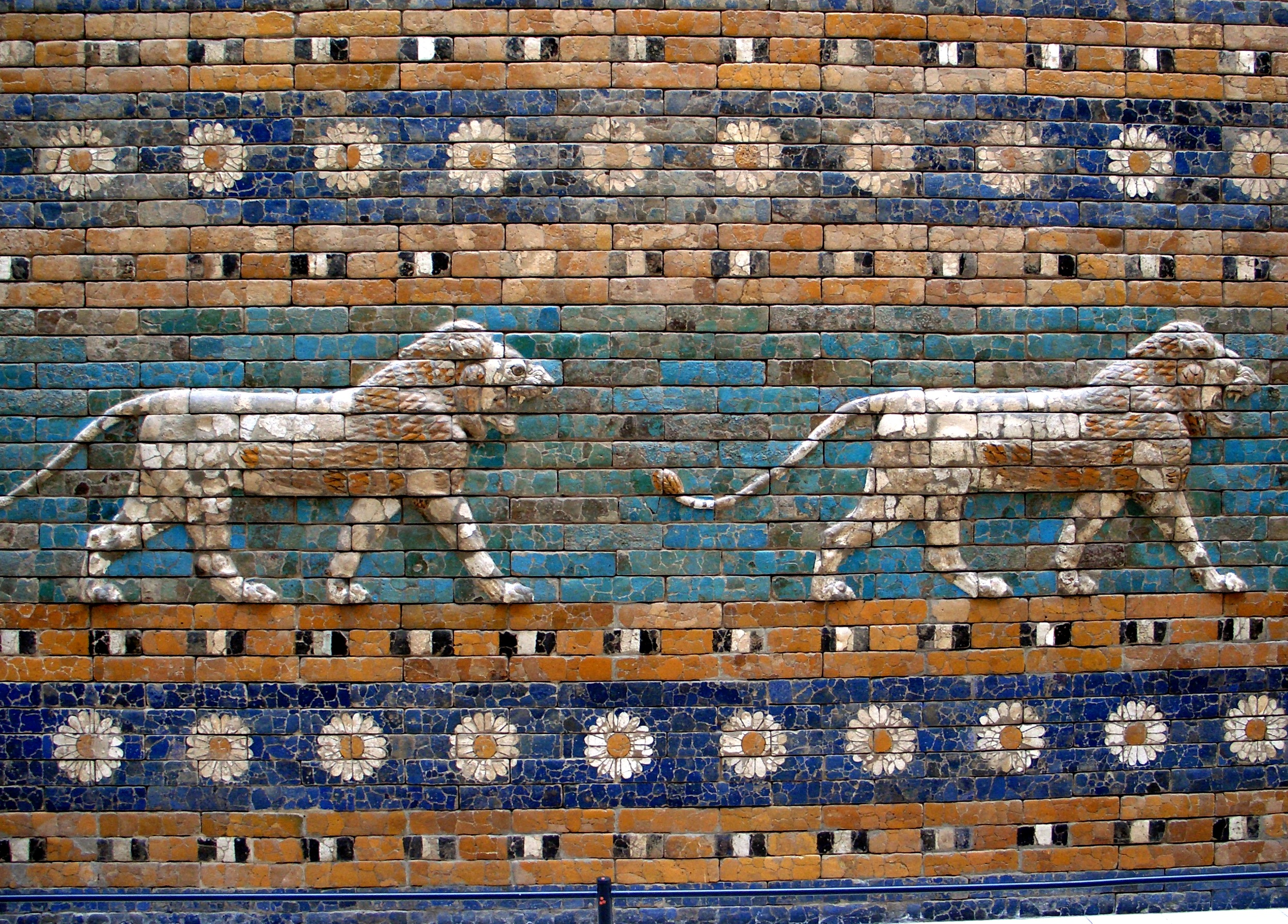
Glazed brick reliefs depicting lions from the Ishtar Gate, Babylon. Vorderasiatisches Museum

Striding Lion, a wall relief made from polychrome glazed, fired bricks, is one of the most iconic objects on display at the Royal Ontario Museum, Toronto. It came from Babylon, Iraq, and dates to the time of Nebuchadnezzar II (605–562 BCE), king of the Neo-Babylonian Empire. Striding Lion is one of many such reliefs that decorated the walls of the palace's ceremonial hall and very similar to the lions that line the processional way from the Ishtar Gate to the temple of Marduk.

A large group of such figures is part of the Processional Way leading to the Ishtar Gate, a centrepiece display of the Pergamon Museum in Berlin. Other panels were sold by Berlin, such as the Panel with striding lion in New York.

== Description ==
The relief measures 122 cm (height) by 183 cm (width) by 8 cm (depth).

Several of the bricks are stamped with the inscription: "Nebuchadnezzar, king of Babylon, the first born son of Nabopolassar, the king of Babylon".

== Origin ==
The ceremonial hall in the palace of Nebuchadnezzar II had a tiled wall decorated with glazed columns, lotus buds and palmettes with lions striding around the base, of which the example in the Royal Ontario Museum is one.

From 1899 to 1917, Robert Koldewey led a German expedition that excavated Babylon. The fragments of tile found in the ceremonial hall of the palace, also referred to as the throne room of the Southern Citadel, were taken back to Berlin and painstakingly reassembled, as were the tiles from the Ishtar Gate and Processional Way. In 1937 the Royal Ontario Museum purchased the reconstructed striding lion relief from the State Museums of Berlin.

== Production method ==
Robert Koldewey suggested that the lions, and other reliefs lining the Processional Way, were made using molds taken from a master clay panel, or from a temporary wall with a plaster facing that had been cut down into brick sized segments. Care had been taken to ensure the joints were not too visible and the relief work such as to facilitate removal from a mold. The bricks were then fired in a kiln, and then glazed with the appropriate colours. Marks were made on a tile's upper edge to enable it to be placed in proper sequence when assembled. The system of marks used for assembling the reliefs could be most clearly seen on the tiles from the ceremonial hall because of the way they had fallen after robbers had taken bricks from the wall.

== Significance of lion symbolism ==
Lions were symbolic of royalty because of their strength, and fighting a lion gave a king great prestige. The lion was also the symbol of Ishtar, the goddess of love and war. In her role of the goddess of war she is depicted, bow in hand, on a chariot drawn by seven lions.
