= Ishtar Gate =

Eighth gate to the capital city of Babylon

Coordinates: 32°32′36″N 44°25′20″E

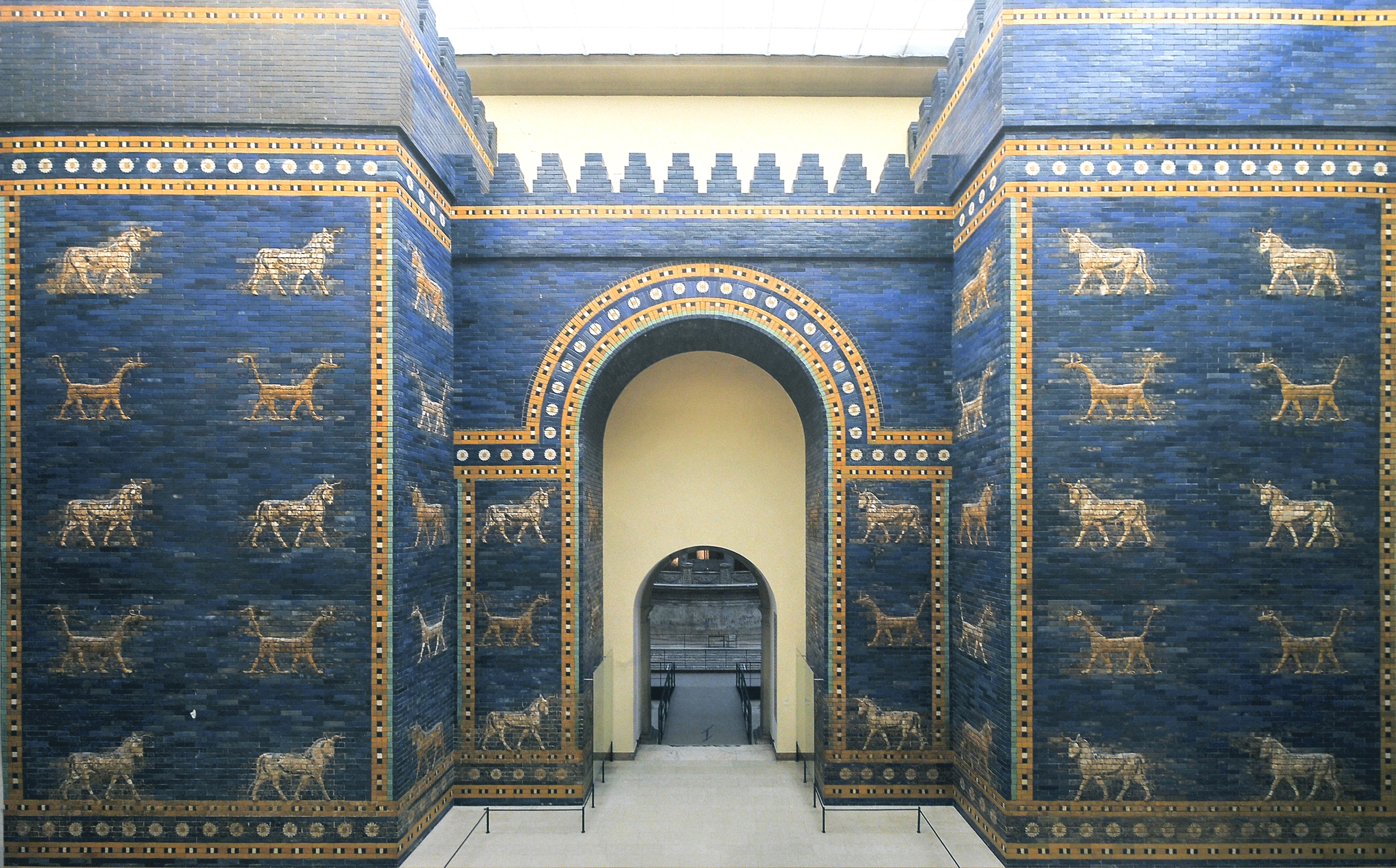
Ishtar Gate, Pergamon Museum, Berlin.

The Ishtar Gate was the eighth gate to the inner city wall of Babylon (in the area of present-day Hillah, Babylon Governorate, Iraq). It was constructed c. 569 BC by order of King Nebuchadnezzar II on the north side of the city. It was part of a grand walled processional way leading into the city.

The original structure was a double gate with a smaller frontal gate and a larger and more grandiose secondary posterior section. The walls were finished in glazed bricks mostly in blue, with animals and deities (also made up of coloured bricks) in low relief at intervals. The gate was 15 metres high, and the original foundations extended another 14 metres underground.

German archaeologist Robert Koldewey led the excavation of the site from 1904 to 1914. After the end of the First World War in 1918, the smaller frontal gate was reconstructed in the Pergamon Museum in Berlin.

Other panels from the façade of the gate are located in many other museums around the world.

The façade of the Iraqi embassy in Beijing, China, includes a replica of the Ishtar Gate. The façades of the Iraqi embassies in Amman, Jordan, and Islamabad, Pakistan, also evoke the Ishtar Gate.

== History ==
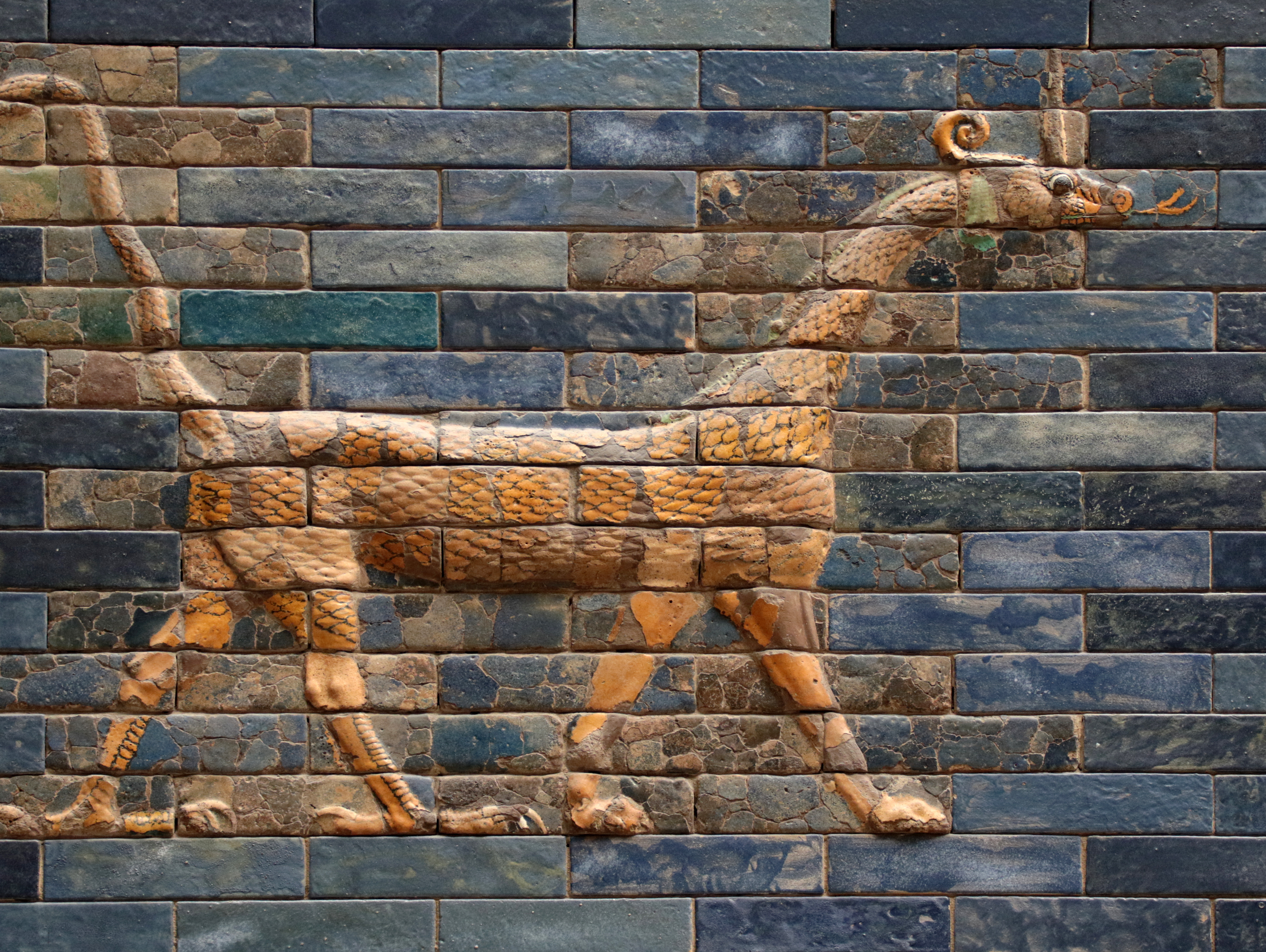
One of the mušḫuššu dragons from the gate

King Nebuchadnezzar II reigned 604–562 BC, the peak of the Neo-Babylonian Empire. He is known as the biblical conqueror who captured Jerusalem. He ordered the construction of the gate and dedicated it to the Babylonian goddess Ishtar. The gate was constructed using glazed brick with alternating rows of bas-relief mušḫuššu (dragons), aurochs (bulls), and lions, symbolizing the gods Marduk, Adad, and Ishtar respectively.

The roof and doors of the gate were made of cedar, according to the dedication plaque. The bricks in the gate were covered in a blue glaze meant to represent lapis lazuli, a deep-blue semi-precious stone that was revered in antiquity due to its vibrancy. The blue-glazed bricks would have given the façade a jewel-like shine. Through the gate ran the Processional Way, which was lined with walls showing about 120 lions, bulls, dragons, and flowers on yellow and black glazed bricks, symbolizing the goddess Ishtar. The gate itself depicted only gods and goddesses. These included Ishtar, Adad, and Marduk. During celebrations of the New Year, statues of the deities were paraded through the gate and down the Processional Way.

== Design ==
The front of the gate has a low-relief design with a repeated pattern of images of two of the major gods of the Babylonian pantheon. Marduk, the national deity and chief god, with his servant dragon Mušḫuššu, is depicted as a dragon with a snake-like head and tail, a scaled body of a lion, and powerful talons for back feet. Marduk was seen as the divine champion of good against evil, and the incantations of the Babylonians often sought his protection.

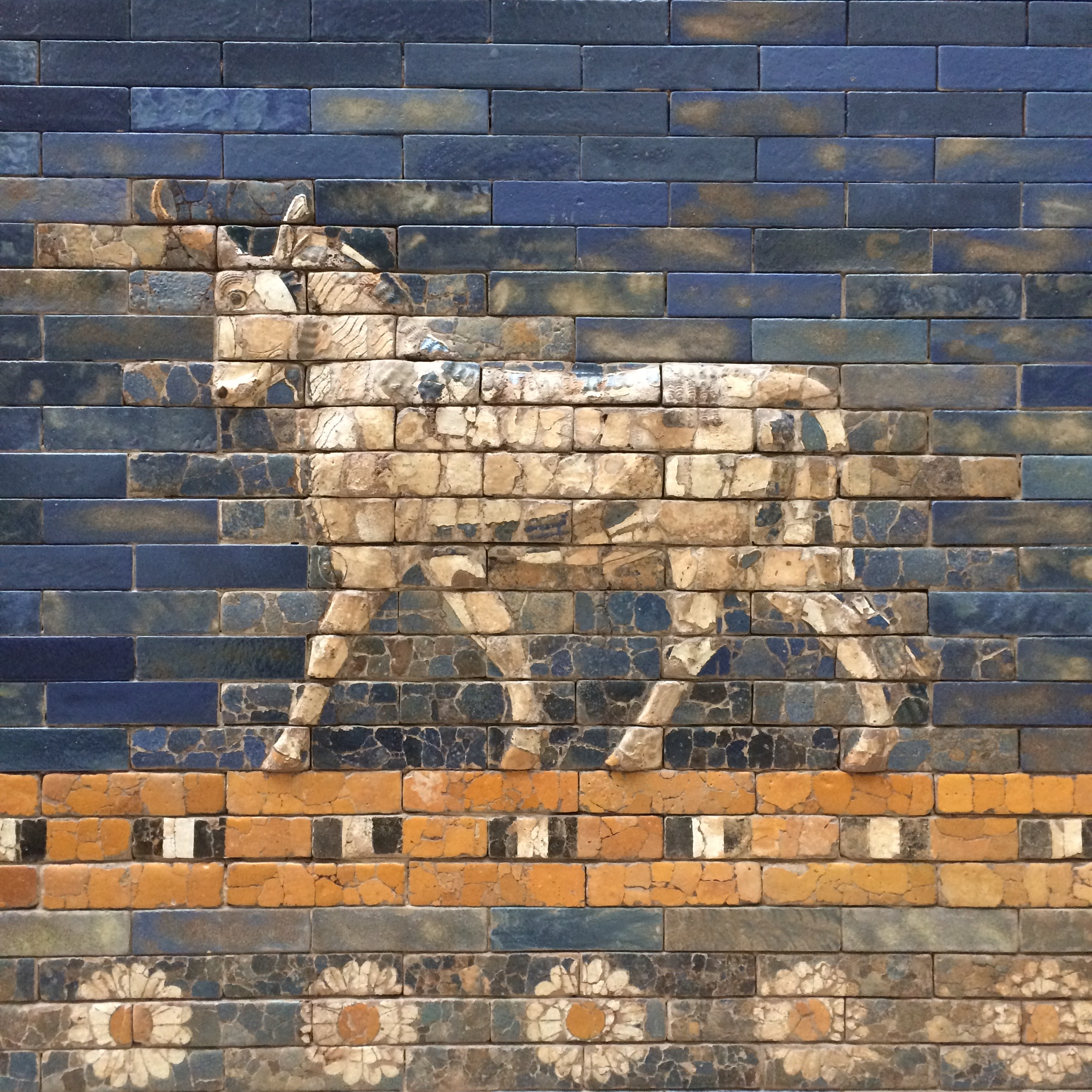
An aurochs above a flower ribbon, with missing tiles replaced

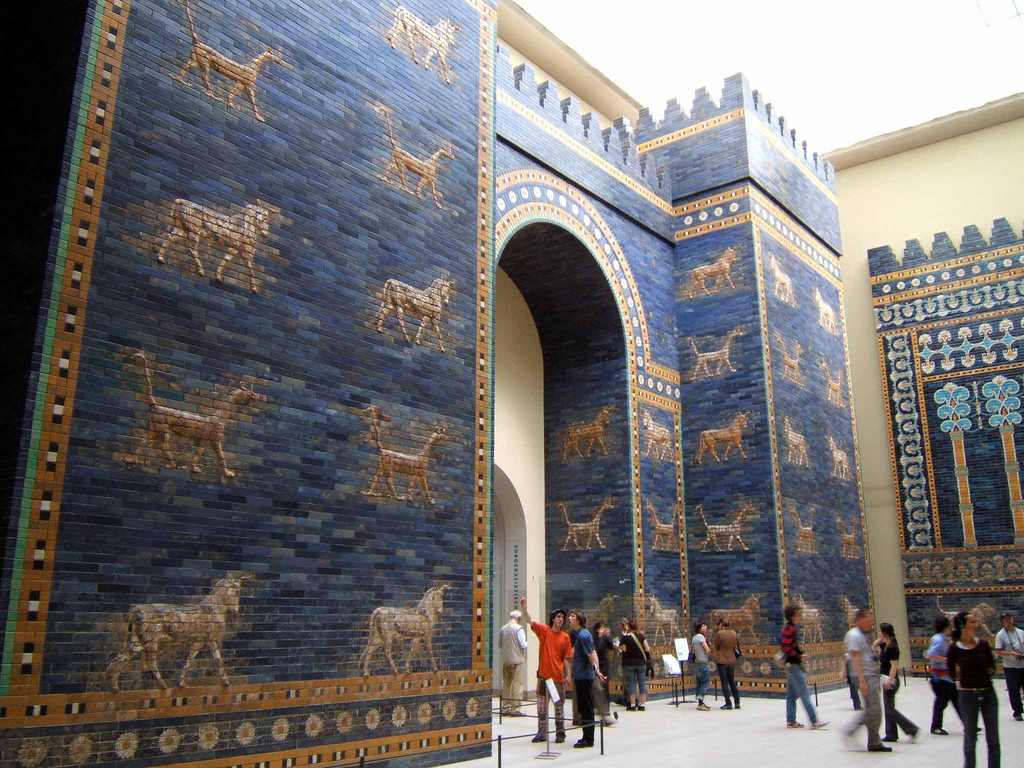
The Ishtar Gate in the Pergamon Museum in Berlin

The second god shown in the pattern of reliefs on the Ishtar Gate is Adad (also known as Ishkur), whose sacred animal was the aurochs, a now-extinct ancestor of cattle. Adad had power over destructive storms and beneficial rain. The design of the Ishtar Gate also includes linear borders and patterns of rosettes, often seen as symbols of fertility.

The bricks of the Ishtar gate were made from finely textured clay pressed into wooden forms. Each of the animal reliefs was also made from bricks formed by pressing clay into reusable molds. Seams between the bricks were carefully planned not to occur on the eyes of the animals or any other aesthetically unacceptable places. The bricks were sun-dried and then fired once before glazing. The clay was brownish red in this bisque-fired state.

The background glazes are mainly a vivid blue, which imitates the color of the highly prized lapis lazuli. Gold and brown glazes are used for animal images. The borders and rosettes are glazed in black, white, and gold. It is believed that the glaze recipe used plant ash, sandstone conglomerates, and pebbles for silicates. This combination was repeatedly melted, cooled, and then pulverized. This mixture of silica and fluxes is called a frit. Color-producing minerals, such as cobalt, were added in the final glaze formulations. This was then painted onto the bisque-fired bricks and fired to a higher temperature in a glaze firing.

The creation of the gate out of wood and clay glazed to look like lapis lazuli could possibly be a reference to the goddess Inanna, who became syncretized with the goddess Ishtar during the reign of Sargon of Akkad. In the myth of Inanna's descent to the underworld, Inanna is described as donning seven accoutrements of lapis lazuli symbolizing her divine power. Once captured by the queen of the underworld, Inanna is described as being lapis lazuli, silver, and wood, two of these materials being key components in the construction of the Ishtar Gate. The creation of the gate out of wood and "lapis lazuli" linking the gate to being part of the Goddess herself.

After the glaze firing, the bricks were assembled, leaving narrow horizontal seams from one to six millimeters. The seams were then sealed with a naturally occurring black viscous substance called bitumen, like modern asphalt. The Ishtar Gate is only one small part of the design of ancient Babylon that also included the palace, temples, an inner fortress, walls, gardens, other gates, and the Processional Way. The lavish city was decorated with over 15 million baked bricks, according to estimates.

The main gate led to the Southern Citadel, the gate itself seeming to be a part of Imgur-Bel and Nimitti-Bel, two of the most prominent defensive walls of Babylon. There were three primary entrances to the Ishtar Gate: the central entrance which contained the double gate structure (two sets of double doors, for a fourfold door structure), and doors flanking the main entrance to the left and right, both containing the signature double door structure.

== Ishtar Gate and Processional Way ==
Once per year, the Ishtar Gate and connecting Processional Way were used for a New Year's procession, which was part of a religious festival celebrating the beginning of the agricultural year. In Babylon, the rituals surrounding this holiday lasted twelve days. The New Year's celebrations started immediately after the barley harvest, at the time of the vernal equinox. This was the first day of the ancient month of Nisan, equivalent to today's date of March 20 or 21.

The Processional Way, which has been traced to a length of over 800 meters, extended north from the Ishtar Gate and was designed with brick relief images of lions, the symbol of the goddess Ishtar (also known as Inanna) the war goddess, the dragon of Marduk, the lord of the gods, and the bull of Adad, the storm god. Worshipped as the Mistress of Heaven, Ishtar represented the power of sexual attraction and was thought to be savage and determined. Symbolized by the star and her sacred animal, the lion, she was also the goddess of war and the protector of ruling dynasties and their armies. The idea of protection of the city is further incorporated into this gateway design by the use of crenelated buttresses along both sides to this entrance into the city.

Friezes with sixty ferocious lions representing Ishtar decorated each side of the Processional Way, designed with variations in the color of the fur and the manes. On the east side, they had a left foot forward, and on the west side, they had the right foot forward. Each lion was made of forty-six molded bricks in eleven rows. The lion is pictured upon a blue enameled tile background and an orange coloured border that runs along the very bottom portion of the wall. Having a white body and yellow mane, the lion of Ishtar was an embodiment of vivid naturalism that further enhanced the glory of Babylon's Procession Street.

The purpose of the New Year's holiday was to affirm the supremacy of Marduk and his representative on Earth, the king, and to offer thanks for the fertility of the land.

The Processional Way was paved with large stone pieces set in a bed of bitumen and was up to 66 feet (20 meters) wide at some points. This street ran from the Euphrates through the temple district and palaces and onto the Ishtar Gate.

== Inscription of Nebuchadnezzar II ==
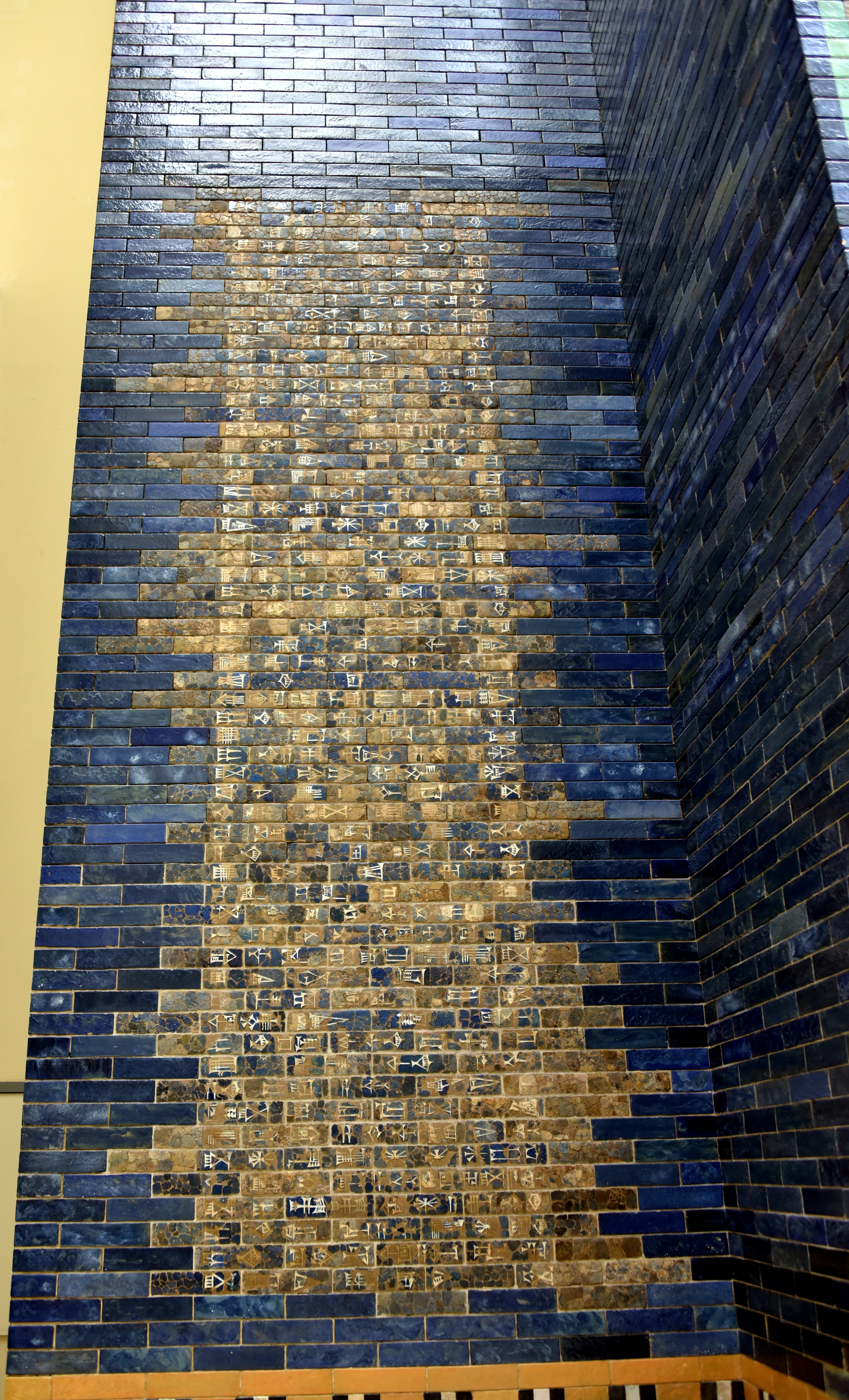
The cuneiform inscription of the Ishtar Gate in the Pergamon Museum in Berlin

The inscription of the Ishtar Gate is written in Akkadian cuneiform in white and blue glazed bricks and was a dedication by Nebuchadnezzar to explain the gate's purpose. On the wall of the Ishtar Gate, the inscription is 15 meters tall by 10 meters wide and includes 60 lines of writing. The inscription was created around the same time as the gate's construction, around 605–562 BC.

Inscription:

Nebuchadnezzar, King of Babylon, the pious prince appointed by the will of Marduk, the highest priestly prince, beloved of Nabu, of prudent deliberation, who has learnt to embrace wisdom, who fathomed Their (Marduk and Nabu) godly being and pays reverence to their Majesty, the untiring Governor, who always has at heart the care of the cult of Esagila and Ezida and is constantly concerned with the well being of Babylon and Borsippa, the wise, the humble, the caretaker of Esagila and Ezida, the first born son of Nabopolassar, the King of Babylon, am I.

Both gate entrances of the (city walls) Imgur-Ellil and Nemetti-Ellil following the filling of the street from Babylon had become increasingly lower. (Therefore,) I pulled down these gates and laid their foundations at the water table with asphalt and bricks and had them made of bricks with blue stone on which wonderful bulls and dragons were depicted. I covered their roofs by laying majestic cedars lengthwise over them. I fixed doors of cedar wood adorned with bronze at all the gate openings. I placed wild bulls and ferocious dragons in the gateways and thus adorned them with luxurious splendor so that Mankind might gaze on them in wonder.

I let the temple of Esiskursiskur, the highest festival house of Marduk, the lord of the gods, a place of joy and jubilation for the major and minor deities, be built firm like a mountain in the precinct of Babylon of asphalt and fired bricks.

== Excavation and display ==
A reconstruction of the Ishtar Gate and Processional Way was built at the Pergamon Museum in Berlin out of material excavated by Robert Koldewey. It includes the inscription plaque. It stands 14 m (46 ft) high and 30 m (100 ft) wide. The excavation ran from 1902 to 1914, and, during that time, 14 m (46 ft) of the foundation of the gate was uncovered.

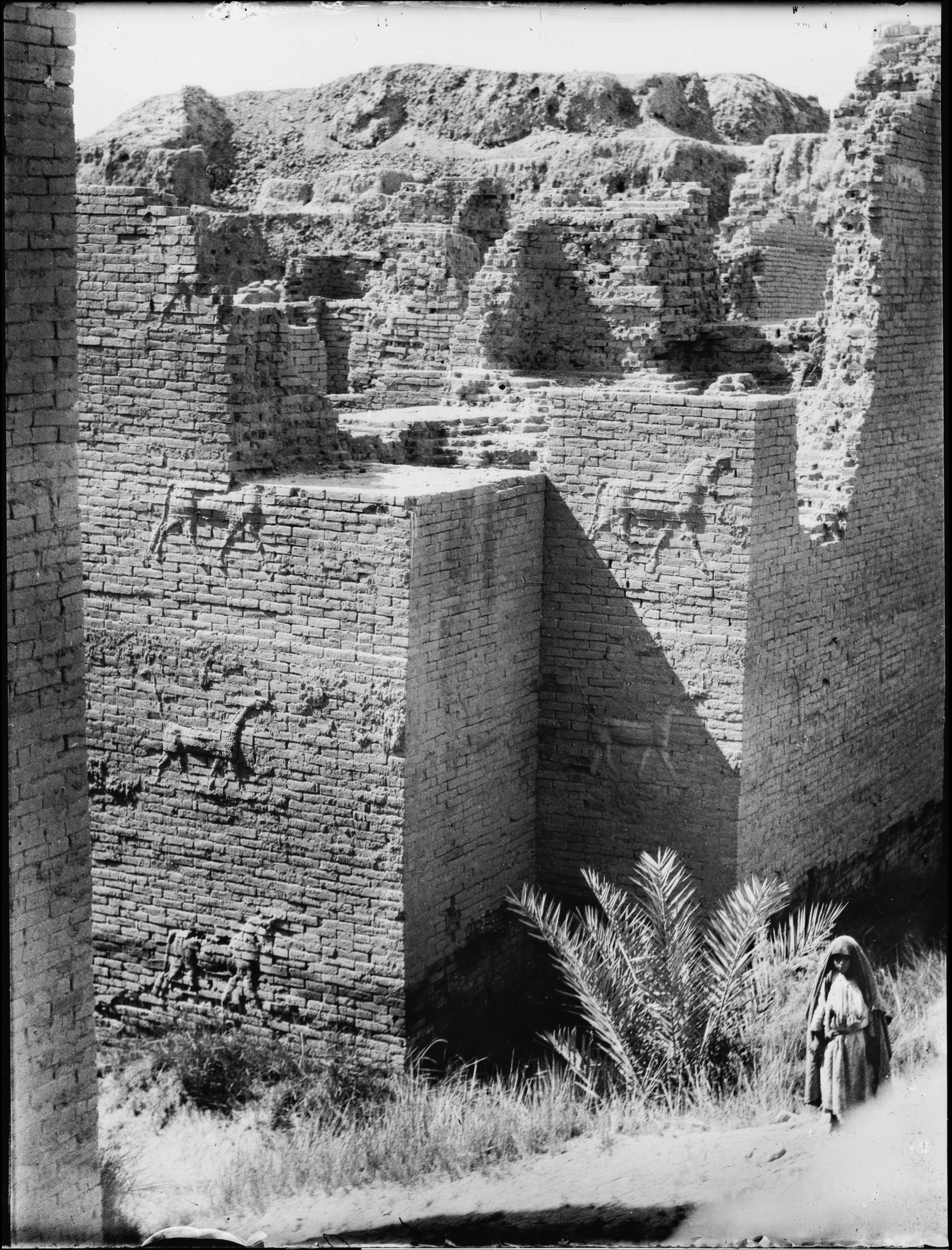
Walls of the Sacred Way outside of the Ishtar Gate. Reliefs of lions bulls, and dragons (emblems of Marduk)

Claudius Rich, British resident of Baghdad and a self-taught historian, did personal research on Babylon because it intrigued him. Acting as a scholar and collecting field data, he was determined to discover the wonders to the ancient world. Rich's topographical records of the ruins in Babylon were the first ever published, in 1815. It was reprinted in England no fewer than three times. Rich and most other 19th-century visitors thought a mound in Babylon was a royal palace, and that was eventually confirmed by Robert Koldewey's excavations, who found two palaces of King Nebuchadnezzar and the Ishtar Gate. Robert Koldewey, a successful German excavator, had done previous work for the Royal Museum of Berlin, with his excavations at Surghul (Ancient Nina) and Al-hiba (ancient Lagash) in 1887. Koldewey's part in Babylon's excavation began in 1899.

The method that the British were comfortable with was excavating tunnels and deep trenches, which was damaging the mud brick architecture of the foundation. Instead, it was suggested that the excavation team focus on tablets and other artifacts rather than pick at the crumbling buildings. Despite the destructive nature of the archaeology used, the recording of data was immensely more thorough than in previous Mesopotamian excavations. Walter Andrae, one of Koldewey's many assistants, was an architect and a draftsman, the first at Babylon. His contribution was documentation and reconstruction of Babylon, and then later, the smuggling of the remains out of Iraq and into Germany. A small museum was built at the site, and Andrae was the museum's first director.

As the German Oriental Society had provided such large funding for the project, the German archeologists involved felt that they needed to justify the cost by smuggling much of the material back to Germany. For example, of the 120 lion friezes along the Procession Street, the Germans took 118. Walter Andrae played a key role in this endeavor using the strong links (or wasta) that he had cultivated with German intelligence officers and with local Iraqi tribal sheikhs. The Gate's ceramic pieces were disassembled according to a complex numbering system and were then packed in straw in coal barrels in order to disguise them. These barrels were then transported down the Euphrates River to Shatt al-Arab, where they were loaded onto German ships and taken to Berlin.

The rebuilding of Babylon's Ishtar Gate and Processional Way in Berlin was one of the most complex architectural reconstructions in the history of archaeology. Hundreds of crates of glazed brick fragments were carefully desalinated and then pieced together. Fragments were combined with new bricks fired in a specially designed kiln to re-create the correct color and finish. It was a double gate; the part that is shown in the Pergamon Museum today is the smaller, frontal part. The larger, back part was considered too large to fit into the constraints of the structure of the museum; it is in storage.

Parts of the gate and animals from the Processional Way are in various other museums around the world. Only four museums acquired dragons, while lions went to several museums. The Istanbul Archaeology Museum has lions, dragons, and bulls. Ny Carlsberg Glyptotek in Copenhagen, Denmark, has one lion, one dragon and one bull. The Detroit Institute of Arts houses a dragon. The Röhsska Museum in Gothenburg, Sweden, has one dragon and one lion; the Louvre, the State Museum of Egyptian Art in Munich, the Kunsthistorisches Museum in Vienna, the Royal Ontario Museum in Toronto, the Metropolitan Museum of Art in New York, the Oriental Institute in Chicago, the Rhode Island School of Design Museum, the Museum of Fine Arts in Boston, and the Yale University Art Gallery in New Haven, Connecticut, each have lions.

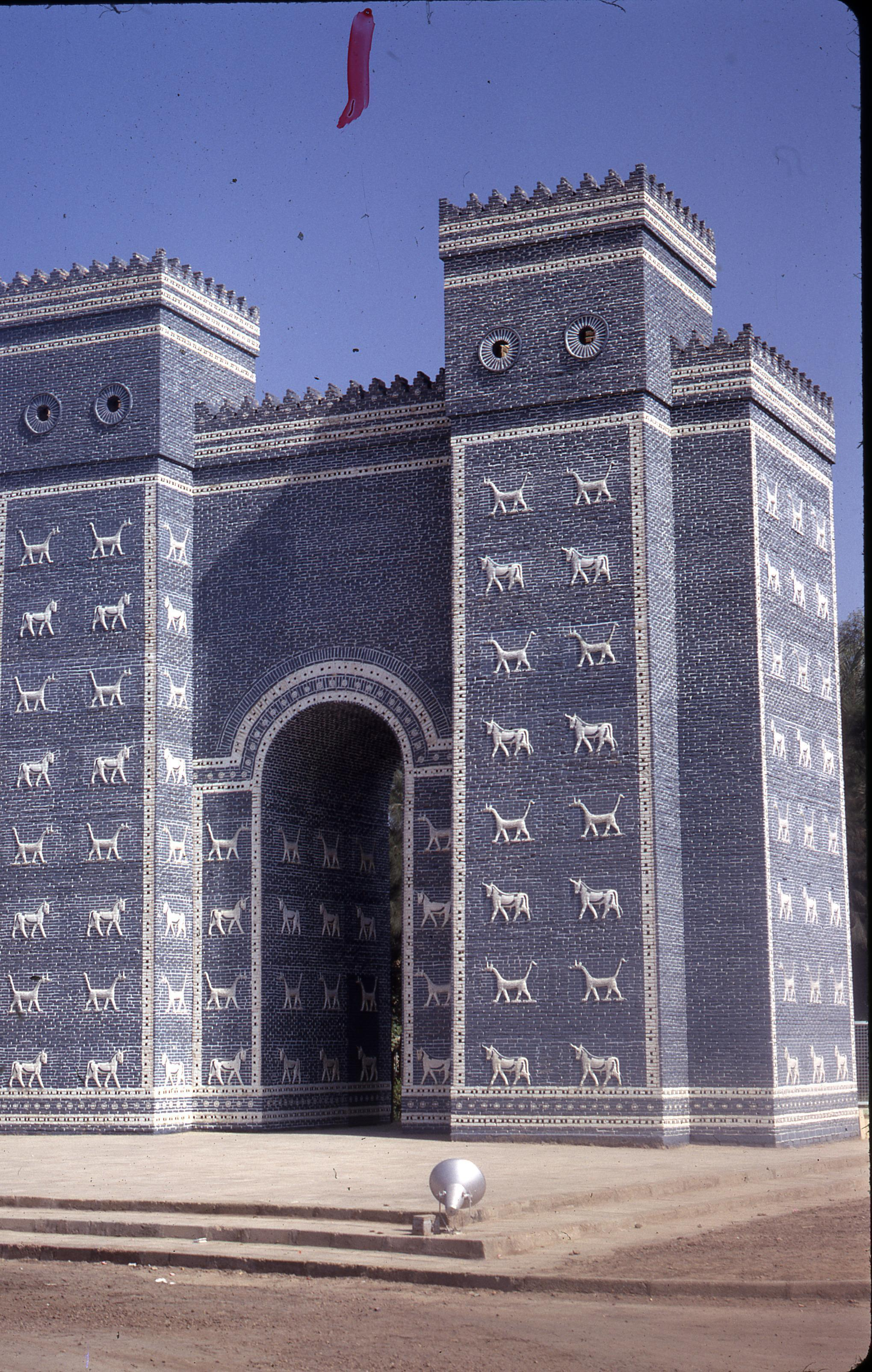
The Ishtar Gate replica, much smaller than the original, in Babylon in 1968

A smaller reproduction of the gate was built in Iraq under Saddam Hussein as the entrance to a museum that has not been completed. Along with the restored palace, the gate was completed in 1987. The construction was meant to emulate the techniques that were used for the original gate. The replica appears similar to the restored original but is notably smaller. The purpose of the replica's construction was an attempt to reconnect to Iraq's history. Damage to this reproduction has occurred since the Iraq War (see Impact of the U.S. military).

== Controversy and attempted repatriation ==
The acquisition of the Ishtar Gate by the Pergamon Museum is surrounded in controversy as the gate was excavated as part of the excavation of Babylon, and immediately shipped off to Berlin where it remains to this day. The government of Iraq has petitioned the German government to return the gate many times, notably in 2002 as well as in 2009. The Ishtar Gate is frequently used as a prime example in the debate regarding repatriating artifacts of cultural significance to countries affected by war and whether these pieces of material culture are better off in a safer environment where they could be preserved. The example in the case of the Ishtar Gate is concerning its safety in the aftermath of the Iraq War, and whether or not the gate would be safer remaining at the Pergamon Museum where it was damaged by bombs in World War II.

== Tol-e Ajori ==
In 2011 a joint Italian-Iranian archeological team discovered the ruins of a monumental gate at the site of Tol-e Ajori, 3 kilometers west of the Achaemenid capital of Persepolis in the region of Fars Province in Iran. The gateway measures 30 by 40 meters and features many similarities to the Ishtar gate in terms of both plan and decoration. While the gate is in much worse condition than the Ishtar Gate, fragments of glazed bricks show identical motifs like the aurochs and the mušḫuššu. The overall design of the gate seems to resemble the inner portion of the Ishtar gate, although scaled up and with some notable changes in design to accommodate the larger size. The gate is dated to the mid-to-late sixth century BCE, and was presumably abandoned after the end of the Achaemenid Period.

== Gallery ==
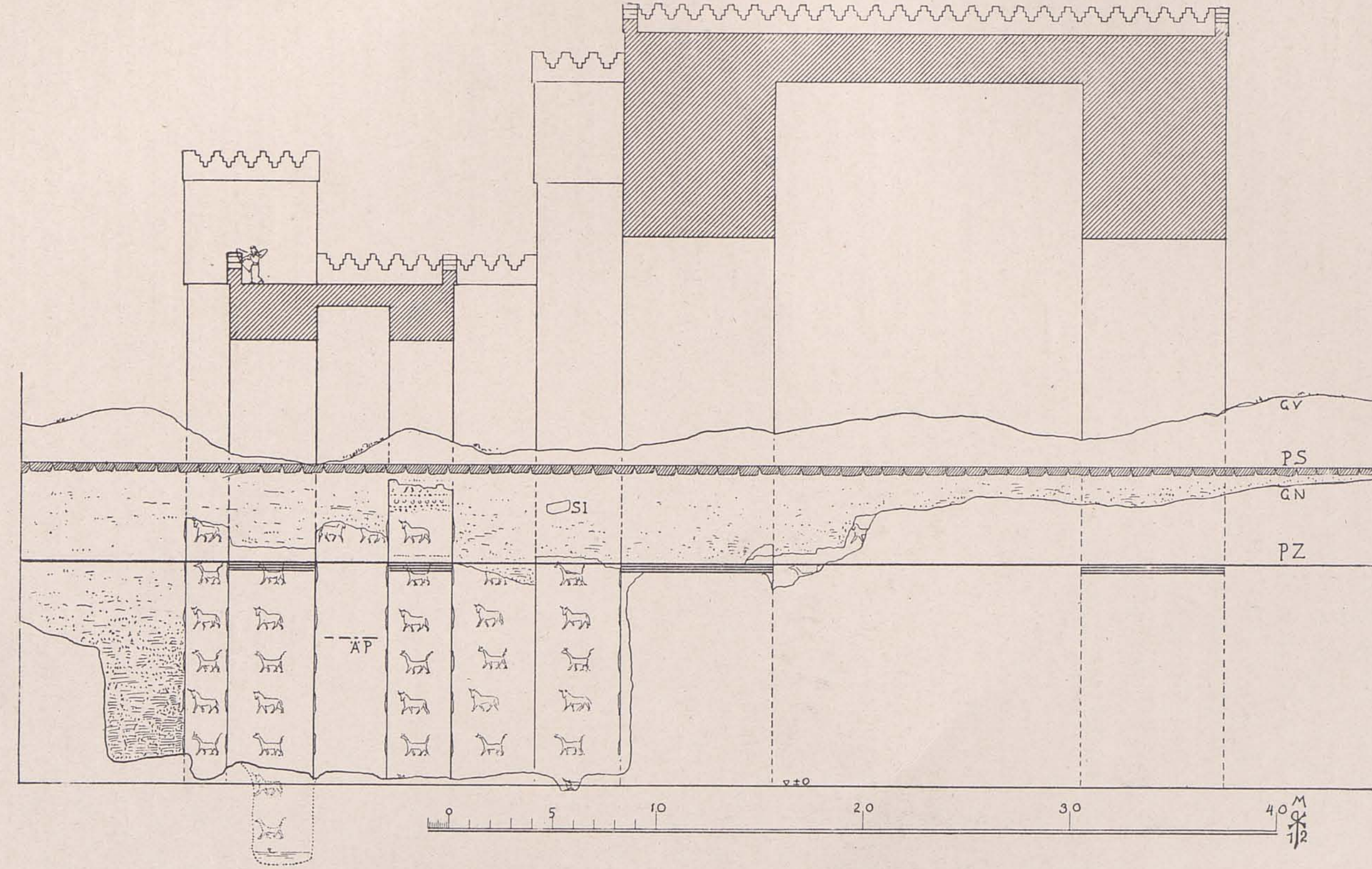
Robert Koldewey's imagining of what a complete and reconstructed Ishtar Gate would look like

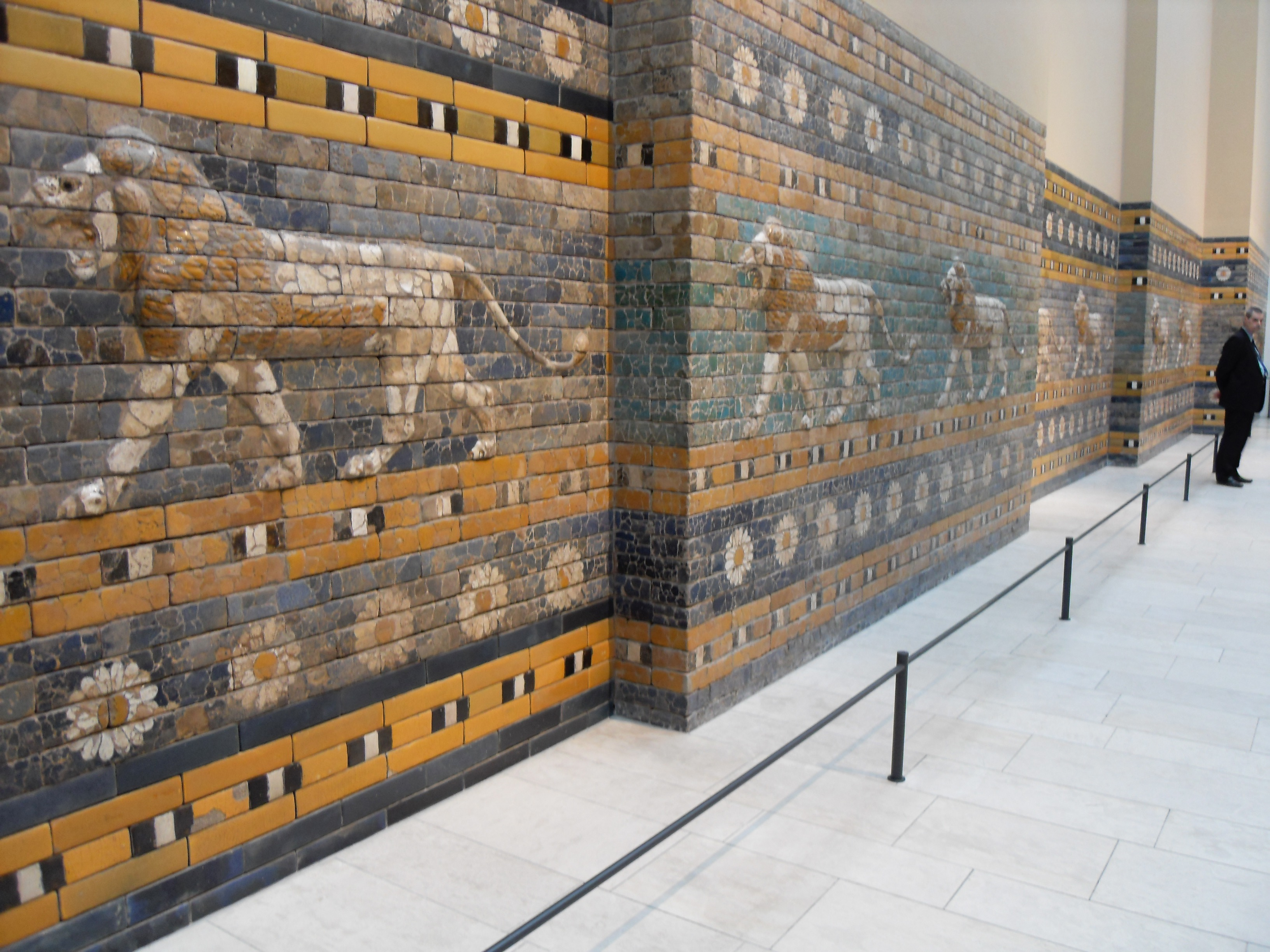
The Processional Way as reconstructed in the Pergamon Museum, Berlin

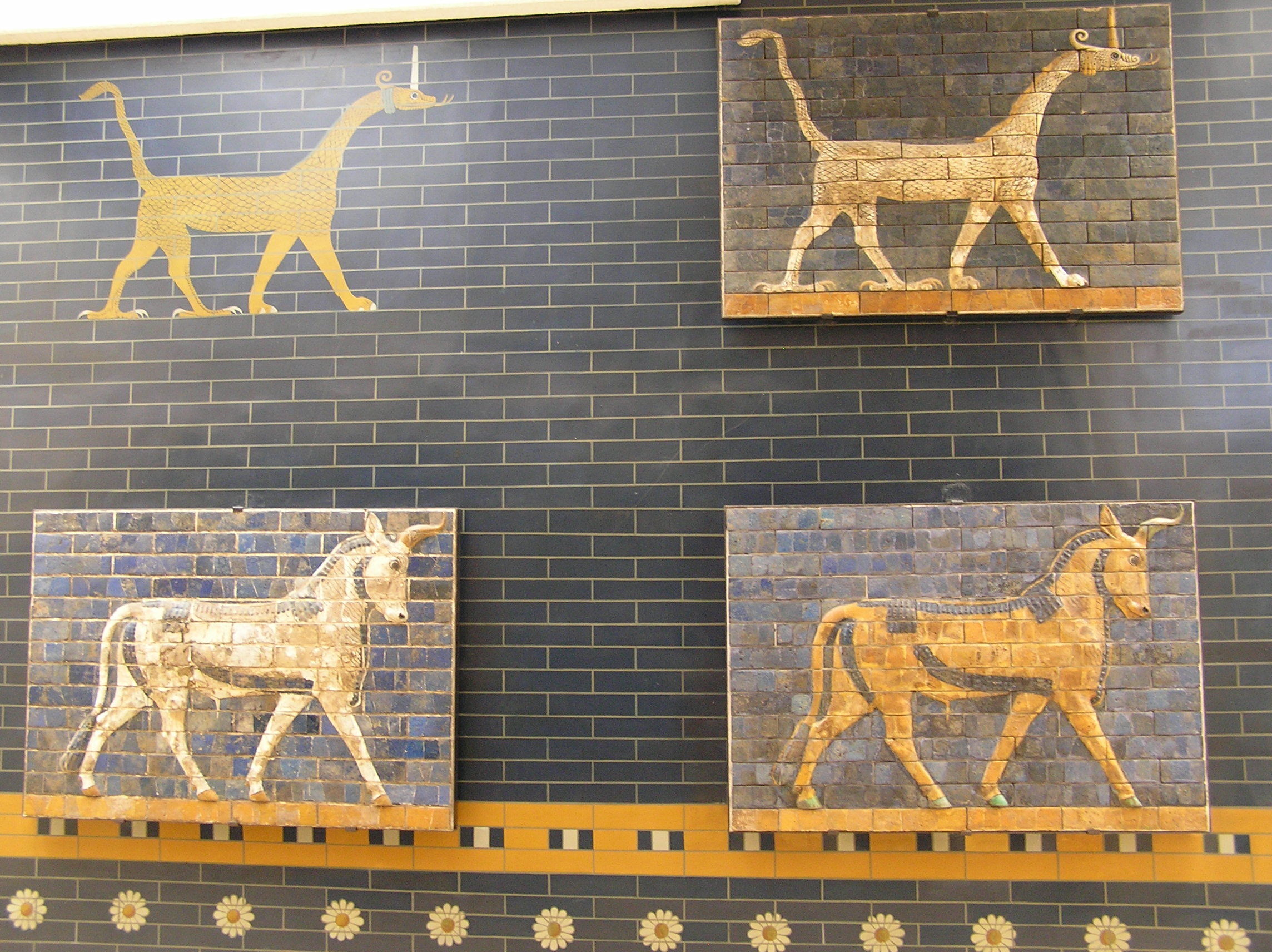
Aurochs and mušḫuššus from the gate in the Istanbul Archaeology Museums

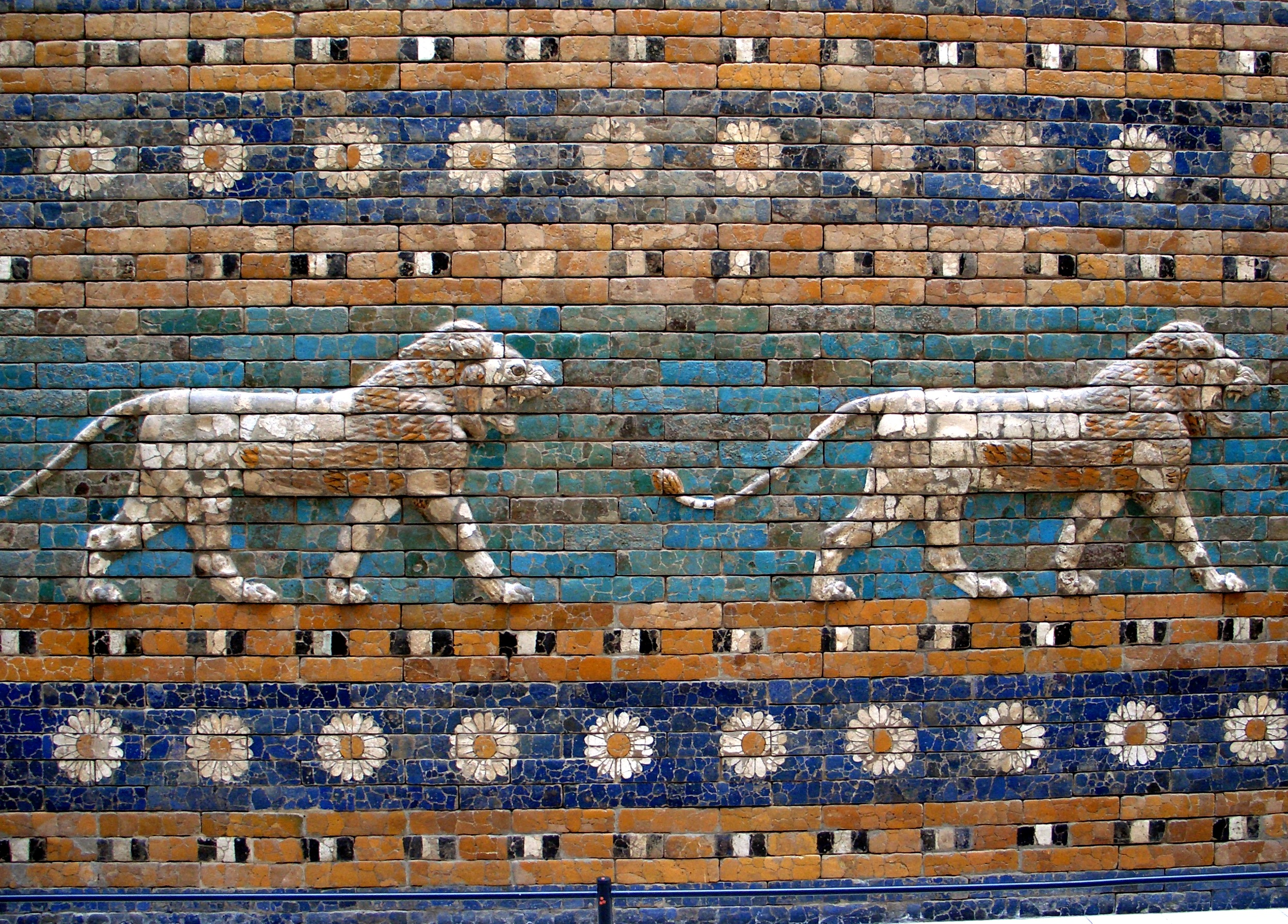
Mesopotamian lions and flowers decorated the processional street.

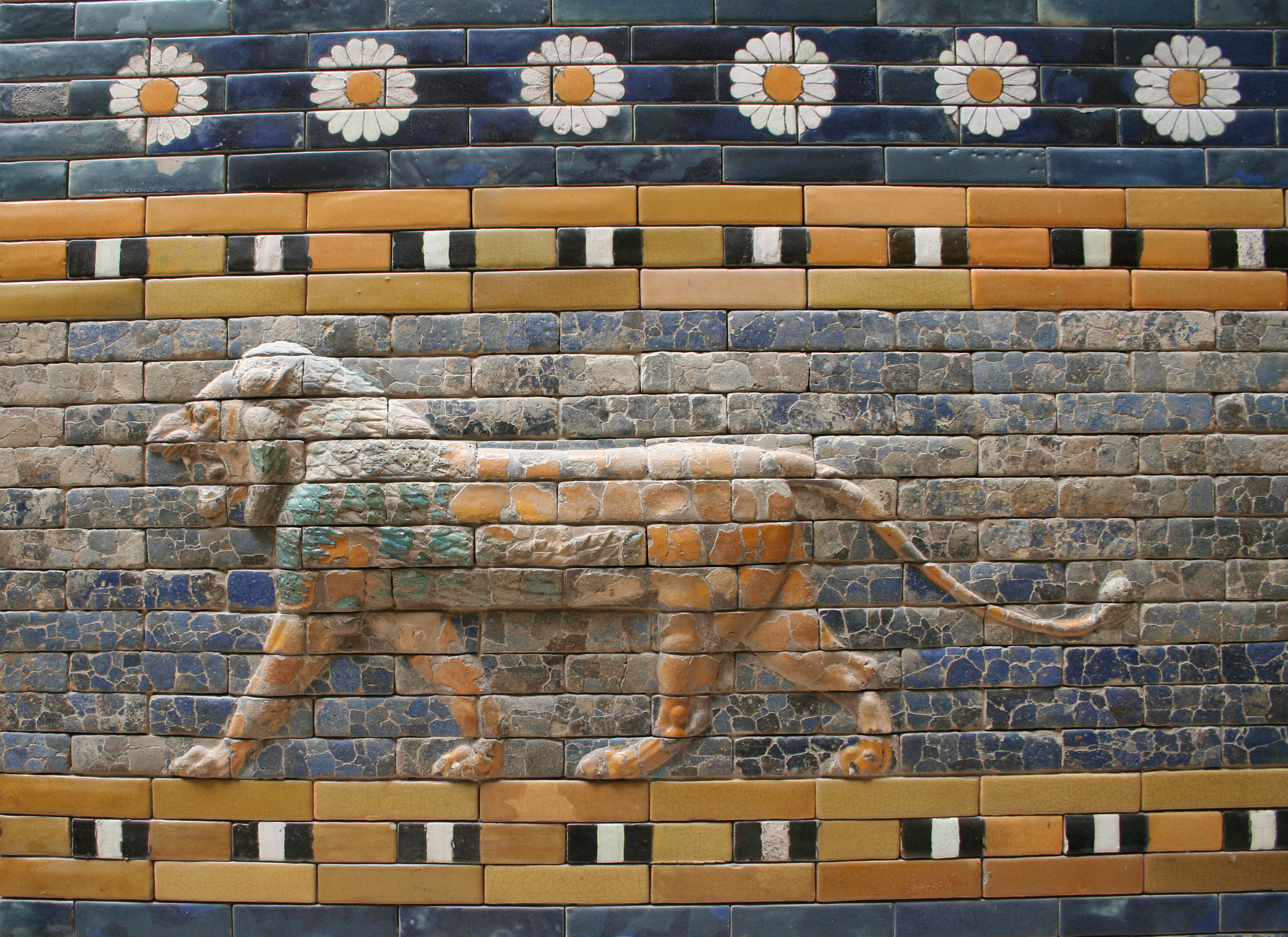
One of the striding lions from the Processional Way

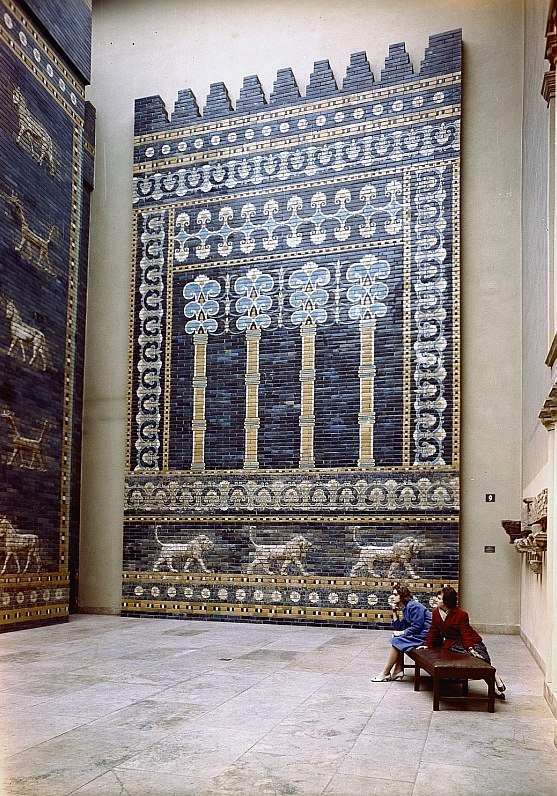
Tiles to the side of the gate

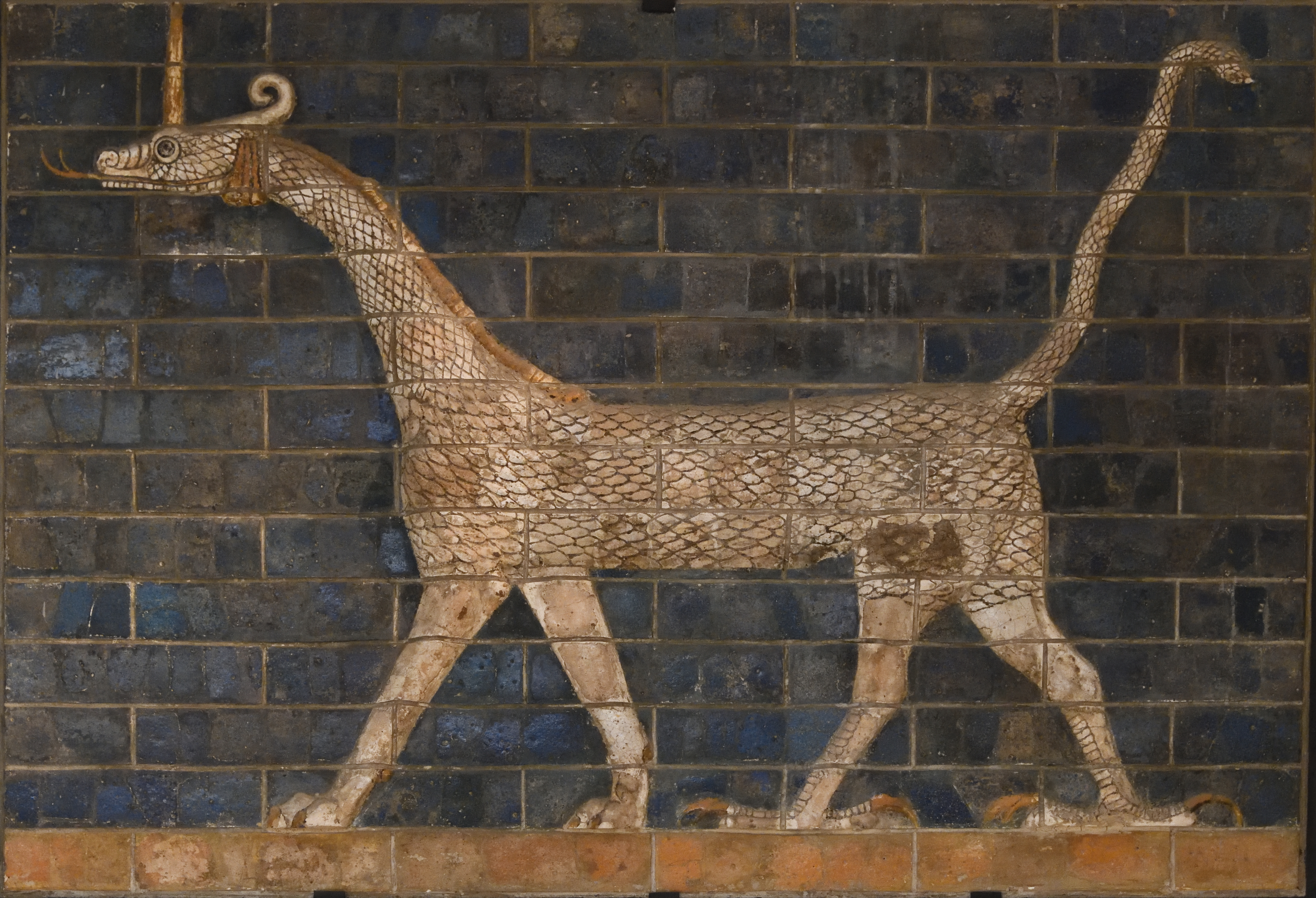
Mušḫuššu dragon in Istanbul, Ancient Orient Museum, Ishtar Gate

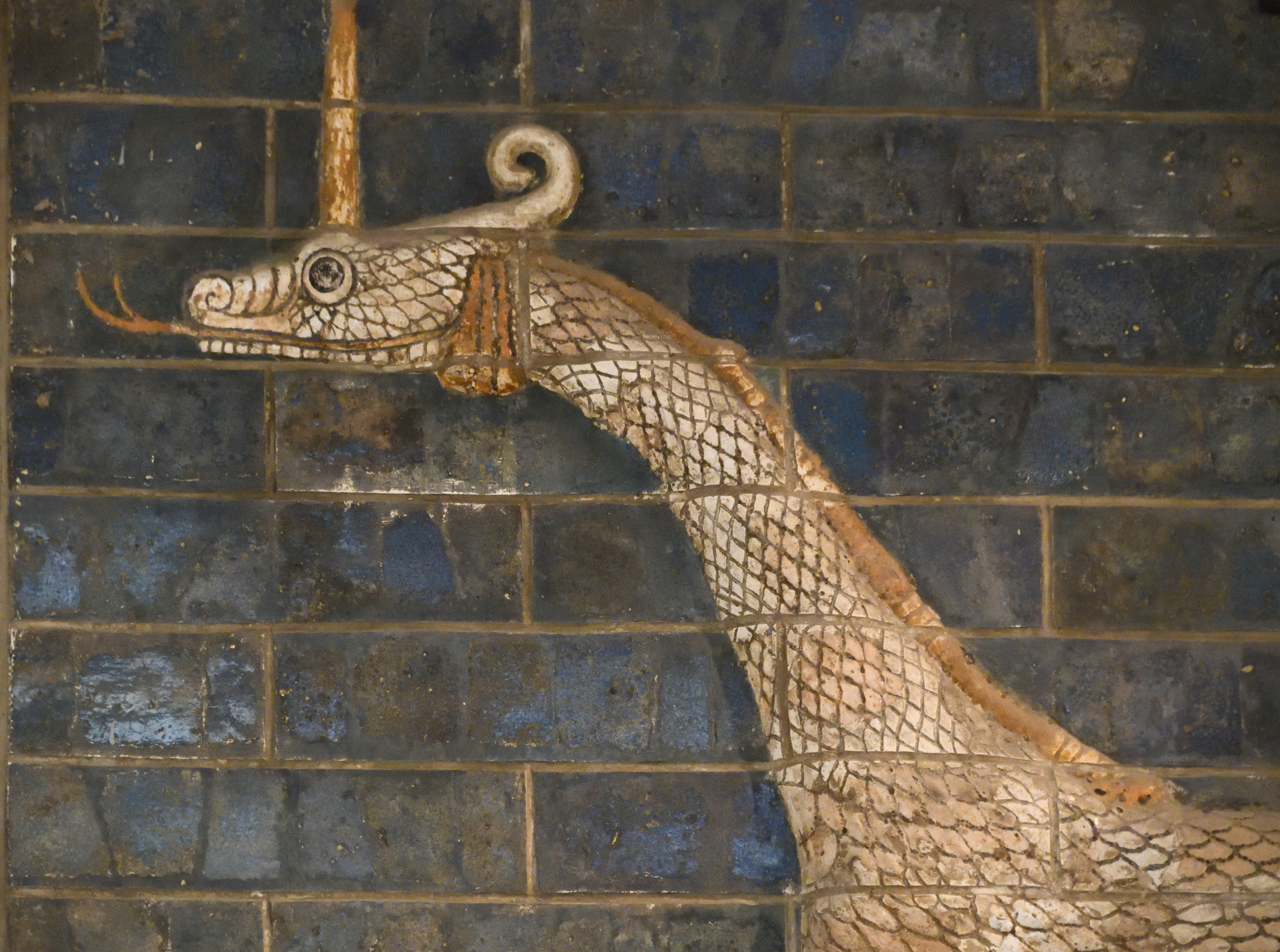
Mušḫuššu dragon in Istanbul, Ancient Orient Museum, Ishtar Gate

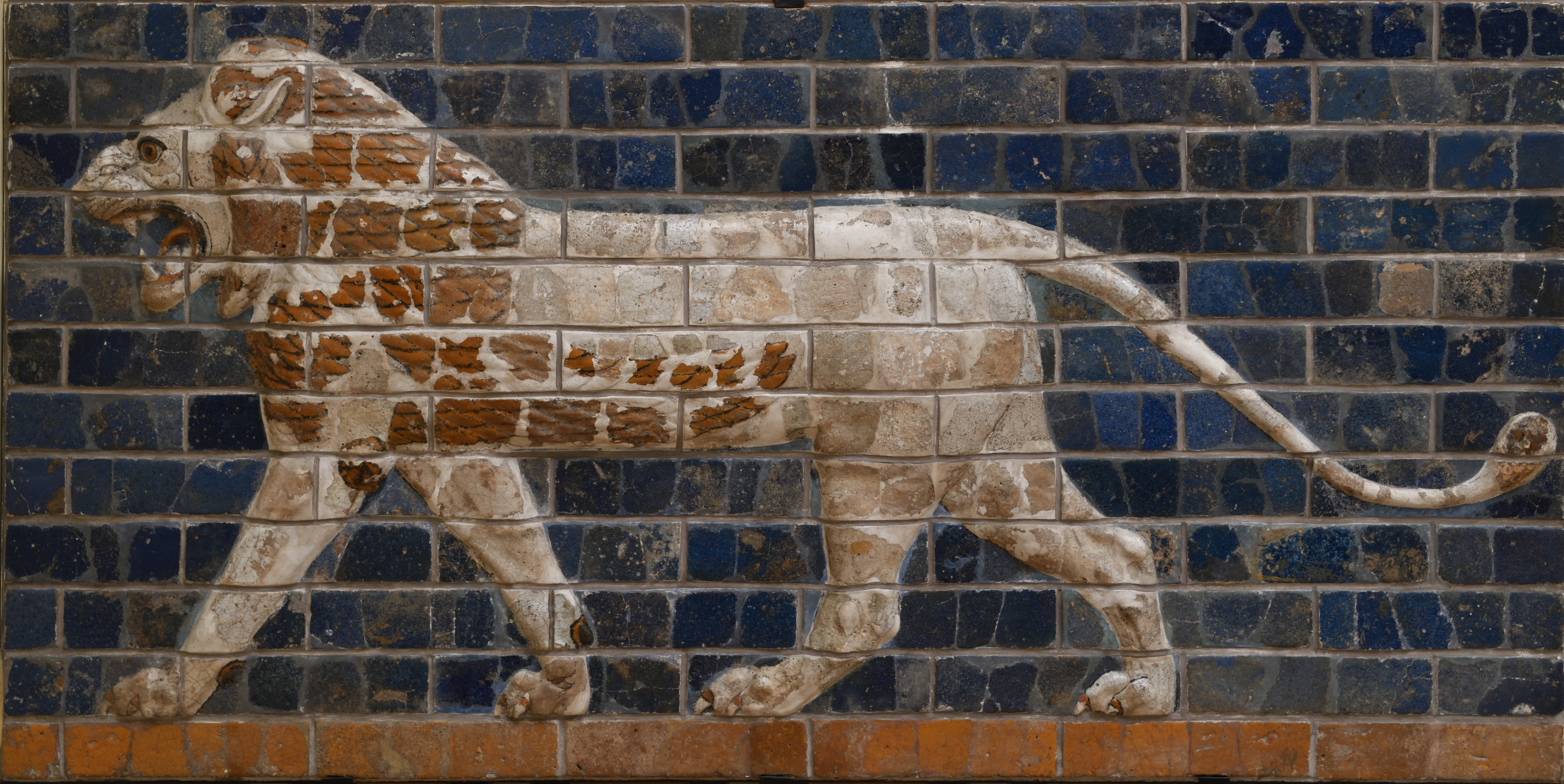
Lion in Istanbul, Ancient Orient Museum, Ishtar Gate

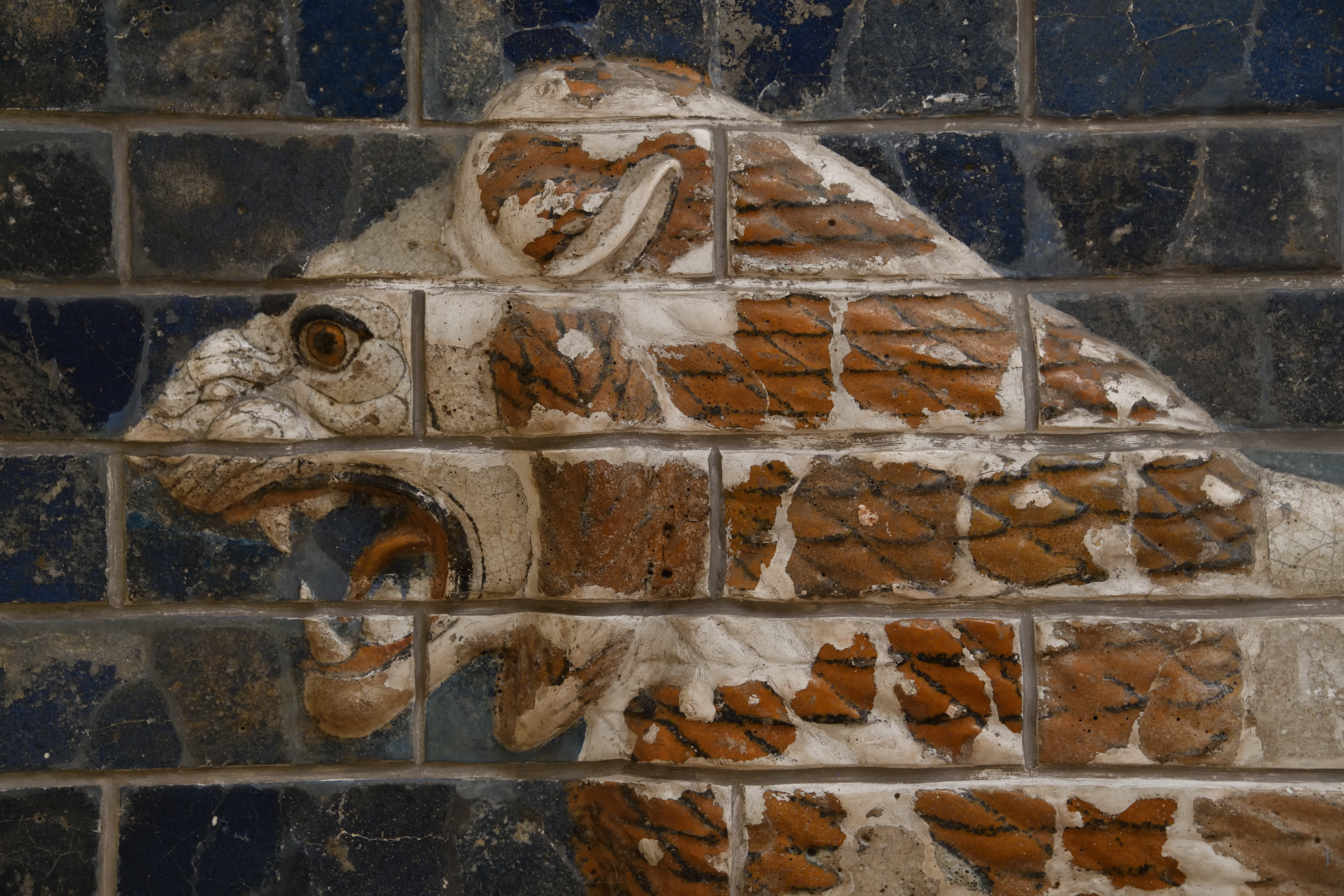
Lion in Istanbul, Ancient Orient Museum, Ishtar Gate

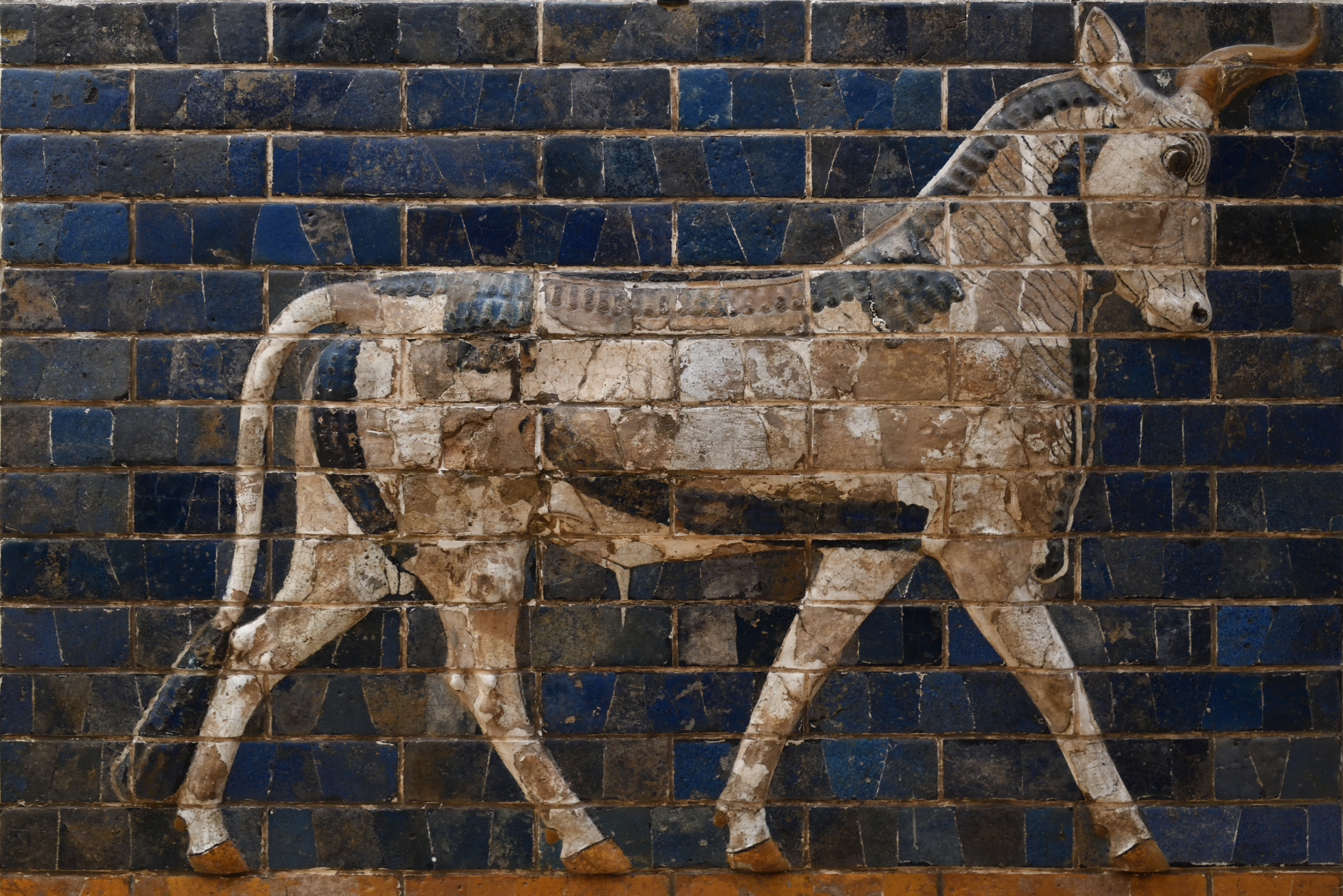
Bull in Istanbul, Ancient Orient Museum, Ishtar Gate

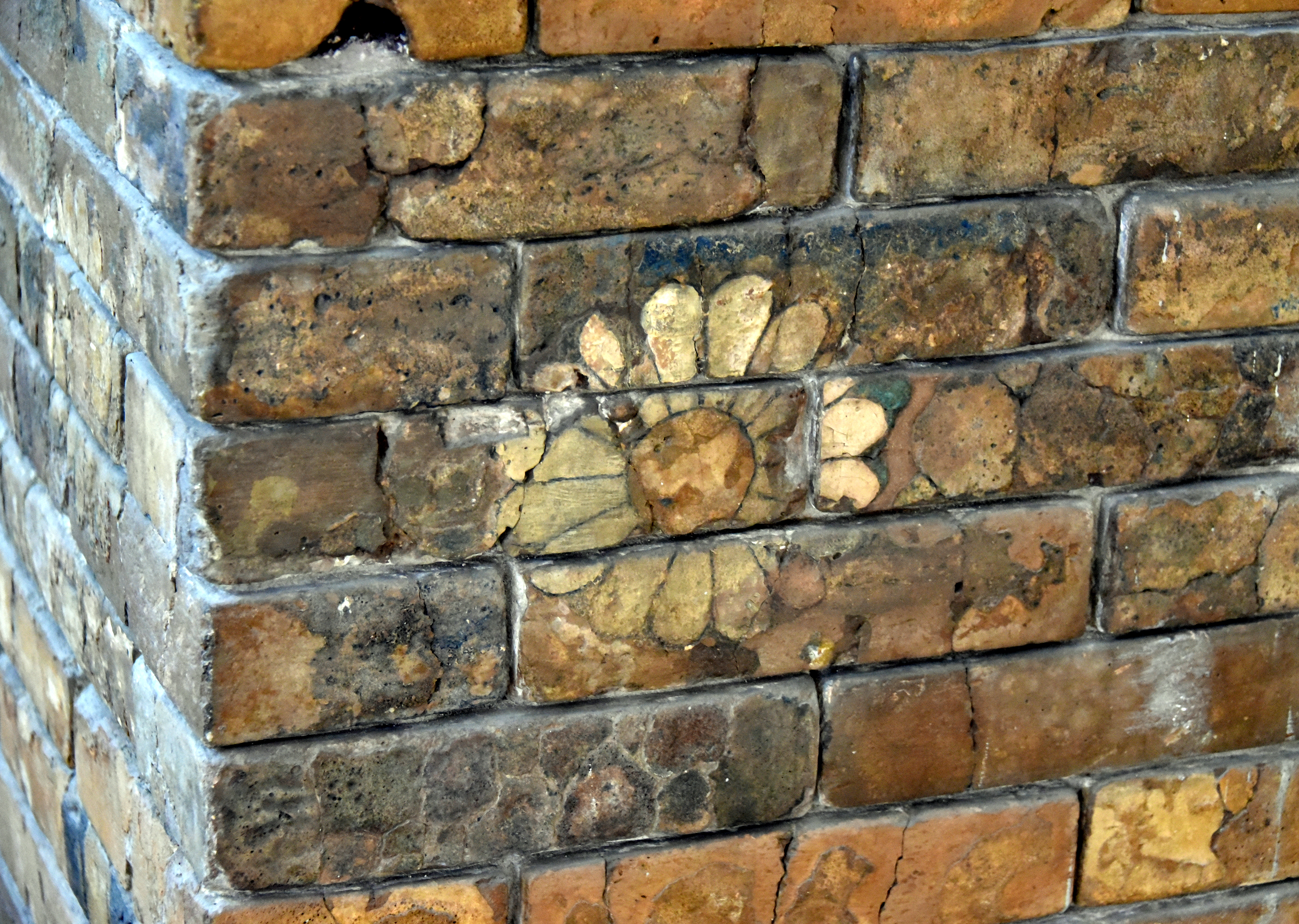
Floral motif from the second construction phase of the Ishtar Gate, Babylon (originally below ground level); glazed bricks from the reign of Nebuchadnezzar II, 6th century BC
